= Lotta flyttar hemifrån =

- Directed by: Johanna Hald
- Written by: Astrid Lindgren (novel); Johanna Hald (screenplay)
- Produced by: Waldemar Bergendahl
- Starring: Grete Havnesköld; Linn Gloppestad; Martin Andersson; Beatrice Järås; Claes Malmberg
- Distributed by: AB Svensk Filmindustri
- Release date: 18 September 1993 (Sweden)
- Running time: 83 minutes
- Country: Sweden
- Language: Swedish

Lotta flyttar hemifrån is a Swedish film which was released to cinemas in Sweden on 18 September 1993, directed by Johanna Hald. It is the second film based on the books about Lotta på Bråkmakargatan written by Astrid Lindgren.

== Cast ==
- Grete Havnesköld as Lotta
- Linn Gloppestad as Mia
- Martin Andersson as Jonas
- Beatrice Järås as Lotta's mother
- Claes Malmberg as Lotta's father
- Margreth Weivers as Mrs. Berg
- Gunvor Pontén as Mrs. Blomgren
- Sten Ljunggren as Mr. Blomgren
- Pierre Lindstedt as Kalle Fransson
- Johan Rabaeus as truck driver
- Renzo Spinetti as Vasilis
