= Bill Bergson and the White Rose Rescue (disambiguation) =

Bill Bergson and the White Rose Rescue is a novel.

Bill Bergson and the White Rose Rescue may also refer to:

- Bill Bergson and the White Rose Rescue (1953 film)
- Bill Bergson and the White Rose Rescue (1997 film)
