= Bill Bergson, Master Detective =

Bill Bergson, Master Detective may refer to:

- Bill Bergson, Master Detective (novel), a children's novel by Astrid Lindgren
- Bill Bergson, Master Detective (film), a 1947 Swedish film
