= Bill Bergson Lives Dangerously (1996 film) =

Kalle Blomkvist – Mästerdetektiven lever farligt
- Directed by: Göran Carmback
- Screenplay by: Johanna Hald
- Based on: Bill Bergson Lives Dangerously by Astrid Lindgren
- Produced by: Waldemar Bergendahl
- Music by: Peter Grönvall
- Release date: 21 December 1996 (Sweden)
- Running time: 85 minutes
- Country: Sweden
- Language: Swedish

Bill Bergson Lives Dangerously (original Swedish title: Kalle Blomkvist – Mästerdetektiven lever farligt) is a 1996 Swedish film directed by Göran Carmback. It is based on the novel with the same name, written by Astrid Lindgren.

The theme music is De hjältemodiga, written by Nanne Grönvall and produced by Peter Grönvall, and sung by Nanne, Maria Rådsten, Fredrik and Christina Ådén.

== About the film ==
An earlier film based on the book was made in 1957. In this second film one thing has been changed – in the book the city is called Lillköping but in this film it is called Storköping, according to the address the murderer wrote on a letter he sent to Eva-Lotta.

The city scenes were recorded in Norrtälje and the countryside scenes were recorded in Västerhaninge.

== Cast ==
- Malte Forsberg as Kalle Blomkvist, "Vita Rosen"
- Josefin Årling as Eva-Lotta Lisander, "Vita Rosen"
- Totte Steneby as Anders, "Vita Rosen"
- Victor Sandberg as Sixten, "Röda Rosen"
- Johan Stattin as Jonte, "Röda Rosen"
- Bobo Steneby as Benke, "Röda Rosen"
- Claes Malmberg as Björk, policeman
- Peter Andersson as commissioner Strand
- Lakke Magnusson as Gren
- Krister Henriksson as Gren's murderer
- Leif Andrée as the baker, Eva-Lotta's father
- Catherine Hansson as Eva-Lotta's mother
- Ulla Skoog as Ada, Sixten's aunt
- Erika Höghede as Sixten's mother
- Toni Wilkens as Sixten's father
- Jacob Nordenson as the doctor, Benke's father
- Gerd Hegnell as Mrs. Karlsson
- Per Morberg as the contributing editor of newspaper
- David Olsson as Fredrik
