= Junibacken =

Tourist attraction in Stockholm, Sweden

Coordinates: 59°19′46″N 18°05′20″E

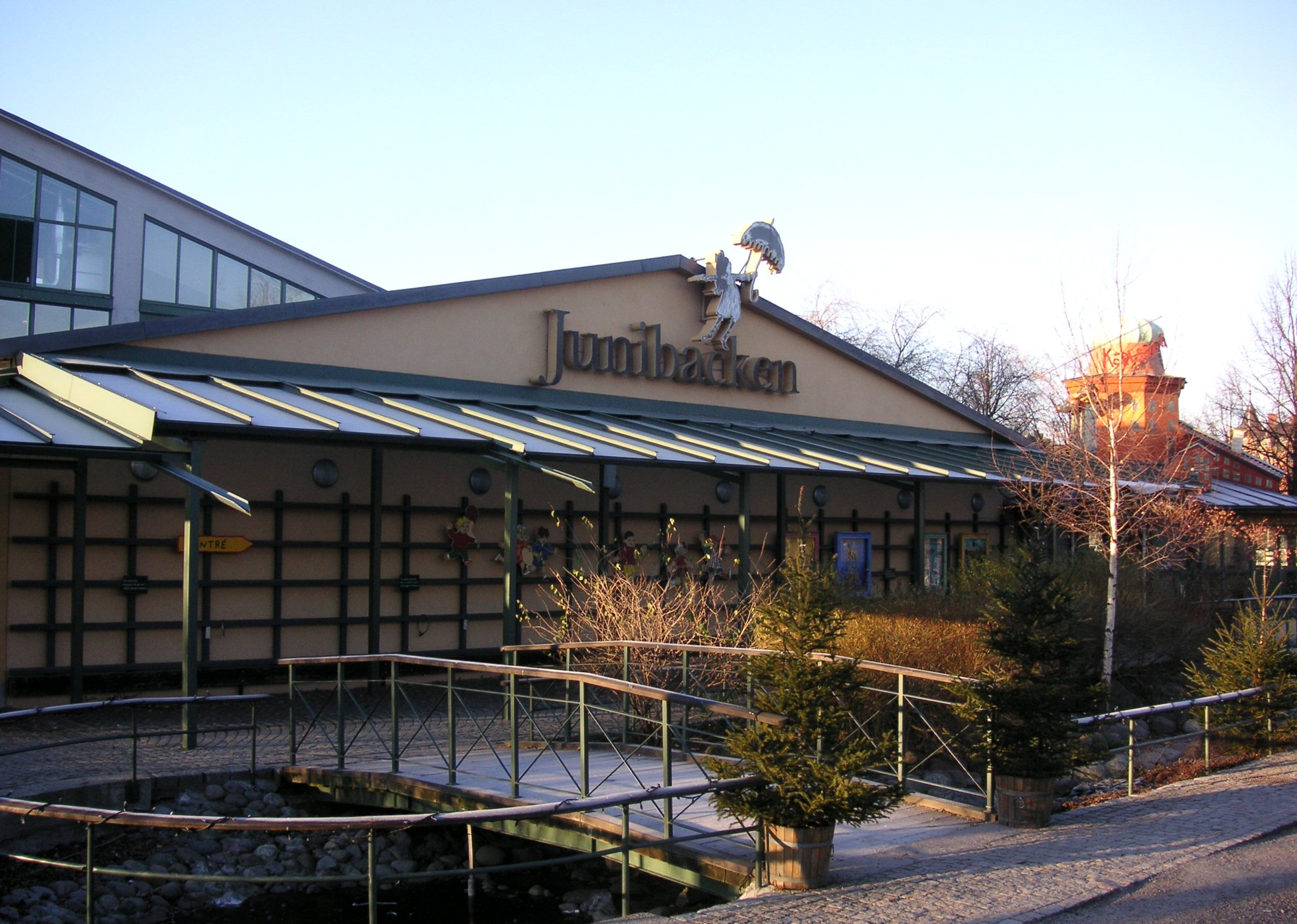
Entrance to the Junibacken children's attraction, Stockholm

Junibacken is a children’s attraction, founded by Staffan Götestam, Fredrik Uhrström and Peder Wallenberg. It is situated on the island of Djurgården in Stockholm, Sweden.

It was officially opened by the Swedish royal family on 8 June 1996. It is Stockholm’s 5th most-visited tourist attraction. It is devoted to Swedish children’s literature, but especially Astrid Lindgren. Outside the building is a bronze statue of Lindgren. The art direction and images for the interior design were made by Swedish artist Marit Törnqvist, who had previously made illustrations for more recent versions of Lindgren's books.

Junibacken contains the largest children’s bookstore in Sweden. The lockers in the entrance hall are unusual in that each is in the form of a giant book-spine, featuring world classics such as Treasure Island and The Jungle Book. Other main attractions include a Storybook Square, a mock public square where each house is devoted to a separate Swedish children’s author (other than Lindgren), from the earliest writers such as Elsa Beskow to recent writers such as Sven Nordqvist. The square ends at a mock Vimmerby railway station. The station also presents framed copies of Lindgren memorabilia, including a glowing letter of praise for Lindgren from then president of the Soviet Union Mikhail Gorbachev. From the station visitors then take a theme-train ride through the world of Astrid Lindgren’s books, with one “stage setting” for each of her well-known works, such as Madicken, Karlsson-on-the-Roof, Ronia the Robber's Daughter, Emil i Lönneberga, and The Brothers Lionheart. The train ride ends at a half-side reconstruction of Villa Villekulla, the home of Lindgren's most well-known character, Pippi Longstocking.

Junibacken includes a theatre, restaurant and temporary exhibition space. The temporary exhibition space is usually devoted to a single author or character and normally remains in place for 11 months. Among the most popular of the temporary exhibitions have been Pettson and Findus, and Trazan och Banarne.

Junibacken is not a museum according to ICOM's definition because it has no collections. It is, however, a member of both Swedish ICOM and Riksförbundet Sveriges museer.

== Changes ==
In 2006, the dragon scene in the Story Train was modified to become less scary. Originally, the dragon scene featured the guests passing in front of Katla, seeing her from very close. It was changed because it scared many children who rode the Story Train. It broke down the same year it was changed. In the new dragon scene, the guests see Katla at a distance, from Skorpan's and Jonathan's point of view. Another difference is that the old dragon moved a little, roaring as the guests saw her. It was made of Latex. The new dragon does not move and is made of metal.
