= Waldemar Bergendahl =

Swedish screenwriter and film producer (1933–2022)

- Born: 18 April 1933; Årsunda, Sweden
- Died: 21 March 2022 (aged 88)
- Occupations: Film director, editor, producer, screenwriter
- Years active: 1957–2010

Waldemar Bergendahl (18 April 1933 – 21 March 2022) was a Swedish film director, film editor, film producer, cinematographer and screenwriter. Bergendahl is best known as the producer behind the films based on novels by Astrid Lindgren.

== Life and career ==
Bergendahl was born in April 1933 in Årsunda. He grew up on a farm between Årsunda and Gästrike-Hammarby. His parents were farmers with cows, horses, chickens, pigs and many other animals. Bergendahl later went to University in Gävle. Then he moved to Stockholm.

In 1957 Bergendahl lived along with the production manager of Europafilm in an apartment in Stockholm. The production manager told Bergendahl to apply for a job at the film company. One year later, Bergendahl was part of the film crew of Miss April, a film with Gunnar Björnstrand and Gaby Stenberg in the leading roles. At that time he did know anything about film work, so he tried to help wherever he could.

Bergendahl dreamed of becoming an actor, but realized soon that he was not suitable for the job. However, he wanted to continue working in the film industry and therefore decided to work as a producer.

In 1963 Bergendahl produced the film Raven's End. In 1984 he started working with Astrid Lindgren and produced Ronia, the Robber's Daughter. His film My Life as a Dog (1988) was nominated as the best non English film for the British Academy Film Awards.

Bergendahl produced around 120 films. He worked along with Astrid Lindgren, Tage Danielsson, Bo Widerberg, Lasse Hallström, Helena Bergström and many others. He always selected the employees for his films himself.

In 2010 Bergendahl was honored as a film producer by winning the Hedersguldbaggen.

== Private life ==
Bergendahl lived until his death in Stockholm. He has two younger sisters. In 2008 Bergendahl was diagnosed with Parkinson's.

== Selected filmography ==
Film
Year	Title	Notes
1961	Lovely Is the Summer Night	
1963	Raven's End	
1967	Elvira Madigan	
1967	Joe Hill	
1984	Ronia, the Robber's Daughter	
1985	False as Water	
1985	My Life as a Dog	
1986	Jönssonligan dyker upp igen	
1986	The Children of Noisy Village	
1987	Jim & Piraterna Blom	
1987	Leif	
1987	More About the Children of Noisy Village	
1988	Strul	
1988	Go'natt Herr Luffare	short film
1988	Allrakäraste syster	short film
1988	Gull-Pian	short film
1988	Ingen rövare finns i skogen	short film
1989	Brenda Brave	short film
1989	Hoppa högst	short film
1989	Hajen som visste för mycket	
1989	The Women on the Roof	
1989	Jönssonligan på Mallorca	
1989	1939	
1989	Peter och Petra	
1990	Blackjack	
1990	Nils Karlsson Pyssling	
1990	Pelle flyttar till Komfusenbo	
1991	Agnes Cecilia – en sällsam historia	
1992	Lotta på Bråkmakargatan	
1992	Svart Lucia	
1993	Sökarna	
1993	Lotta flyttar hemifrån	
1993	The Slingshot	
1993	Family Matters	
1993	Sune's Summer	
1996	Hamsun	
1996	Bill Bergson Lives Dangerously	
1997	Adam & Eva	
1997	Pippi Longstocking	
1997	Bill Bergson and the White Rose Rescue	
1999	Adult Behavior	
2002	Karlsson på taket	
2004	Håkan Bråkan & Josef	
2007	Mind the Gap	
2007	Arn – The Knight Templar	
2008	Arn – The Kingdom at Road's End	

Television
Year	Title	Notes
1988	Mimmi	TV series, 4 episodes
1997	Pippi Longstocking	TV series, 1 episode
1999–2000	Eva & Adam	TV series, 16 episodes
2002	Karlsson on the Roof	TV series

== Awards and nominations ==
BAFTA Awards

- 1988: Best Foreign Language Film: My Life as a Dog (Nomination)

Guldbagge

- 1986: Best Film (Bästa film): My Life as a Dog (Award)
- 1992: Best Film (Bästa film): Agnes Cecilia – en sällsam historia (shared with Ingrid Dalunde, Nomination)
- 1994: Best Film (Bästa film): The Slingshot (Nomination)
- 1996: Best Film (Bästa film): En på miljonen (Nomination)
- 1998: Best Film (Bästa film): Adam & Eva (Nomination)
- 2010: Hedersguldbaggen as film producer (Award)
