= Staffan Götestam =

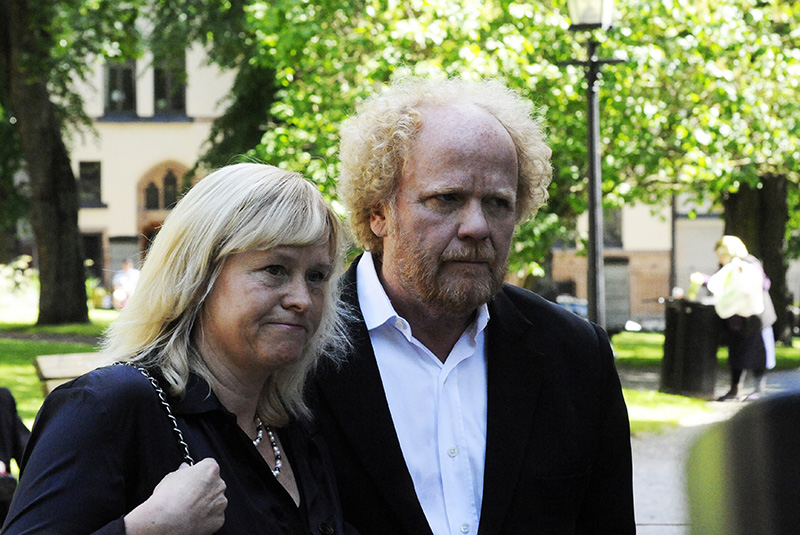
- Staffan Götestam
- Born: 20 May 1952 (age 74); Örnsköldsvik, Sweden
- Occupations: actor, director, playwright

Per Staffan Götestam (born 20 May 1952) is a Swedish actor, director, theatre chief, playwright and founder of Junibacken. As an actor, he is best known for his portrayal of Jonathan in 1977 The Brothers Lionheart. In the 1980s, he turned his focus to producing and directing. He has directed many plays, among them Nils Karlsson Pyssling, Madicken and Tjorven på Saltkråkan, and many musicals, among them Rent, Beauty and the Beast and the Wizard of Oz. In 2000, Götestam received a Swedish Golden Mask theatre award. Götestam also wrote the song "Mio My Mio" for the 1987 film Mio in the Land of Faraway.

== Early life ==
Staffan Götestam was born in Örnsköldsvik, Sweden on 20 May 1952. He was educated at Skara skolscen and Statens scenskola, Stockholm. He went to theater school in 1973 and started playing amateur theatre with the Örebro Student Theatre.

== Career ==
=== Acting ===
After his theater training, Götestam got a role in the musical Godspell (1974), which was performed in the Jarlateatern in Stockholm.

In 1977, he became known for his portrayal of Jonathan in the film The Brothers Lionheart. While working on this film, Götestam met Astrid Lindgren, with whom he would collaborate often in the future.

In the late 1970s, Götestam began working, mainly behind the scenes, as a director, screenwriter or producer.

=== Directing ===
In the beginning of the 1980s, he started working with Olle Kinch, the theatre chief of Folkan. It was around this time, that he turned full time to producing and directing. He directed many plays, among them Nils Karlsson Pyssling, Madicken and Tjorven på Saltkråkan, and many musicals, among them Rent, Beauty and the Beast and the Wizard of Oz.

Götestam also wrote the music of the song "Mio My Mio" for the 1987 film Mio in the Land of Faraway.

In 2000, Götestam received a Guldmasken (Golden mask), a top Swedish theatre award.

Along with his daughter Josefine Götestam, he produced radio plays on well-known children's fairy tales such as Cinderella and The Little Mermaid. In 2019, Götestam directed the play Happy Ending, for which he also wrote the screenplay. He and his daughter also collaborate with the fctiinal character Humlan Djojj.

== Collaboration with Astrid Lindgren ==
Götestam met Astrid Lindgren while working on the 1977 film The Brothers Lionheart which led to a number of future collaborations. For example, he adapted some of her works into theater plays and directed them. He also directed Astrid Lindgren's short films Gull-Pian and Nils Karlsson Pyssling.

In 1996, Götestam founded the Swedish museum Junibacken. The museum is dedicated to Astrid Lindgren's children's literature. The museum also deals with other famous figures such as Pettson and Findus. Götestam was still working at the museum in 2020.

== Personal life ==
Götestam is married and has four children. He lives at Östermalm. He and his daughter, Josefine Götestam, have worked together on radio plays for children. Götestam's sister is Birgitta Götestam.

== Discography ==
=== Albums ===
- 1975 - Trollgas Adventskalender

== Selected filmography ==
- 1990 - Nils Karlsson Pyssling (screenwriter, music writer and director)
- 1989 - Gull-Pian (director)
- 1986 - Bödeln och skökan
- 1977 - 91:an och generalernas fnatt
- 1977 - The Brothers Lionheart
