= Bill Bergson Lives Dangerously (1957 film) =

1957 film

Mästerdetektiven Blomkvist lever farligt
- Directed by: Olle Hellbom
- Screenplay by: Astrid Lindgren
- Based on: Bill Bergson Lives Dangerously by Astrid Lindgren
- Produced by: Olle Nordemar
- Music by: Charles Redland
- Release date: 7 December 1957 (Sweden)
- Running time: 92 minutes
- Country: Sweden
- Language: Swedish

Bill Bergson Lives Dangerously (original Swedish name: Mästerdetektiven Blomkvist lever farligt) is a 1957 Swedish film about Bill Bergson (in Swedish as Kalle Blomkvist), directed by Olle Hellbom. It is based on the novel with the same name, written by Astrid Lindgren, and was recorded in Trosa, Södermanland.

There are differences between the book and this film:

- The murderer wears checkered trousers instead of green gabardine trousers.
- The mansion house has been changed to a "ghost castle".
- In the novel, the murderer tries to escape with his car, but in the film he instead escapes with a boat but can't because Kalle, who is also on the boat, takes the revolver from him and shoots holes in the boat.

== Cast ==
- Leif Nilsson as Kalle Blomkvist
- Sven Almgren as Anders Bengtsson
- Birgitta Hörnblad as Eva-Lotta Lisander
- Sigge Fürst as Björk
- Nils Hallberg as Loan Shark Customer
- Siv Ericks as Mrs. Lisander
- Erik Strandmark as Mr. Lisander
- Georg Skarstedt as Karl August Gren
- John Norrman as Fredriksson
- Ragnar Arvedson as Georg Berg
- Hjördis Petterson as Mrs. Karlsson
- Carl-Axel Elfving as Journalist
- Birger Lensander as Sixten's Father
- Richard Paulson as Sixten
- Lasse Starck as Benka
- Sven Thunborg as Jonte
- Bengt Blomgren as Forsberg
- Eivor Landström as Sixten's Mother

== See also ==
- Bill Bergson Lives Dangerously (1996 film)
