= Pettson & Findus: Fun Stuff =

2014 film by Ali Samadi Ahadi

- Film poster
- Directed by: Ali Samadi Ahadi
- Release date: August 1, 2014
- Countries: Germany; Sweden
- Languages: German; Swedish

Pettson & Findus: Fun Stuff (Swedish: Pettson och Findus - Roligheter, German: Pettersson und Findus – Kleiner Quälgeist, große Freundschaft) is a 2014 live-action/animated film about the characters, Pettson and Findus created by Sven Nordqvist. The film was released theatrically in Sweden on August 1, 2014.

== Plot ==
Shortly before Christmas, Pettson and the tomcat Findus are snowed in on their farm, without presents or a tree. When Pettson also injures himself, Findus has to make the Christmas preparations on his own and struggles to enjoy the festivities.

== Cast ==
- Ulrich Noethen as Pettson
- Marianne Sägebrecht as Beda
- Max Herbrechter as Gustavsson

=== Swedish voices ===
- Claes Månsson as Berättare
- Ima Nilsson as Findus (Katten)
- Claes Månsson as Pettson (Gubben)
- Allan Svensson as Gustavsson
- Ewa Roos as Beda
- Annika Rynger as Hönan
- Vicki Benckert as Övriga Röster
- Annika Herlitz as Övriga Röster
- Anders Öjebo as Övriga Röster
- Anna Sahlin as Övriga Röster

== Sequel ==
- Pettson & Findus: The Best Christmas Ever (2016)
