= Pettson och Findus – Kattonauten =

Pettson och Findus - Kattonauten
- Directed by: Torbjörn Jansson; Albert Hanan Kaminski; Árpad Szabó
- Written by: Torbjörn Jansson
- Produced by: Ulf Synnerholm
- Starring: Roy Bjørnstad; Morten Haugersveen; Bjørn Jenseg; Anne Marit Jacobsen; Sigrid Huun; Bernhard Ramstad
- Music by: Komeda
- Production company: Happy Life Animation AB
- Distributed by: AB Svensk Filmindustri
- Release date: 27 October 2000
- Running time: 76 minutes
- Country: Sweden
- Language: Swedish

Pettson och Findus – Kattonauten is a Swedish children's film from 2000, based on the books Pettson and Findus by Sven Nordqvist.

== Plot ==
The cat Findus decides he wants to write a letter to the King, in an attempt to convince Pettson, that kittens don't have to clean up. While Findus waits for a response, he and the old man are visited by tigers, moose and an occasional forgotten relative.
