= Ronia, the Robber's Daughter (film) =

- German film poster
- Directed by: Tage Danielsson
- Written by: Astrid Lindgren
- Based on: Ronja, the Robber's Daughter by Astrid Lindgren
- Produced by: Waldemar Bergendahl
- Starring: Hanna Zetterberg; Dan Håfström; Börje Ahlstedt; Lena Nyman
- Cinematography: Rune Ericson; Mischa Gavrjusjov; Ole Fredrik Haug
- Edited by: Jan Persson
- Music by: Björn Isfält
- Production companies: FilmTeknik; Norsk Film; Svenska Ord; Sveriges Television; Svensk Filmindustri
- Distributed by: Svensk Filmindustri
- Release date: 14 December 1984 (Sweden)
- Running time: 126 minutes
- Country: Sweden
- Language: Swedish
- Budget: SEK 18 million (US$ 2.18 million) (estimated)
- Box office: SEK 49,396,838 (Sweden)

Ronia, the Robber's Daughter (in the UK, Ronja Rövardotter in Sweden, Ronja Robbersdaughter in the USA) is a Swedish fantasy film which was released to cinemas in Sweden on 14 December 1984, directed by Tage Danielsson, based on the 1981 novel of the same title by Astrid Lindgren, and adapted for the screen by Lindgren herself.

When the film was broadcast on television two years after its cinema premiere, the film was twenty minutes longer and uncensored (the cinema release allowed viewing from 7 years and older). This spurred a debate where critics asked if films were more harmful in cinemas than on television. The film was selected as the Swedish entry for the Best Foreign Language Film at the 58th Academy Awards, but was not accepted as a nominee.

== Plot ==
Ronia, daughter of robber-chief Mattis, becomes friends with Birk Borkasson. His father, robber-chief Borka, is the main rival and fiercest enemy of Ronia's father.

The film opens at the castle of Mattis (Börje Ahlstedt, Ronia's father) and Lovis (Lena Nyman, Ronia's mother). A thunderstorm rages about the castle as Lovis is giving birth to Ronia (Hanna Zetterberg). Minutes after the baby is born lightning strikes the castle and splits away a part of the castle, creating a deep rift in the rock below. Ten years later Ronia is old enough to explore the wilderness and learn how to deal with the dangers out there. Mattis is the head of a band of good-natured robbers, and he warns his daughter of the dangers that she is likely to meet in the wilderness. Nonetheless, Ronia sets out on the adventure and encounters the various creatures and dangers as already told by her father.

Meanwhile another group of robbers, led by their chief Borka have settled in the now separated part of the castle, much to the dismay of Mattis. He is even more angered by his rival Borka roaming around the forests which Mattis claims as his own territory and even robbing away Mattis' loot in one instance. Consequently, Mattis hatches a plan to drive Borka's people away from the woodland.

Borka has a son, Birk (Dan Håfström) who happens to have been born the very same thundery night that Ronia was born. There is some initial enmity between Birk and Ronia when they meet first, but after saving Ronia, who got her foot stuck in a hole in the ground, the two eventually become friends and share some adventures together. Their friendship must be kept secret as their parents would never allow a connection to the rival clan. Though separated by the constant hatred between their parents, the two reunite a couple of times.

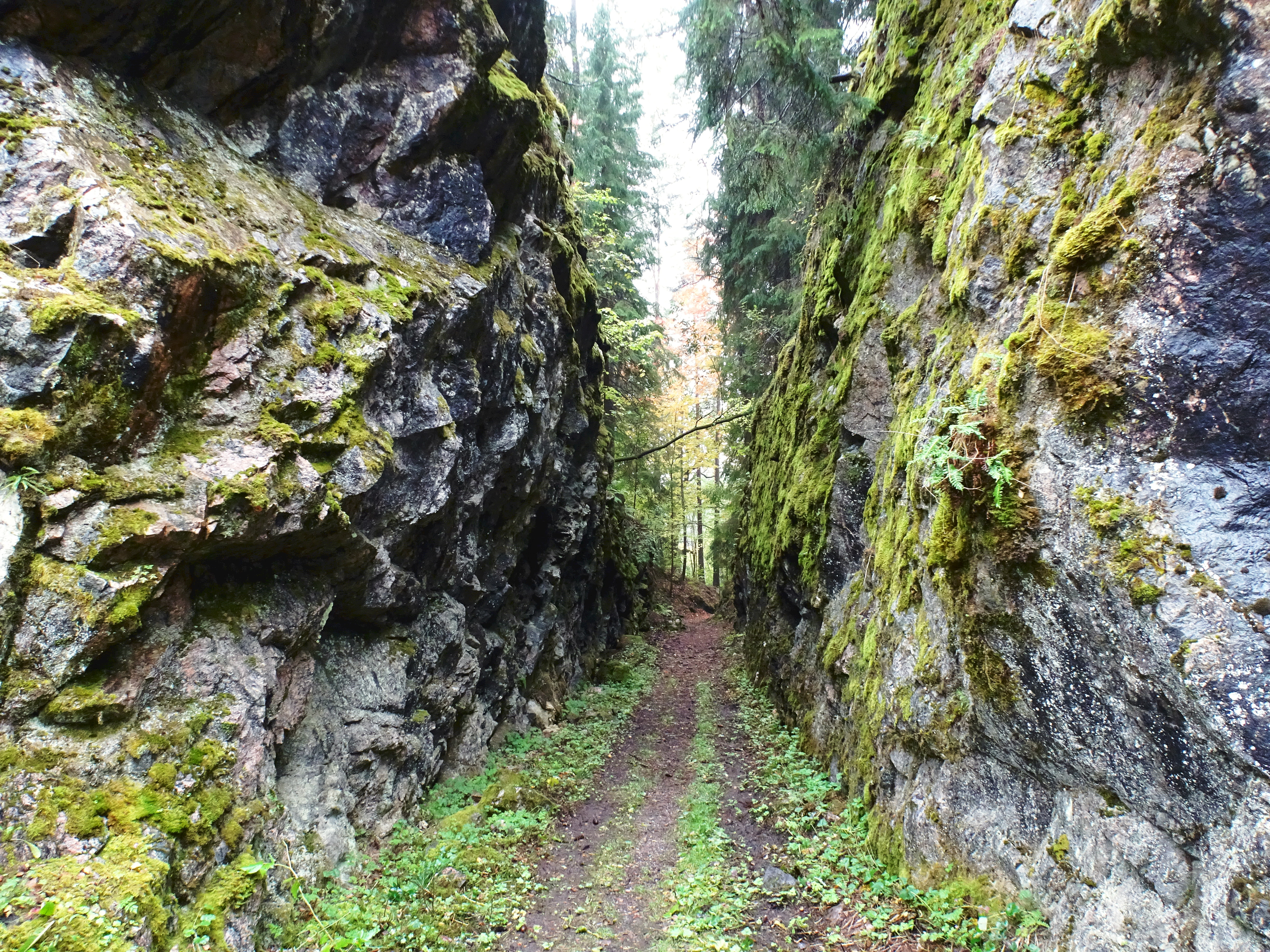
This became a film scene in the film when Mattis rides out and looks for Ronja. It is a mountain crevasse in the limestone quarry at Kalkbro in Södermanland.

When Mattis kidnaps Birk to force Borka's group away, Ronia turns herself in as ransom to Borka's clan in order to get Birk returned to his family. Mattis is hurt by his daughter's action and denies his daughter. This act forces Birk and Ronia to run away from their families, living in a cave, as their parents refuse to get over their enmity. Eventually Mattis comes to visit the children in the cave and apologises for his foolishness and having cast away his daughter.

The clans organise a fight between Borka and Mattis to settle their dispute once and for all, and Mattis is victorious. After the fight, the enemy clans finally make up and have a feast in Mattis' part of the castle.

== Cast ==
- Hanna Zetterberg as Ronja
- Dan Håfström as Birk (also as Dick Håfström)
- Börje Ahlstedt as Mattis
- Lena Nyman as Lovis
- Per Oscarsson as Borka
- Med Reventberg as Undis
- Allan Edwall as Skalle-Per
- Ulf Isenborg as Fjosok
- Henry Ottenby as Knotas
- Björn Wallde as Sturkas
- Tommy Körberg as Lill-Klippen

== Reception ==
=== Box office ===
The film was a major success, becoming the highest-grossing 1984 film in Sweden; more than 1.5 million people attended its screenings in Sweden.

=== Critical response ===
Ronia, the Robber's Daughter was viewed as a children's film, since various media houses made it appear as such. Walter Goodman, critic for The New York Times, for instance, wrote: "ALL those kids in New York who have been longing to see a movie in the original Swedish can now throng to the 23d Street Triplex, where Ronja Robbersdaughter opens today". In his review, he calls the film "a picturesque movie, filled with advertisements for Sweden's crashing waterfalls, deep woods and stony caverns".

=== Awards and honours ===
The film won Reader's Jury prize of the Berliner Morgenpost. It was in competition for a Golden Bear at the 35th Berlin International Film Festival in 1985, where it was awarded a Silver Berlin Bear for outstanding artistic contribution. Additionally, the film was considered for the 58th Academy Awards as one of the best in the category of Foreign Language Films. Though it was disputed and eliminated from the list of contestants, its proposal shows that it merited to some extent.

== Other adaptations ==
Besides the film, the story was also adapted into musicals, stage plays, and TV series.

The novel was adapted as a Japanese anime as Ronja, the Robber's Daughter in 2014, developed by Goro Miyazaki and Studio Ghibli. The storyline in the animation is similar to that in the original film.

A live-action TV series of the same name was released in 2024. Hans Rosenfeldt wrote the script while Lisa James Larsson directed the series. The series was produced by Filmlance Productions, the company behind Swedish TV productions such as Beck, Bron, and Caliphate.

A stage play based on the novel was written by Allison Gregory.

== See also ==
- List of submissions to the 58th Academy Awards for Best Foreign Language Film
- List of Swedish submissions for the Academy Award for Best International Feature Film
