= The Brothers Lionheart (film) =

- Swedish DVD cover
- Directed by: Olle Hellbom
- Written by: Astrid Lindgren
- Produced by: Olle Nordemar; Olle Hellbom
- Starring: Staffan Götestam; Lars Söderdahl; Allan Edwall; Gunn Wållgren; Folke Hjort; Per Oscarsson
- Music by: Björn Isfält; Lasse Dahlberg
- Distributed by: Svensk Filmindustri
- Release date: 23 September 1977 (Sweden)
- Running time: 102 minutes
- Country: Sweden
- Language: Swedish

The Brothers Lionheart (Swedish: Bröderna Lejonhjärta) is a Swedish fantasy film which was released to cinemas in Sweden on 23 September 1977, directed by Olle Hellbom and based on the 1973 book of the same name, written by Astrid Lindgren. It won Sweden's Guldbagge Award for Best Director in 1978.

== Cast ==
- Lars Söderdahl as Karl "Skorpan" Lion(-heart)
- Staffan Götestam as Jonatan Lion(-heart)
- Allan Edwall as Mattias
- Gunn Wållgren as Sofia
- Folke Hjort as Jossi
- Per Oscarsson as Orvar
- Tommy Johnson as Hubert
- Jan Nygren as Veder, Tengil's soldier
- Michael "Micha" Gabay as Kader, Tengil's soldier
- Georg Årlin as Tengil
- Bertil Norström as Pjuke, Tengil's advisor

== Production ==
The film was shot in Sweden, Denmark and Iceland. Filming locations included Stockholm for studio interiors and the openings sequence, while Skåne County in Sweden and Århus in Jutland represented Nangijala, while Þingvellir and Dimmuborgir in Iceland represented the lands of Tengil.

Upon release, unique for adaptations of Lindgren's work, it was given an 11 certificate by the Swedish board of censors, causing the Riksdag to enact an age limit of 7 and above for future films. The film nevertheless maintained the age limit of 11 and above for years until a 7 limit, called "Lex Lejonhjärta", was deemed acceptable.

The source work is widely considered, although the violent content is much toned down on screen, the most political and violent of Lindgren's books, involving themes of dictatorship, occupation, treason, democide, war, suicide and forced labour of nigh-Holocaustian reminiscence. Most of the named characters do not survive the film (although its setting in concurrent realities soften this fact). In a cruel quirk of fate, actor Folke Hjort drowned in a diving accident less than three months before its release, a fate shared with his character in the film and book.

Nevertheless, it has maintained its place as one of the most beloved and iconic adaptations, and films overall, although several technical aspects, such as the Katla model, are considered well out of date, and several lines from the film are widely culturally understood and in widespread use, such as "All power to Tengil, our liberator!" (in original Swedish: All makt åt Tengil, vår befriare!), a truism (used ironically out of context) pronounced to proclaim loyalty and submission to the autocratic occupational power of Lord Tengil of Karmanjaka.

== Reception ==
=== Box office ===
In Sweden, the film grossed SEK 8,963,000 (equivalent to SEK 48,498,875 in 2023) at the box office. Its screenings were attended by 553,000 people.

=== Differences from the novel ===
Although the film mostly stays true to the book some notable differences can be seen:

- In the novel Hubert is described having long, curly red hair and a big, bristly beard, while actor Tommy Johnson had short, normal red hair and a moustache.
- In the novel, Jonatan rescues one of Tengil's soldiers who is later killed in the battle. This soldier does not appear in the film.
- In the book when Karl tries to find Jonatan one night, he stays in a cave where he suddenly gets surrounded by angry wolves but is quickly saved by Hubert. This is omitted in the film.
- In the book Jossi tells Veder and Kader about Karl after getting the "Katla mark" on his chest. In the film when he arrives, he tells them before getting labeled with the mark.
- In the novel the "Katla mark" is a dragonhead. It was a flame in the film.
- Veder and Kader's fate is not shown. In the book they are killed by Orvar and Sofia.
- In the book, Mattias dies at some point during the final battle against Tengil's forces. In the film, he is killed by a thrown spear before the battle starts after one of Tengil's men sees him release a white dove carrying a message to Orvar.
- Karm, the lindworm is omitted completely. Karm is described in the novel as Katla's enemy and that he has been around since the dawn of time awaiting the moment he will get to kill Katla. As he is restricted to water and Katla to land, this has been impossible until Jonatan pushes a rock onto Katla, making her fall into the Karma Falls. In the film, Katla is simply knocked over a ledge by the rock dislodged by Jonatan and perishes in a pool of boiling mud.
- The ending is softened a bit and does not explicitly show the brothers committing suicide (or leaving Nangiala for Nangilima).

=== Critical response ===
The film was well received by Swedish critics. Often interpreting the film in contemporary terms, they compared Staffan Götestam's portrayal of Jonatan to Che Guevara, and Georg Årlin's portrayal of Tengil to Adolf Hitler, Joseph Stalin, Augusto Pinochet, Richard Nixon and Saddam Hussein.

=== Accolades ===
- 1978 Guldbagge Award for Best Direction (Olle Hellbom)
- 1978 Berlin International Film Festival, OCIC Award (Special Mention)

- Golden Bear nomination (Olle Hellbom)

- 1982 Fantafestival, Best Direction (Olle Hellbom)
