= Allrakäraste syster (film) =

1988 Swedish film directed by Göran Carmback

- Directed by: Göran Carmback
- Screenplay by: Astrid Lindgren
- Produced by: Waldemar Bergendahl
- Cinematography: Jens Fischer
- Edited by: Jan Persson
- Music by: Björn Isfält; Göran Ringbom
- Release date: 1988
- Running time: 29 minutes
- Country: Sweden
- Language: Swedish

Allrakäraste syster is a 1988 Swedish film directed by Göran Carmback and based on the novel Most Beloved Sister by Astrid Lindgren.

== Plot ==
Barbro feels a bit lonely in her family. Her father loves her mother the most and her mother loves Barbro's brother Jonas the most. Barbro's dearest birthday wish is to get a dog, but it is too expensive for the family.

Barbro, however, has a secret: she has a twin sister called Ylva-Li, who lives in a secret land called Salikon, under the rose bushes in the garden, where she is queen. Ylva-Li and Barbro experiences many adventures. In addition, Barbro has everything she could wish for: two dogs, a cat, horses, food that she likes, unforgettable experiences, etc. Furthermore, Ylva-Li loves Barbro more than anything else and calls her her most beloved sister.

The day before her birthday, Barbro visits Ylva-Li. The girls make a trip to the most beautiful valley in the world. The sisters have to pass the dark forest of fear, where the evil ones live. When they arrive at the most beautiful valley in the world, Ylva-Li and Barbro enjoy a wonderful day there. Ylva-Li then delivers some bad news to her twin sister. If the roses in front of the entrance to Salikon have withered, it means that Ylva-Li is dead. Desperately, Barbro runs home and her mother cannot comfort Barbro.

When Barbro gets up on her birthday, she gets a puppy. Her parents had just pretended that they could not afford the dog to surprise Barbro. When Barbro goes out into the garden, she discovers that the roses have withered in front of the entrance of Salikon. The entrance to Salikon no longer exists. Barbro is sad, but is happily greeted by her puppy dog Ruff, who cheers her up. Barbro and Ruff go for a walk together.

== Cast ==
- Elin Elgestad: Barbro
- Ulla Elgestad: Ylva-Li
- Anki Lidén: Mamma
- Helge Skoog: Pappa
- Saga Wolgers: Jonas
- Bengt-Åke Byfeldt: Nicko

== Background ==
Allrakäraste syster was first broadcast on 2 December 1988 on Swedish television. A broadcast in Germany and a DVD release in Sweden and Germany followed.

== Reception ==
=== Critical response ===
Anna Zamolska from KinderundJugendmedien.de said that Allrakäraste syster is "a wistful, serious fairy tale". It stands out "from other fairy-tale film adaptations by its serious and sad atmosphere" and takes up "some of the most beautiful allegories from Lindgren's books". She also praised the acting performance of the two leading actresses and the music. The symbolic content of the story is comparable to that of the Brothers Lionheart, as a similar type of love between siblings is shown here. With "it's fairy-tale happenings in our everyday world" it seems like a "Kafkaesque short story for children".
