= Hanna Zetterberg =

Swedish politician and actress

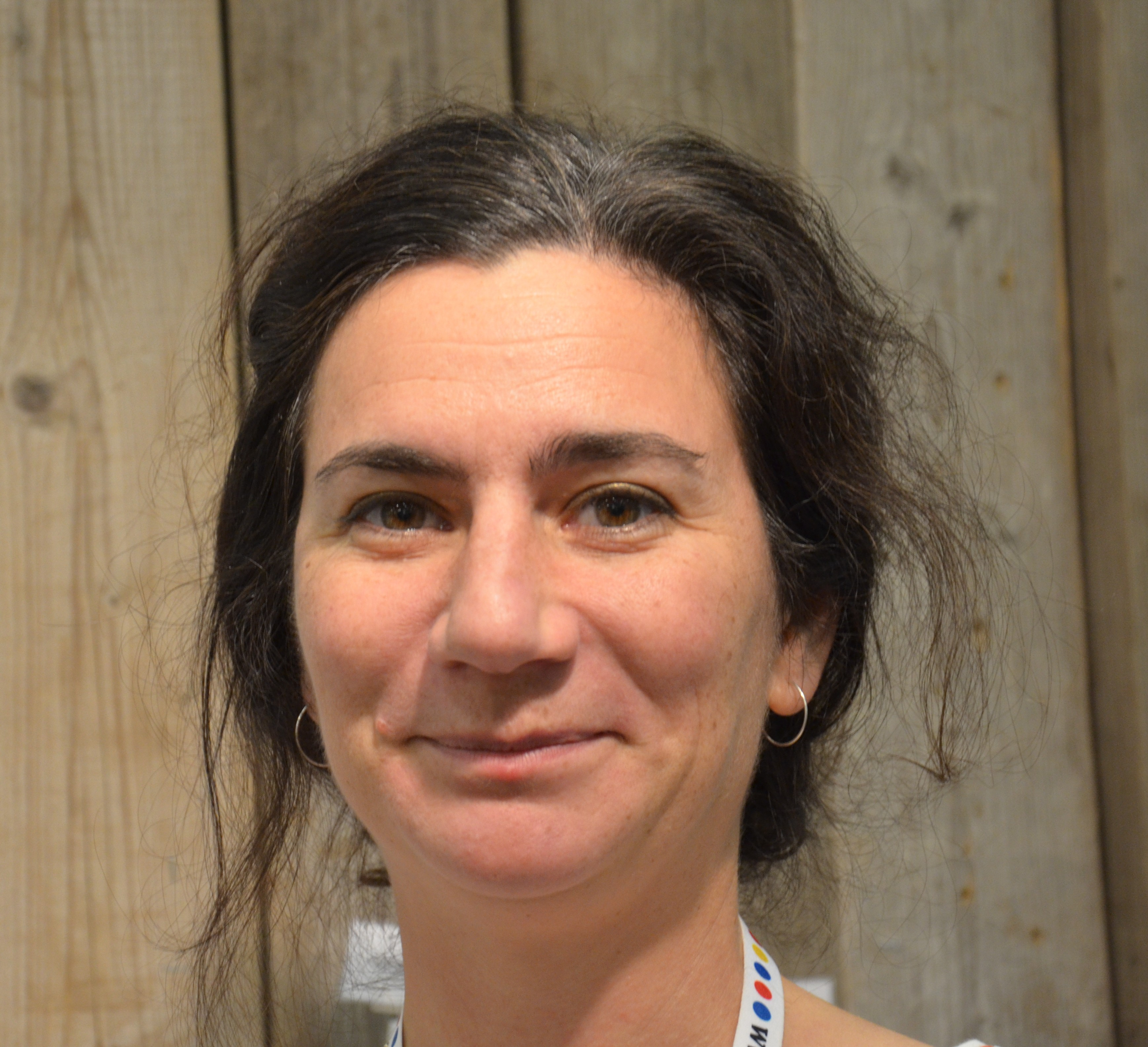

member of the Riksdag
- In office 1994–1998

Personal details
- Born: 15 February 1973 (age 52) Stockholm, Sweden
- Party: Left Party
- Website: http://www.hannazetterberg.se/

Hanna Zetterberg (born 15 February 1973 in Stockholm) is a former Swedish Left Party politician and member of the Riksdag 1994–1998.

At the age of 11, Zetterberg played the eponymous leading role in the 1984 film Ronia, the Robber's Daughter based on the children's book of the same name by Astrid Lindgren.
