= Karlsson på taket (film) =

- Directed by: Vibeke Idsøe
- Produced by: Waldemar Bergendahl
- Distributed by: Filmkameratene A/S; MFA Filmdistribution; Svensk Filmindustri Universum Film; A. Film Eesti; Accio; FilmTeknikk Norge; Jingjok Animation; Wang Film Productions Company
- Release date: 27 September 2002 (Sweden)
- Running time: 77 minutes
- Country: Sweden
- Language: Swedish

Karlsson på taket is a 2002 Swedish animated feature film directed by Vibeke Idsøe.

== Cast ==
- Börje Ahlstedt – Karlsson på taket
- William Svedberg – Svante "Junior" Svantesson
- Pernilla August – Mrs. Svantesson, mother
- Allan Svensson – Mr. Svantesson, father
- Margaretha Krook – Miss Hildur Bock
- Nils Eklund – Uncle Julius Jansson
- Magnus Härenstam – Filip "Fille", thief
- Brasse Brännström – Rudolf "Rulle", thief
- Leo Magnusson – Bosse Svantesson
- Ellen Ekdahl – Bettan Svantesson
- Greta Rechlin – Gunilla, classmate
- Jonatan Skifs – Krister, classmate
- Steve Kratz – Fireman
- Maria Rydberg – Teacheress
- Per Sandborgh – Newsreader
