= Humlan Djojj =

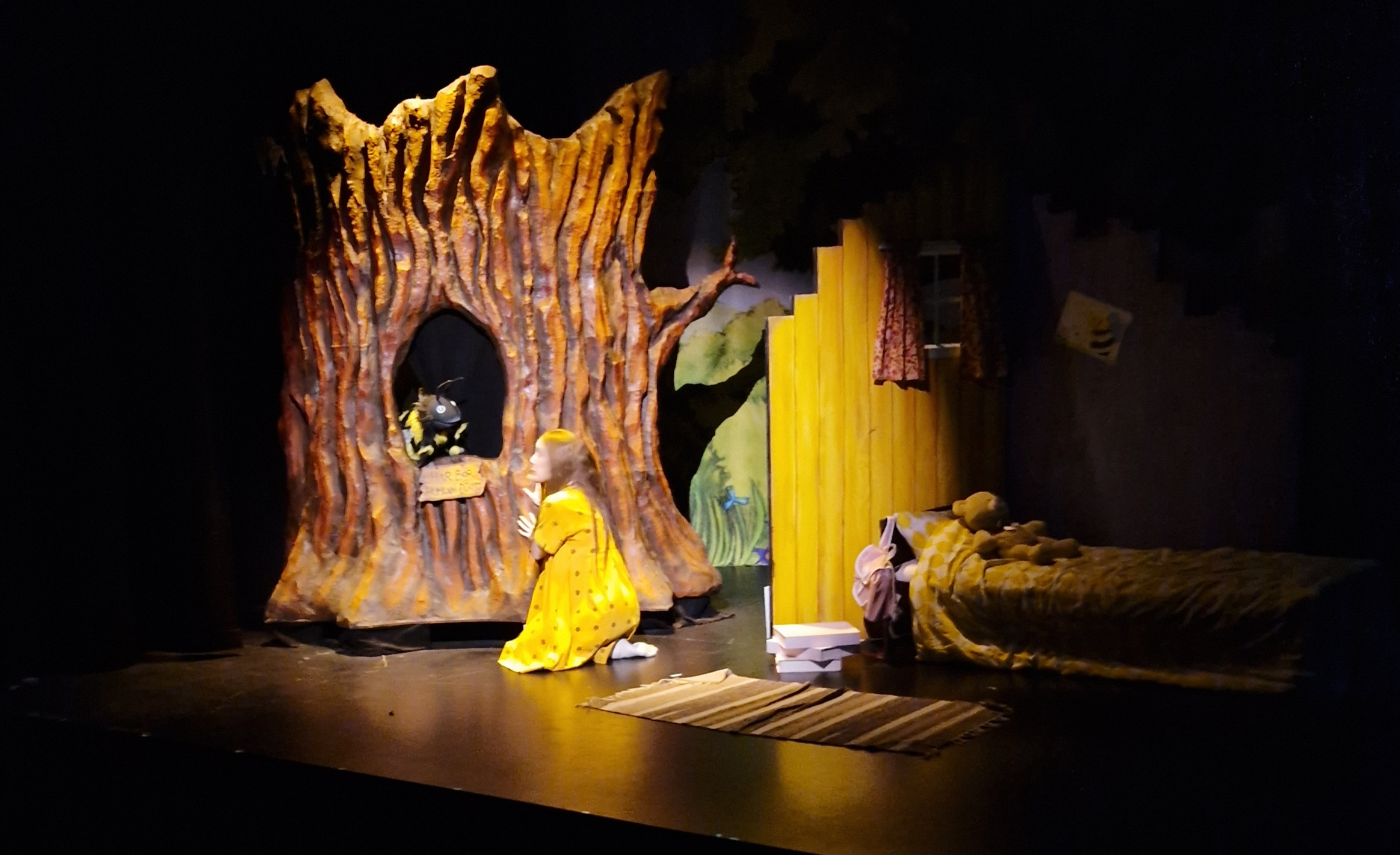
Humlan Djojj in a theater play

Humlan Djojj (en:Djojj the Bumble Bee) is a Swedish fictional character created by writer and theatre director Staffan Götestam. Humlan Djojj was first published in the children's book Humlan Djojj, Godnatt as Djojj! in 2019 as an audiobook. The character has also appeared in theater. Humlan Djojj has also released several chart placing songs. Humlan Djojj collaborated with the agency UNICEF between November 2025 and New Years all proceeds from the music was donated to the agency.

== Discography ==
=== Singles ===
Title	Year	Peak chart positions	Album
Title	Year	SWE	Album
"Djurens vaggvisa"	2026	1	Non-album singles
