= Gull-Pian =

1988 film by Staffan Götestam

- Directed by: Staffan Götestam
- Screenplay by: Astrid Lindgren
- Produced by: Waldemar Bergendahl
- Cinematography: Jens Fischer
- Edited by: Nina Wedberg Thulin
- Music by: Anders Berglund
- Release date: 1988
- Running time: 29 minutes
- Country: Sweden
- Language: Swedish

Gull-Pian is a 1988 Swedish film directed by Staffan Götestam and based on the novel of the same name by Astrid Lindgren.

== Story ==
Eva's father is in West India and Eva's mother is hospitalized because she has tuberculosis. Therefore, Eva lives with her Aunt Ester. She has a doll named Via-Lisa, who she loves more than anything else. Via-Lisa is the only one who gives comfort to Eva. Eva's cousin Berit is mean to Eva and bullies Eva whenever she can.

Berit calls Via-Lisa Dirt Doll and steals her from Eva over and over again. She also keeps saying that Eva's mother is about to die and that Eva's father will drown in the sea. For Eva's aunts Greta and Ester, Eva is a "nasty little thing" who is as bad as they think Eva's mother was and is.

They do not want to see that Berit is the one that bullies Eva. Eva's aunts just take care of Eva because they have to and want to get rid of her as soon as possible. Berit is treated by her aunts like a little angel and Eva is badly treated. When Berit behaves badly, Eva is usually blamed for it.

During thunderstorms with pouring rain, Eva is sent to the city to get potato flour. When Eva arrives at the store, she is wet and shivering from the cold. The merchant Eriksson is horrified that her aunts have sent Eva such a long way just to get potato flour during this weather.

He takes care of Eva, warms her up and gives her a candy. Eva asks Eriksson what kind of illness tuberculosis is and whether one can die from it. Eriksson says that Eva can die from it, but also says that Eva's mother will not die from it. He adds that her mother will soon be well and can take Eva home. Encouraged by his words Eva happily returns home.

She sees that Berit has thrown her beloved doll Via-Lisa into the dirt. Angrily, she slams the flour on the table, into her aunts and cousin's faces and tells them that she doesn't care about any of them. Then Eva jumps around happily with her doll.

== Cast ==
- Zara Zetterqvist: Eva
- Hanna Alström: Berit
- Ewa Roos: Aunt Greta
- Cecilia Haglund: Aunt Ester
- Mats Bergman: Salesman Eriksson

== Background ==
Produced in 1988, Gull-Pian was first broadcast on 23 March 1989 in Sweden. Later it was also shown on German television. After that it was released on DVD in both Sweden and Germany. In the German version the film was cut to 25 minutes.

== Reception ==
=== Critical response ===
Filmtipset.se called Gull-Pian a fantastic but also sad film, because of Eva being treated so unfairly, but ultimately, it has a great end, and is also very moving. The two main actresses, Zara Zetterqvist and Hanna Alström, were praised for their performances. The child's perspective on loneliness, grief, family and hope are shown. Furthermore, it shows the ability to turn leaves and see new opportunities.

Allatvkanaler.se gave the film eight out of ten stars.
