= Bill Bergson =

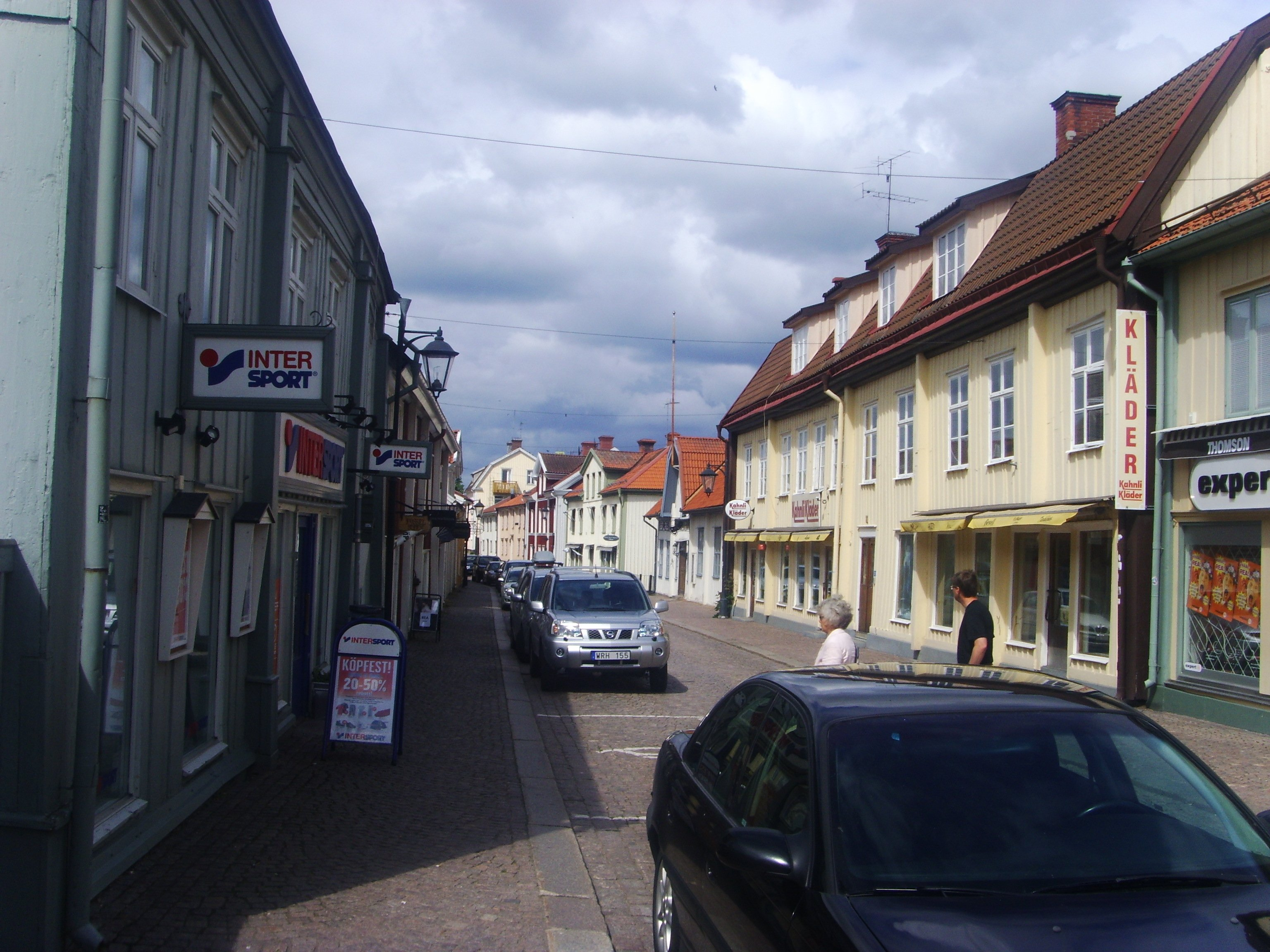
- The character's hometown Lillköping is inspired by Vimmerby
- First appearance: 1946
- Created by: Astrid Lindgren

In-universe information
- Gender: Male

Bill Bergson (Swedish: Kalle Blomkvist) is a fictional character created by Swedish writer Astrid Lindgren. The first book featuring him was published in 1946.

Lindgren's detective story is about Bill Bergson, a more-or-less ordinary Swedish boy with an extraordinary fascination with detective work. He lives in the small town Lillköping. He identifies clues, investigates enigmas, and solves the riddle surrounding a mysterious stranger while the police and other adults overlook or dismiss the whole matter. He and his friends several times solve real crimes including mysterious thefts, murder and kidnapping. Lindgren wrote shorthand for Harry Söderman, a doctor in criminology, and it was during this work that she learned the basics of criminology that she later used in her stories.

Bill and his friends also play a game they call the Wars of the Roses. He, along with his two friends Anders and Eva-Lotta, are the White Rose, while three other kids, Sixten, Jonte and Benka, are the Red Rose. They "fight" over the possession of Stormumriken, an oddly-shaped stone. The group that does not have the stone must use all their wits and energy to obtain it. The group that has the stone must give the other group clues on where to find it.

Although there is a "war" between the two roses, all six of the youngsters are good friends and there is simply a playful rivalry between them. The Red Roses help the Whites when they are threatened by real dangers.

Lindgren wrote three books about Bill Bergson:

- 1946 – Bill Bergson, Master Detective (original title: Mästerdetektiven Blomkvist)
- 1951 – Bill Bergson Lives Dangerously (original title: Mästerdetektiven Blomkvist lever farligt)
- 1953 – Bill Bergson and the White Rose Rescue (original title: Kalle Blomkvist och Rasmus)

Three theater plays:

- 1950 – Mästerdetektiven Blomkvist (published in the book Sex pjäser för barn och ungdom, based on the novel Mästerdetektiven Blomkvist)
- 1955 – Mästerdetektiven Kalle Blomkvist: För kasperteater två korta akter (published in the book Serverat, Ers Majestät! by Elsa Olenius, new story)
- 1968 – Kalle Blomkvist, Nisse Nöjd och Vicke på Vind (published in the book Pjäser för barn och ungdom – andra samlingen, new story)

== English translations ==
Viking edition

- 1952 – Bill Bergson, Master Detective/Mästerdetektiven Blomkvist. Translated from the Swedish by Herbert Antoine; illustrated by Louis Glanzman. 200 pages; illustrations; 21 cm. New York: Viking Press, 1952, 1957, reprinted in Viking Seafarer ed. 1968. LCCN: 52-12922
- 1954 – Bill Bergson Lives Dangerously/Mästerdetektiven Blomkvist lever farligt. Translated from the Swedish by Herbert Antoine; illustrated by Don Freeman. 214 pages; illustrations; 21 cm. New York, Viking Press, 1954, reprinted in 1965. LCCN: 54-4337
- 1965 – Bill Bergson and the White Rose Rescue/Kalle Blomkvist och Rasmus. Translated from the Swedish by Florence Lamborn; illustrated by Don Freeman. 215 pages; illustrations; 21 cm. New York: Viking Press, 1965. LCCN: 65-13358

Oxford edition

- 2017 – Master Detective/Mästerdetektiven Blomkvist. Translated by Susan Beard. 170 pages; 20 cm. Oxford: Oxford University Press, 2017. ISBN 9780192749277 (paperback)
- 2017 – Living Dangerously/Mästerdetektiven Blomkvist lever farligt. Translated by Susan Beard. 211 pages; 20 cm. Oxford: Oxford University Press, 2017. ISBN 9780192749291
- 2018 – The White Rose Rescue/Kalle Blomkvist och Rasmus. Translated by Susan Beard. 197 pages; 20 cm. Oxford: Oxford University Press, 2018. ISBN 9780192749314

== Films about Bill Bergson ==
- 1947 – Bill Bergson, Master Detective
- 1953 – Bill Bergson and the White Rose Rescue
- 1957 – Bill Bergson Lives Dangerously
- 1966 – Mästerdetektiven Blomkvist på nya äventyr
- 1996 – Bill Bergson Lives Dangerously (remake)
- 1997 – Bill Bergson and the White Rose Rescue (remake)

== Legacy ==
The character Mikael Blomkvist in Stieg Larsson's Millenium novel series is dubbed "Kalle Blomkvist" by the press to mock him in his investigative reporting. Lisbeth Salander's name appears to be taken from Eva-Lotta Lisander, and is modeled on Lindgren's other famous character, Pippi Longstocking.

In The Girl with the Dragon Tattoo, three of Lindgren's books are mentioned: The Children of Noisy Village, Bill Bergson and the White Rose Rescue (although in the book the translation was Kalle Blomkvist and Rasmus from the original Kalle Blomkvist och Rasmus), and Pippi Longstocking.

The relation between Astrid Lindgren and, at least, the first part of the trilogy, is implied when a cat in the novel is named 'Tjorven'. The name comes from the Swedish television series Life on Seacrow Island based on a script by Astrid Lindgren and not originally a book. Apart from this, the TV show dates from the early sixties, around the time when, in Stieg Larsson's novel, one of the crucial events which shapes the story takes place.

== See also ==
- Rövarspråket
- Encyclopedia Brown
- The Hardy Boys
- Nancy Drew
- The Adventures of Tintin
- The Famous Five
