= Patrik Bergner =

Swedish actor, film director and playwright

- Born: Lars Patrik Viktor Berger; 12 June 1962 (age 64); Stockholm, Sweden
- Occupations: Film director, Actor
- Years active: 1987-2002

Lars Patrik Viktor Bergner (born 12 June 1962 in Stockholm, Sweden) is a Swedish actor, film director and playwright.

== Selected filmography ==
- 1987 - Nionde kompaniet
- 1994 - Illusioner
- 1994 - Den vite riddaren (TV)
- 1997 - Kalle Blomkvist och Rasmus
- 1998 - Rederiet (TV)
