= Festival (2001 film) =

2001 film by Karl Johan Larsson

- Theatrical release poster
- Directed by: Karl Johan Larsson
- Written by: Katali Jarefjäll; Henning Lindblad; Jan Palmblad; Marietta von Hausswolff von Baumgarten
- Screenplay by: Jan Palmblad
- Produced by: Jens Bohman; Eric Broberg; Jan Palmblad; Janne Wallin; Örjan Woldoff
- Starring: Ebba Hultkvist; Jesper Salén
- Cinematography: Jens Jansson
- Edited by: Pierre Laurent
- Music by: Joel Eriksson; Martin Janson; Ulf Kjellberg; Gaili Schoen
- Production companies: MiddleEarth Entertainment; Götafilm; MTV Produktion; Rush Push Cash Pictures; TV4; Buena Vista International
- Distributed by: Buena Vista International
- Release date: 16 February 2001 (Sweden)
- Running time: 95 minutes
- Country: Sweden
- Language: Swedish

Festival is a 2001 Swedish drama film directed by Karl Johan Larsson, and starring Ebba Hultkvist.

== Plot ==
Lina is 17 years old and is planning to visit the Arvika festival with her boyfriend Calle. However, her mother opposes the trip, but after some persuasion from Calle and her best friend Milla, Lina decides to go anyway. During the festival, a series of events comes to affect the lives of these young people.

== Selected cast ==
- Ebba Hultkvist - Lina
- Jesper Salén - Calle
- Källa Bie - Milla
- Martin Aliaga - Marc
- Ralph Carlsson - Calle's father
- Sverrir Gudnason - Lukas
- David Boati - Ola
- Yankho Kamwendo - Theo
- Cary Ylitalo - Bill
- Catherine Hansson - Lina's mother
- Claudia Galli - Girl at the festival
