= Folke Hjort =

Swedish actor (1934–1977)

Folke Karl-Gustav Hjort (28 March 1934 – 3 July 1977) was a Swedish actor. A prolific theatre actor of his time, he is now most recognised for his role as Jossi in Olle Hellbom's adaption of The Brothers Lionheart.

== Career ==
He was born 28 March 1934 in Stockholm and grew up in Alingsås.

He collapsed and drowned 3 July 1977 in a diving accident at Lysekil during a diving trip in the archipelago outside Gothenburg, three months before the latter film's release, which was his last feature film.

== Selected filmography ==
- 1972 – Skärgårdsflirt (TV)
- 1973 – Om 7 flickor
- 1976 – The Man on the Roof
- 1977 – The Brothers Lionheart
