= Göran Carmback =

Swedish film director and screenwriter

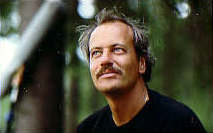
- Göran Carmback in June 2012
- Born: 28 August 1944 (age 81); Södertälje, Sweden
- Occupation: film director
- Years active: 1988-

Hans Göran Carmback (born 29 May 1950 in Södertälje, Sweden) is a Swedish film director and screenwriter. He worked with audio engineering before his 1st film as director in 1988. Now he's directing TV dramatics.

== Selected filmography ==
- 1988 - Allra käraste syster (director)
- 1988 - Ingen rövare finns i skogen (director)
- 1989 - 1939 (director)
- 1994 - Tre Kronor (director)
- 1996 - Kalle Blomkvist – Mästerdetektiven lever farligt (director)
- 1997 - Kalle Blomkvist och Rasmus (director and screenwriter)
- 1997 - Skilda världar (TV) (director)
- 2002 - Skeppsholmen (TV series) (director)
