= William Svedberg =

Swedish actor

Leo William Emanuel Svedberg (born 17 March 1992) is a Swedish actor.

== Selected filmography ==
- 1997 - Bill Bergson and the White Rose Rescue (Kalle Blomkvist och Rasmus)
- 1999 - Julens hjältar (TV)
- 1999 - Mamy Blue
- 1999 - Stora & små Mirakel
- 2002 - Karlsson på taket (film)
- 2004 - Veddemålet
- 2005 - Skattejakten
