= Max Herbrechter =

German actor (born 1958)

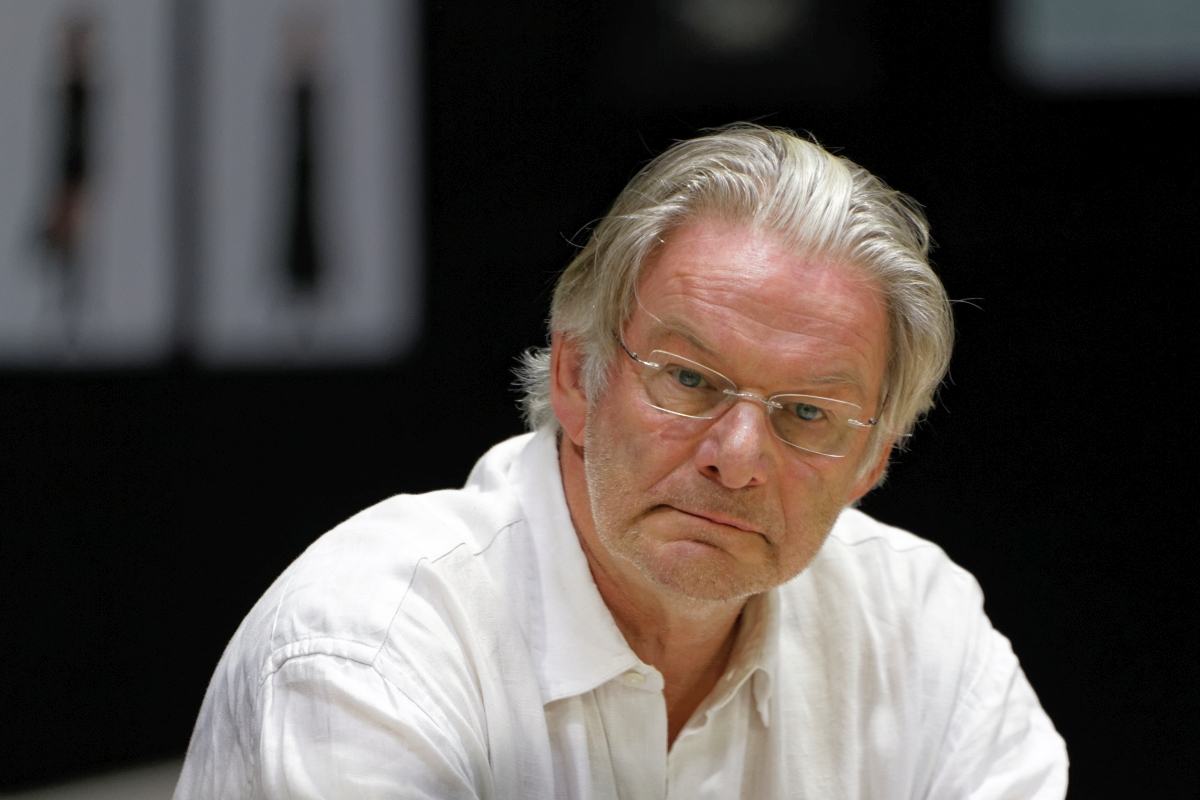
- Herbrechter in 2023
- Born: 12 March 1958 (age 67); Dortmund, North Rhine-Westphalia, West Germany
- Occupation: Actor
- Awards: See Awards

Max Herbrechter (born 12 March 1958) is a German actor living in Hamburg.

== Filmography (selection) ==
- 1983: Diese Drombuschs
- 1989: Rote Erde
- 1991: Tatort: Bis zum Hals im Dreck
- 1992: Tatort: Der Mörder und der Prinz
- 1993: Freunde fürs Leben
- 1993: At Your Own Risk
- 1994: Diese Drombuschs
- 1994: Die Männer vom K3
- 1995: Großstadtrevier (television series, one episode)
- 1995: Tatort: Herz As
- 1997: Zwei Engel mit vier Fäusten
- 1997: Polizeiruf 110: Gänseblümchen (TV series)
- 1996: Adelheid und ihre Mörder (television series, episode: Liebe, Tod und Leidenschaft)
- 1997–1999: Ärzte (television series)
- 1998: Geschichten aus dem Leben (TV series)
- 1998: Lisa Falk – Eine Frau für alle Fälle (television series)
- 1999: Men and Other Catastrophes
- 1999–2003: Die Pfefferkörner
- 2000: Gran Paradiso
- 2000: Tatort: Quartett in Leipzig
- 2001: Tatort: Bienzle und der Todesschrei
- 2001: Ritas Welt (television series, episode: Frikadellenkrieg)
- 2002: Aus lauter Liebe zu Dir
- 2002, 2007: Alarm für Cobra 11 – Die Autobahnpolizei (television series, two episodes)
- 2003: Wilsberg – Wilsberg und der stumme Zeuge
- 2003: Lottoschein ins Glück
- 2003: Ein starkes Team: Kollege Mörder (television movie)
- 2004: Wie erziehe ich meine Eltern?
- 2005–2007: Doppelter Einsatz
- 2006: Tatort: Das verlorene Kind
- 2006: Tatort: Pauline
- 2007: Der Dicke (television series, one episode)
- 2007–2012: Der Staatsanwalt (television series, three episodes)
- 2007: The Heart Is a Dark Forest
- 2008, 2012: Notruf Hafenkante (television series, episodes Das verlassene Kind and Der Prozess)
- 2008: Im Tal der wilden Rosen – Zerrissene Herzen
- 2008: Der Winzerkönig
- 2008: What if Death Do Us Part?
- 2009: Zwei Ärzte sind einer zu viel: Der Schatz im Silbersee
- 2009: Giulias Verschwinden
- 2009: Entführung in London
- 2009: Schwarzwaldliebe
- 2010: Rock It!
- 2011: A Family of Three
- 2011: Holger sacht nix
- 2011: Murder in the Best Family
- 2012: Der Landarzt
- 2012: Der letzte Bulle (television series, one episode)
- 2012: Der Cop und der Snob (television series, one episode)
- 2012: Inga Lindström – Die Sache mit der Liebe
- 2013: The Almost Perfect Man
- 2014: Pettson & Findus: Fun Stuff
- 2014: Die Mamba
- 2014: Für immer ein Mörder – Der Fall Ritter (television movie)
- 2014: Blütenträume
- 2015: Schuld nach Ferdinand von Schirach (television series episode: Volksfest)
- 2016: We Are the Tide (cinema movie)
- 2016: Tatort: Durchgedreht
- 2017: SOKO Kitzbühel (television series, episode: Sport ist Mord)
- 2017: A Smile in the Night
- 2018: Ein starkes Team: Tödlicher Seitensprung
- 2018: Morden im Norden (television series, episode: Liebesblind)
- 2018–2019: Daheim in den Bergen (television series)
  - 2018: Liebesleid
  - 2018: Schwesternliebe
  - 2019: Liebesreigen
  - 2019: Schuld und Vergebung
- 2019: Der Alte (television series, episode "Das perfekte Opfer")
- 2019: Zimmer mit Stall – Berge versetzen (television movie)
- 2019: Inga Lindström – Familienfest in Sommerby
- 2019: Die Toten von Salzburg – Wolf im Schafspelz
- 2020: Die Heiland – Wir sind Anwalt (television series, episode: Der Mann im Wald)

== Awards ==
- 1998: Auslands-Studenten-Oscar
- 2009: Rose d'Or (nominated). Category: Drama
- 2009: Publikumspreis at the Film Festival Locarno Piazza Grande
- 2010: Prix Walo (nominated)
