= Källa Bie =

Swedish actress (born 1974)

Källa Bie (born 1974 in Ytterhogdal, Hälsingland, Sweden) is a Swedish actress. After her role in Festival (2001), she trained as a midwife and decreased the frequency of her acting appearances.

== Filmography ==
- Arne Dahl: Bad Blood (2012; TV movie)
- Stormen (2009; TV series)
- En spricka i kristallen (2007)
- Beck – Skarpt läge (2006)
- Festival (2001)
- c/o Segemyhr (1999)
- Vuxna människor (1999)
