= Love Me! =

1986 film

- Directed by: Kay Pollak
- Written by: Kay Pollak; Johanna Hald; Ola Olsson
- Produced by: Klas Olofsson
- Starring: Anna Lindén
- Cinematography: Roland Sterner
- Edited by: Thomas Holéwa
- Release date: 28 February 1986
- Running time: 126 minutes
- Country: Sweden
- Language: Swedish

Love Me! (Swedish: Älska mej) is a 1986 Swedish drama film directed by Kay Pollak. It was entered into the 36th Berlin International Film Festival.

== Cast ==
- Anna Lindén as Sussie
- Örjan Ramberg as 'Oxen'
- Tomas Fryk as Tomas
- Hans Strååt as Larsson
- Tomas Laustiola as Gunnar
- Ernst Günther Jr. as Social services inspector
- Lena Granhagen as Martha
- Jenny Kai-Larsen as Ann
- Gun Ahnlund
- Carl-Olof Alm
- Elisabet Palo as The mother
- Stig Torstensson as 'Kattmannen'
