= Lars Söderdahl =

Swedish former actor (born 1964)

Lars Rune Söderdahl (current name Peter Rune Eriksson) (born 26 July 1964 in Tyresö, Sweden) is a Swedish former actor, best known for his roles as Skorpan in The Brothers Lionheart and as Lillebror in Karlsson-on-the-Roof, both works are written by Astrid Lindgren.

== Selected filmography ==
- 1977 - Himmel och pannkaka (TV)
- 1977 - The Brothers Lionheart
- 1974 - Karlsson-on-the-Roof

== Bibliography ==
- Holmstrom, John. The Moving Picture Boy: An International Encyclopaedia from 1895 to 1995. Norwich, Michael Russell, 1996, p. 367.
