= Adult Behavior =

1999 film

- Directed by: Felix Herngren; Fredrik Lindström
- Produced by: Waldemar Bergendahl
- Starring: Felix Herngren; Karin Bjurström
- Release date: 24 September 1999
- Running time: 1h 31min
- Country: Sweden
- Language: Swedish

Adult Behavior (Swedish: Vuxna människor) is a 1999 Swedish comedy film directed by Felix Herngren and Fredrik Lindström.

== Cast ==
- Felix Herngren - Frank Philgren
- Karin Bjurström - Nenne Philgren
- Cecilia Ljung - Rosie
- Mikael Persbrandt - Georg
- Källa Bie - Sofia
- Fredrik Lindström - Markus
- Alvin Nyström - Robin
- Magnus Härenstam - Frank's boss
