= Erika Höghede =

Swedish actress (born 1963)

Erika Höghede (born 21 August 1963) is a Swedish actress, producer, playwright, and educator. She has appeared in many TV programs and theatre plays since 1993. Her most well known television roles include playing a sea captain and her diabolical twin on Rederiet (2000–2002), and as a doctor on S:t Mikael (1998, 1999).

She has created several SVT programs, among them Cirkuskiosken and Bella och Theo. In 2010, she became a junior lecturer at the Stockholm Academy of Dramatic Arts. She also served as Deputy Director of Studies. She has worked for Sveriges Television, UR, the Pero Theatre, the Boulevard Theatre, the Orion Theatre and the Giljotin Theatre.

Höghede was born in Sollefteå, Sweden, and also grew up in Huskvarna, Bålsta and Uppsala. She was educated at Stockholm University 1983–84. She has studied at Teaterverkstan in Stockholm and Teatret Cantabile Due in Copenhagen.

== Selected filmography ==
- 2025 - Genombrottet (TV)
- 2024 - Helikopterrånet (TV)
- 2022 - Lust (TV)
- 2022 - Riding in Darkness (TV)
- 2010 - Drottningoffret (TV)
- 2007 - Höök (TV)
- 2007 - Beck – Gamen
- 2000 - Det grovmaskiga nätet
- 2000 - Rederiet (TV)
- 1998 - Waiting for the Tenor
- 1997 - Skärgårdsdoktorn
- 1996 - Kalle Blomkvist – Mästerdetektiven lever farligt
- 1995 - Älskar, älskar inte
- 1995 - Petri tårar
