= Pelle flyttar till Komfusenbo =

1990 film by Johanna Hald

- Directed by: Johanna Hald
- Screenplay by: Johanna Hald
- Produced by: Waldemar Bergendahl
- Cinematography: Roland Skogfeldt; Anders Dahlberg; Jacob Jörgensen; Eric Börjeson
- Edited by: Tomas Tang; Johanna Hald
- Release date: 1990
- Running time: 29 minutes
- Country: Sweden
- Language: Swedish

Pelle flyttar till Komfusenbo is a 1990 Swedish film directed by Johanna Hald and based on the novel of the same name by Astrid Lindgren.

== Plot ==
Pelle is angry. His father does not find his pen and suspects that Pelle has taken it. Pelle actually took it, but he put it back in his father's coat pocket. He feels wronged and decides to move out. Later he packs his things and wants to move into the little house in the garden. He also wants to spend Christmas there. When he talks to his mother, she convinces him to move into the house again. There Pelle is lighting the candles. When his father comes home from work, he hugs Pelle. Furthermore, Pelle's father apologises to Pelle, as he has found his pen.

== Cast ==
- Mattias Johansson: Pelle
- Lena Endre: Mother
- Krister Henriksson: Father

== Background ==
Pelle flyttar till Komfusenbo was first broadcast in 1990 in Sweden. Later it was also shown on German television. After that, it was released on DVD in both Sweden and Germany.

== Reception ==
Filmtipset.se called Pelle flyttar till Komfusenbo a cute short film with good actors, but not much more.
