= 1939 (film) =

1989 film

- Directed by: Göran Carmback
- Screenplay by: Brasse Brännström, Waldemar Bergendahl
- Produced by: Waldemar Bergendahl
- Starring: Helene Egelund; Helena Bergström; Per Morberg
- Music by: Anders Berglund
- Production companies: Swedish Film Industry; Sveriges Television; Swedish Film Institute Foundation
- Release date: 25 December 1989 (Sweden)
- Country: Sweden
- Language: Swedish

1939 is a Swedish drama film which was released to cinemas in Sweden on 25 December 1989, directed by Göran Carmback. It was the Swedish Film Industry's most expensive production at the time.

== Plot ==
The film is set in Stockholm in 1939 where 18 year old Annika from Värmland comes to work as a waitress girl. In Stockholm, she meets a lively woman named Berit, and the two often go out dancing together. She also meets Bengt Hall, a wealthy man. Even though his parents do not think she is good enough for him, they get married. After a while, Bengt begins to get very jealous of her interactions with other men, and he starts to abuse her. Meanwhile, Berit has become pregnant, however she doesn't know who the father is. Annika tries to help her, but this causes Bengt to have another tantrum. When World War II finishes in May 1945, Annika moves back home to Värmland.

== Home video ==
In 1990, the film was released to VHS by Media Transfer, and to DVD in 2010 as part of the series Svenska klassiker.

== Cast ==
- Helene Egelund - Annika
- Helena Bergström - Berit
- Per Morberg - Bengt Hall
- Ingvar Hirdwall - Annika's father
- Anita Ekström - Annika's mother
- Per Oscarsson - Isak
- Per Grytt - Annika's brother
- Johan Ulveson - Harald Persson
- Stefan Larsson - Hans Zetterberg
- Keve Hjelm - Alfred Hall
- Anita Wall - Cecilia Hall
- Willie Andréason - Gustaf Persson
- Krister Henriksson - Rickard Zetterberg
- Gunilla Larsson - Eliz Zetterberg
- Gino Samil - Länsman
- Heinz Hopf - Hans Thomsen
- Runo Sundberg - Eklund
- Bjørn Aronsson - Fredriksson
- Tomas von Brömssen - Police sergeant Eriksson
- Mats Bergman - Rhöse, country trader
- Wallis Grahn - Alcohol waitress
- Anders Lönnbro - Chef
- Claes Månsson - Chef Axelsson
- Staffan Kihlbom - Klas
- Jonas Falk - Speaker
- Peter Haber - Wirén, police assistant
