= Anders Berglund =

Swedish musician

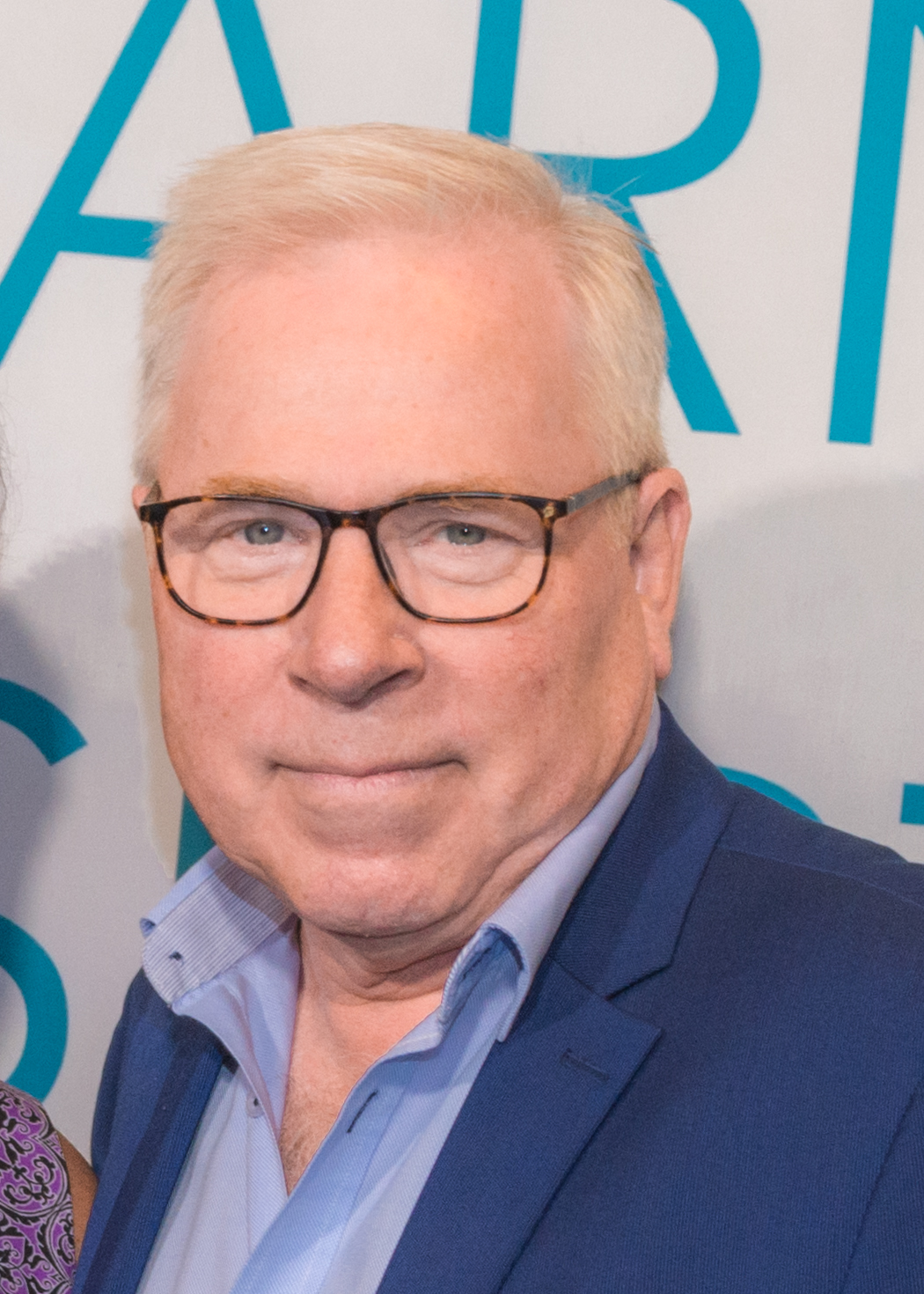
- Berglund in 2019

Background information
- Birth name: Anders Olof Berglund
- Born: 21 July 1948 (age 76); Stockholm, Sweden
- Occupation(s): arranger, composer, conductor, pianist
- Instrument: piano
- Formerly of: Blue Swede

Anders Olof Berglund (born 21 July 1948) is a Swedish arranger, composer, conductor, pianist and musician.

== Career ==
Born in Stockholm, Berglund is best known as conductor of Melodifestivalen, the Swedish final of the Eurovision Song Contest. He was musical director of the ESC when the event was hosted by Sweden in Malmö in 1992. In addition he also acted as one of the Swedish commentators for the 1999 Contest together with Pekka Heino.

In the 1970s he was a member of the band Blue Swede.

He composed the music of the musical SKÅL at the Maxim-theatre in 1985.

1997-2005 he was one of the team captains/pianists in the popular Swedish TV show Så ska det låta.

In Autumn 2007, Berglund arranged the music in the musical "Sound of Music" at the Göta Lejon.

== Selected Original Scores composed ==
- 1983 – Happy We
- 1988 – Gull-Pian
- 1989 – 1939
- 1990 – Nils Karlsson-Pyssling
- 1997 – Pippi Longstocking

Preceded by (Italy) Bruno Canfora	Eurovision Song Contest conductor 1992	Succeeded by (Republic of Ireland) Noel Kelehan
