= Margreth Weivers =

Swedish actress (1926–2021)

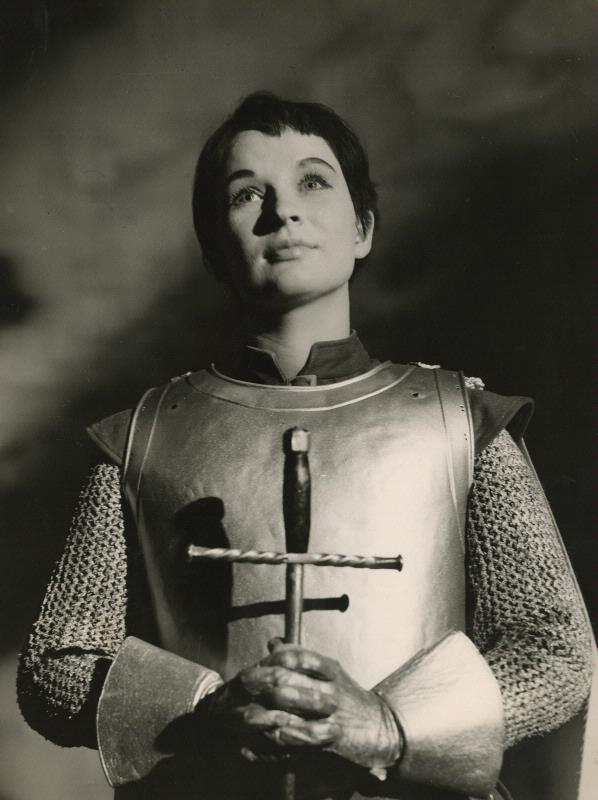
- Margreth Weivers in Saint Joan (1957)
- Born: 24 July 1926; Stockholm, Sweden
- Died: 3 February 2021 (aged 94); Stockholm, Sweden
- Occupation: Actress
- Years active: 1943–2010

Margreth Weivers (24 July 1926 – 3 February 2021) was a Swedish actress. She appeared in more than 100 films and television shows since 1943.

Weivers died in February 2021, at the age of 94.

== Selected filmography ==
- Private Bom (1948)
- A Swedish Love Story (1970)
- The Man from Majorca (1984)
- Det är långt till New York (1988)
- Lotta på Bråkmakargatan (1992)
- Spring of Joy (1993)
- Lotta flyttar hemifrån (1993)
- Glasblåsarns barn (1998)
- Jönssonligan spelar högt (2000)
- The Dog Hotel (2000)
