= Catherine Hansson =

Swedish actress

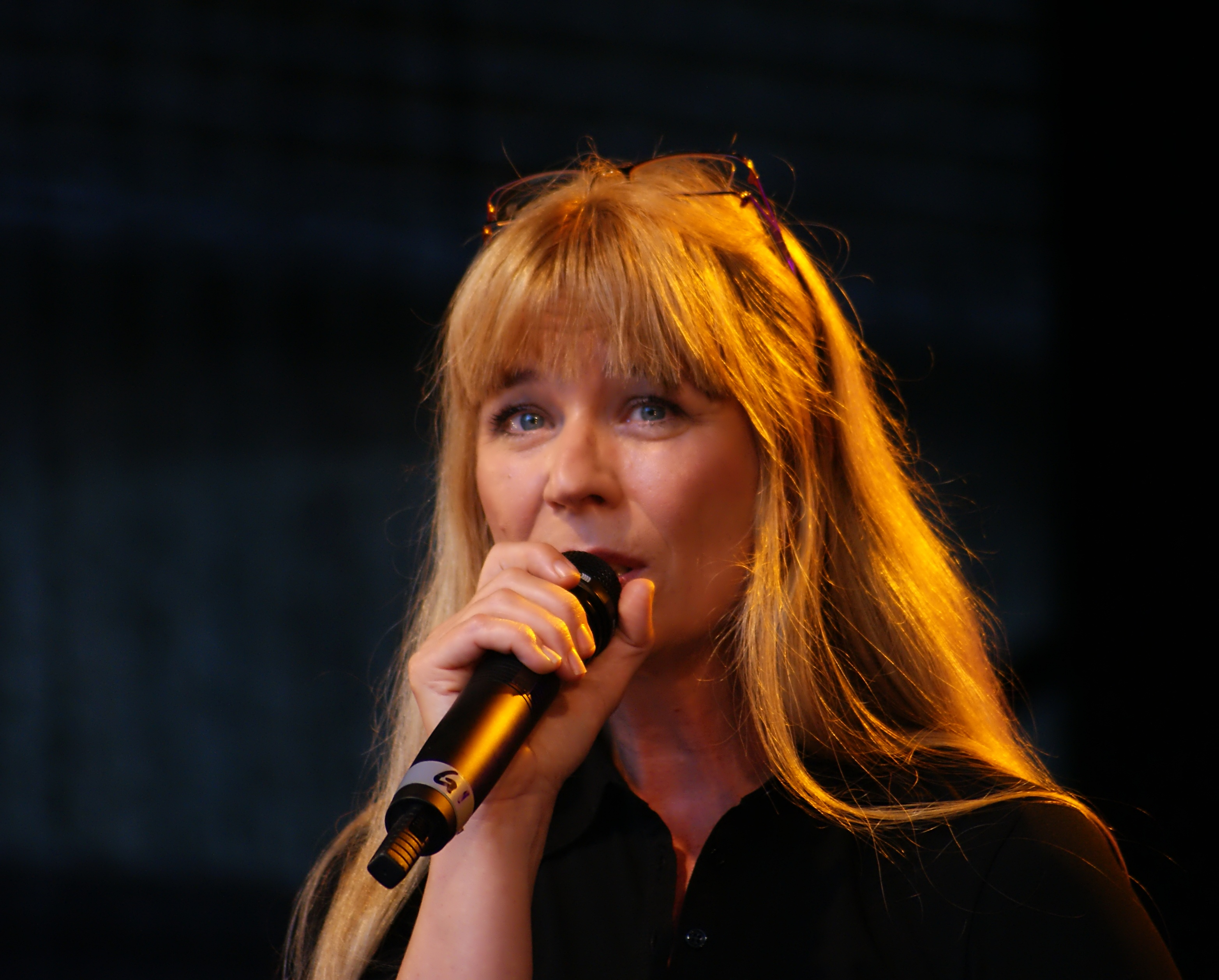
- Catherine Hansson at the Stockholm Culture Festival in August 2010.
- Born: 26 March 1958

Catherine Madeleine Hansson (born 26 March 1958, in Malmö) is a Swedish actress. She studied at Malmö Theatre Academy 1976–79.

== Selected filmography ==
- 2013 - En pilgrims död (TV)
- 2006 - Underbara älskade
- 2002 - Bella – bland kryddor och kriminella (TV)
- 2002 - Skeppsholmen (TV series)
- 2002 - Den osynlige
- 2001 - Pusselbitar (TV)
- 2001 - Festival
- 1999 - Anna Holt – polis (TV)
- 1997 - Aspiranterna (TV)
- 1996 - Kalle Blomkvist – Mästerdetektiven lever farligt
- 1994 - Tre Kronor (TV series)
- 1994 - Du bestämmer (TV)
- 1993 - Murder at the Savoy
- 1979 - Våning för 4 (TV)
