= Bill Bergson and the White Rose Rescue (1997 film) =

- Directed by: Göran Carmback
- Screenplay by: Göran Carmback
- Based on: Bill Bergson and the White Rose Rescue by Astrid Lindgren
- Produced by: Waldemar Bergendahl
- Cinematography: Carl Sundberg
- Music by: Peter and Nanne Grönvall
- Release date: 25 December 1997 (Sweden)
- Running time: 78 minutes
- Country: Sweden
- Language: Swedish

Bill Bergson and the White Rose Rescue (original Swedish title: Kalle Blomkvist och Rasmus) is a 1997 Swedish film. It is based on the novel of the same name, written in 1953 by Astrid Lindgren. A previous film had been produced in the year of the book's publication.

== About the film ==
There are several differences between the book and this film:

- At the kidnapping, it is Nicke who guards the car but in the book it is Svedberg, the fourth kidnapper, who is removed from the film.
- Anders and Kalle build a hut in the forest on the island, but in the film they live in a cave.
- The professor is locked in a room upstairs of the kidnappers' main house, but in the book he is locked in a small house.
- In the scene, when the children attack Nicke, Rasmus does not throw out Nicke's key through the window; instead he keeps it hidden in the house.
- The seaplane doesn't sink due to the float Kalle cut; instead he screws off the guy-wire of the plane so it is impossible to control it and then it crashes into a tower.
- In the film, the Rövarspråket is never used.

The theme music Vår vitaste ros is written and produced by Peter and Nanne Grönvall and sung by Sanna Nielsen.

== Cast ==
- Malte Forsberg as Kalle Blomkvist
- Josefin Årling as Eva-Lotta
- Totte Steneby as Anders
- William Svedberg as Rasmus
- Jan Mybrand as the professor, Rasmus' father
- Claes Malmberg as Björk, policeman
- Johan Stattin as Jonte, "Röda Rosen"
- Bobo Steneby as Benke
- Victor Sandberg as Sixten
- Rolf Degerlund as Peters
- Patrik Bergner as Blom
- Pierre Lindstedt as Nicke
