= Bill Bergson, Master Detective (film) =

- Directed by: Rolf Husberg
- Screenplay by: Rolf Husberg
- Based on: Bill Bergson, Master Detective by Astrid Lindgren
- Starring: Olle Johansson; Sven-Axel Carlsson; Ann-Marie Skoglund
- Cinematography: Rune Ericson
- Release date: 20 December 1947 (Sweden)
- Running time: 91 minutes
- Country: Sweden

Bill Bergson, Master Detective (original Swedish name: Mästerdetektiven Blomkvist) is a 1947 Swedish film about Bill Bergson (in Swedish as Kalle Blomkvist), directed by Rolf Husberg. It is based on the novel with the same name, written by Astrid Lindgren.

== Cast ==
- Olle Johansson as Kalle Blomkvist
- Sven-Axel Carlsson as Anders Bengtsson
- Ann-Marie Skoglund as Eva-Lotta Lisander
- Bernt Callenbo as Sixten
- Ulf Törneman-Stenhammar as Benka
- Roberto Günther as Jonte
