= Hammarby, Gävleborg =

Hammarby
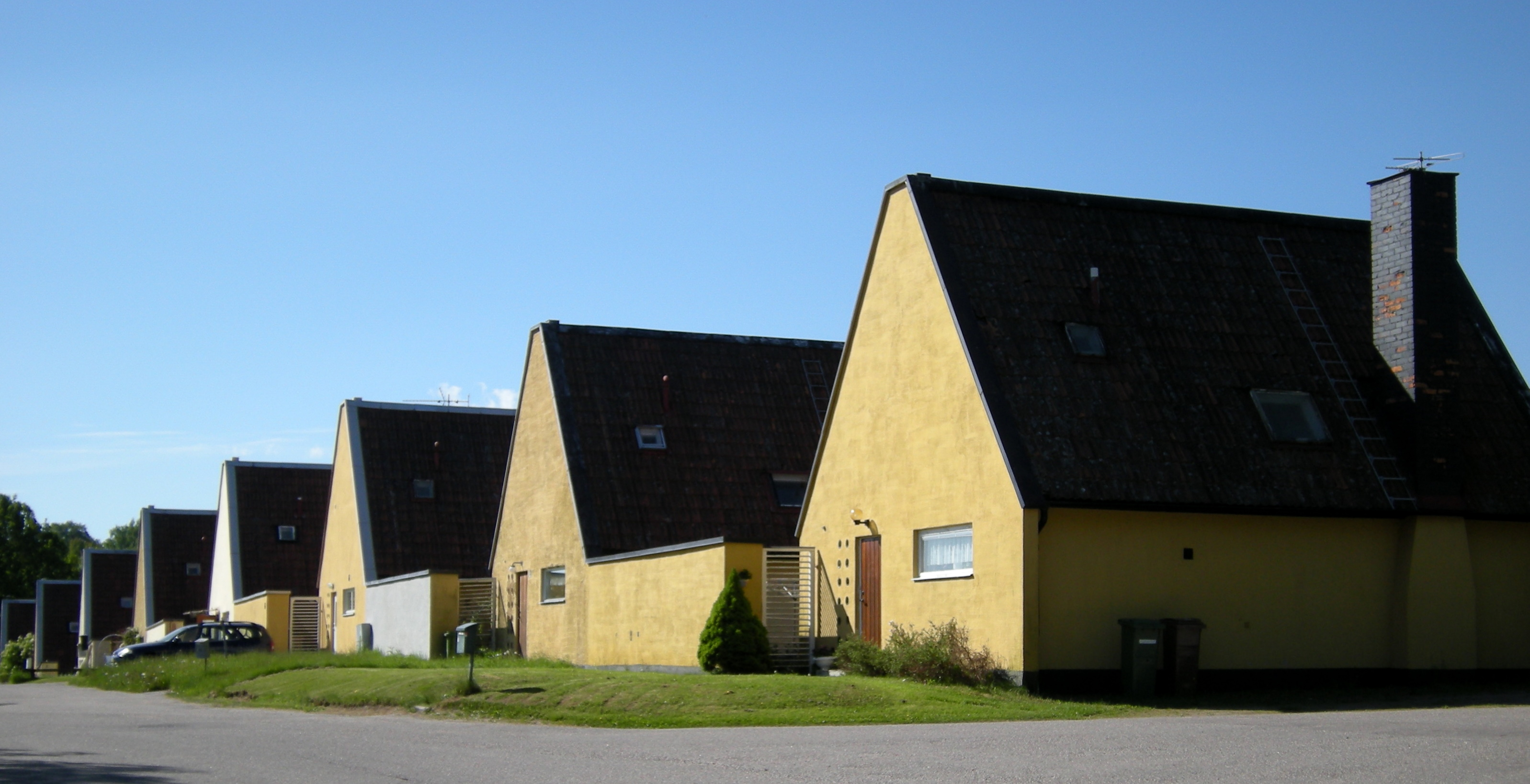
- Homes designed by Ralph Erskine in Gästrike, Hammarby, Sweden

- Location within Sweden Gävleborg Location within Sweden
- Coordinates: 60°33′N 16°34′E
- Country: Sweden
- Province: Gästrikland
- County: Gävleborg County
- Municipality: Sandviken Municipality

Area
  - Total: 1.08 km^{2} (0.42 sq mi)

Population (31 December 2010)
  - Total: 552
  - Density: 510/km^{2} (1,300/sq mi)
- Time zone: UTC+1 (CET)
  - Summer (DST): UTC+2 (CEST)

Hammarby is a locality situated in Sandviken Municipality, Gävleborg County, Sweden with 552 inhabitants in 2010.
