= Bill Bergson, Master Detective (novel) =

Book by Astrid Lindgren

- First edition
- Author: Astrid Lindgren
- Original title: Mästerdetektiven Blomkvist
- Translator: Herbert Antoine
- Illustrator: Louis Glanzman
- Language: Swedish
- Series: Bill Bergson
- Genre: Children's literature
- Publisher: Rabén & Sjögren
- Publication date: 1946
- Publication place: Sweden
- English publication date: 1952
- Media type: Print
- Pages: 200 pp
- OCLC: 186744453
- Followed by: Bill Bergson Lives Dangerously

Bill Bergson, Master Detective (original Swedish title Mästerdetektiven Blomkvist) is a children's novel by Astrid Lindgren. It is the first in the series about the Swedish boy detective, in English translation named Bill Bergson (Swedish name: Kalle Blomkvist).

== Plot summary ==
Bill Bergson investigates his friend's mysterious cousin, who is behaving suspiciously, and solves the mystery of a jewel robbery.

Bill and five of his friends also play a mock war game, with the White Roses and the Red Roses vying for possession of an unusual stone.

== Film ==
A film based on the book, Bill Bergson, Master Detective, was produced in 1947.
