= Pettson and Findus =

Book series by Sven Nordqvist

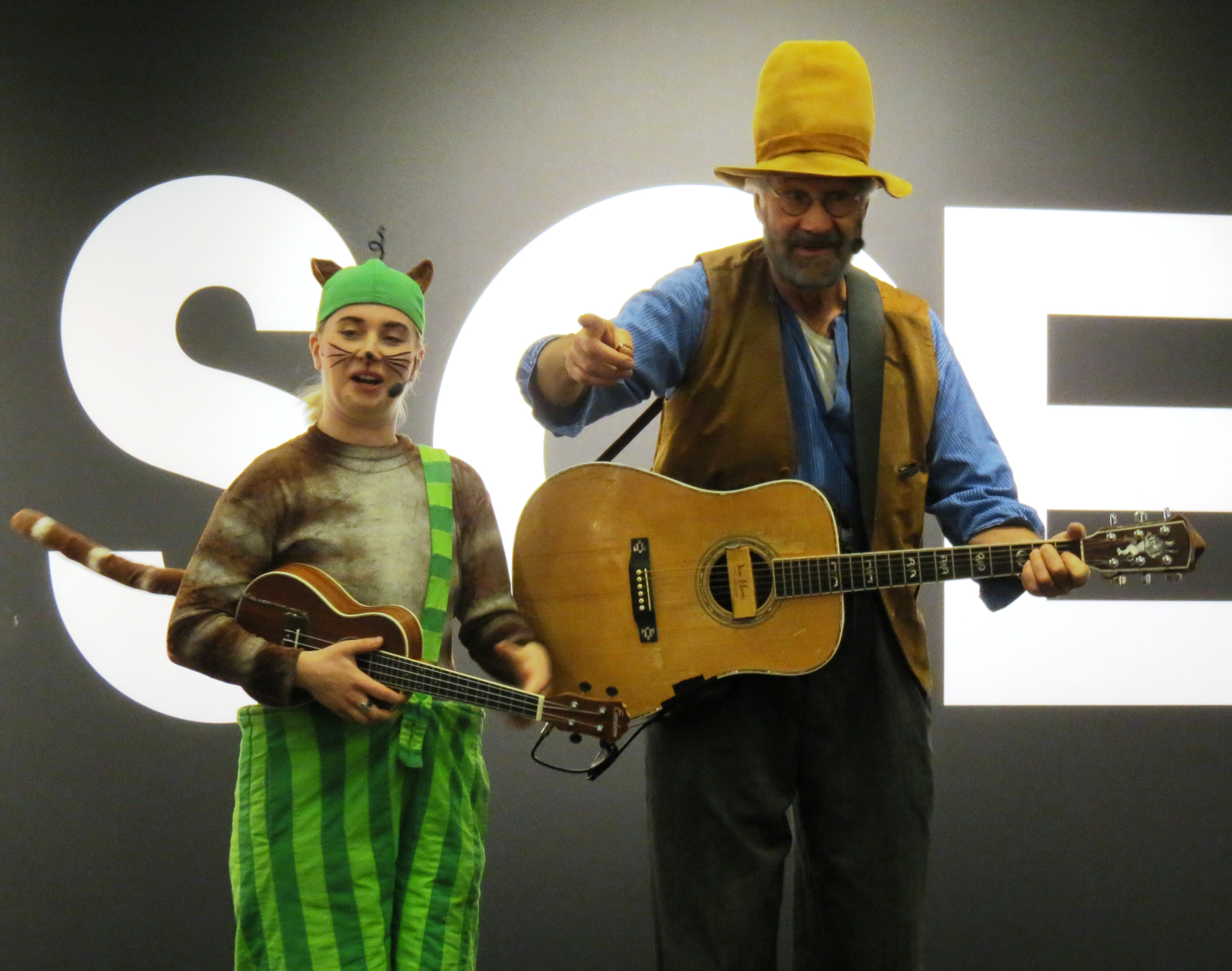
- People dressed up as Findus (left) and Pettson (right)
- Author: Sven Nordqvist
- Original title: Pettson och Findus
- Illustrator: Sven Nordqvist
- Cover artist: Sven Nordqvist
- Country: Sweden
- Language: Swedish
- Genre: children
- Published: 1984-
- Published in English: 1985-
- No. of books: 14

Pettson and Findus (Swedish: Pettson och Findus) is a series of children's books written and illustrated by Swedish author Sven Nordqvist. The books feature an old farmer (Pettson) and his cat (Findus) who live in a small ramshackle farmhouse in the countryside in around the 1950s. The first of the Pettson och Findus books to be published was Pannkakstårtan in 1984 (first published in English in 1985 as Pancake Pie).

To date, nine story books have been published in Swedish, plus a puzzle book, song book and cook book. The books have worldwide book sales of over 15 million and have been translated into 55 languages. There are two alternative English translations of the characters' names: in the books published in the UK by Hawthorn Press, as well as those published in English by Swedish publisher Opal, they have the original names, Pettson and Findus, while in the books published in the USA by Carolrhoda Books they are called Festus and Mercury.

In addition to the books, there are also three Pettson and Findus 75-minute-long animated films, an animated TV series of 26 25-minute parts, computer games and board games. In December 1993, the Swedish TV company SVT broadcast one of the Pettson and Findus stories, Tomtemaskinen (The Mechanical Santa), as its annual Sveriges Television's Christmas calendar (Christmas calendar), with one 15-minute part shown each day up until Christmas Eve. In 2000 the world of Pettson and Findus was recreated full scale at the Junibacken Children's Museum in Stockholm.

== The setting for the stories ==
Pettson is an old farmer who lives in a ramshackle falu red-painted wooden farmhouse in the Swedish countryside. He is presumably a widower, as in Pettson Goes Camping he tells of a planned camping trip with his wife in his youth, but no children are mentioned. His neighbours regard him as a bit odd, but he does have the company of a cat, Findus. Findus is dressed in a green-striped costume and wears a cap. Pettson and Findus can converse with each other, and the cat can stand up on his two hind legs like a human - Findus thus appears and behaves as if he were a small child. However, Findus, unlike Pettson, is aware of other "small creatures" (called muckles) living in the house, who play havoc with Pettson's belongings. Each of the books takes off from simple events, such as gardening, going fishing, preparing for Christmas, and so on. It emerges in one of the later books, When Findus was little and disappeared, that the cat had been given to Pettson as a kitten, and that he had arrived in a cardboard box with the text "Findus Fresh Peas" on the side - hence the inspiration for the choice of a name.

== The Pettson and Findus books ==
1. Pancakes for Findus / a.k.a. Pancake Pie (2007) / a.k.a. The Birthday Cake (NorthSouth Books, 2015) (original: Pannkakstårtan, 1985)
2. Findus and the Fox / a.k.a. The Fox Hunt (2009) / a.k.a. The Fox Chase (NorthSouth Books, 2015) (original: Rävjakten, 1986)
3. Findus at Christmas / a.k.a. Merry Christmas Festus and Mercury (2011) (original: Pettson får julbesök, 1989)
4. Findus Plants Meatballs / a.k.a. A Rumpus in the Garden / a.k.a. Festus and Mercury: Ruckus in the Garden (2013) / a.k.a. A Ruckus in the Garden (NorthSouth Books, 2018) (original: Kackel i grönsakslandet, 1990)
5. Findus Goes Fishing / a.k.a. Festus and Mercury: Wishing to go Fishing (2016) (original: Stackars Pettson, 1991)
6. Findus Goes Camping / a.k.a. Pettson Goes Camping / a.k.a. Festus and Mercury Go Camping (2010) / a.k.a. The Camping Trip (NorthSouth Books, 2017) (original: Pettson tältar, 1992)
7. The Mechanical Santa (Tomtemaskinen, 1994)
8. The Rooster's Minute (Tuppens minut, 1996)
9. When Findus was Little and Disappeared (2008) / a.k.a. Findus Disappears! (NorthSouth Books, 2014) (original: När Findus var liten och försvann, 2001)
10. Findus Moves Out (2012) (original: Findus flyttar ut, 2012)
11. Findus, Food and Fun / a.k.a. Puzzle with Findus (2014) (original: Pyssla med Findus)
12. Pettson and Findus Song book (original: Pettson och Findus sångbok)
13. Pettson and Findus cookbook (original: Pettson och Findus kokbok)
14. Keeping Up With Findus (2019) (original: Kan du ingenting, Pettson?, 2019)

== The Pettson and Findus films ==
- Pettson & Findus – The cat and the old man years (Pettson och Findus – Katten och gubbens år), 1999.
- Pettson och Findus – Kattonauten (Pettson och Findus – Kattonauten), 2000.
- Pettson & Findus – Pettson's Promise (Pettson och Findus – Tomtemaskinen), 2005
- Pettson & Findus – Forget-Abilities (Pettson och Findus – Glömligheter), 2009.
- Pettson & Findus: Fun Stuff (Pettson och Findus - Roligheter), 2014.
- Pettson och Findus - Juligheter, 2016.
- Pettson och Findus - Findus flyttar hemifrån, 2018.
- Pettson och Findus - Mucklorna och hur de kom till, 2022.

== The Pettson and Findus farm ==
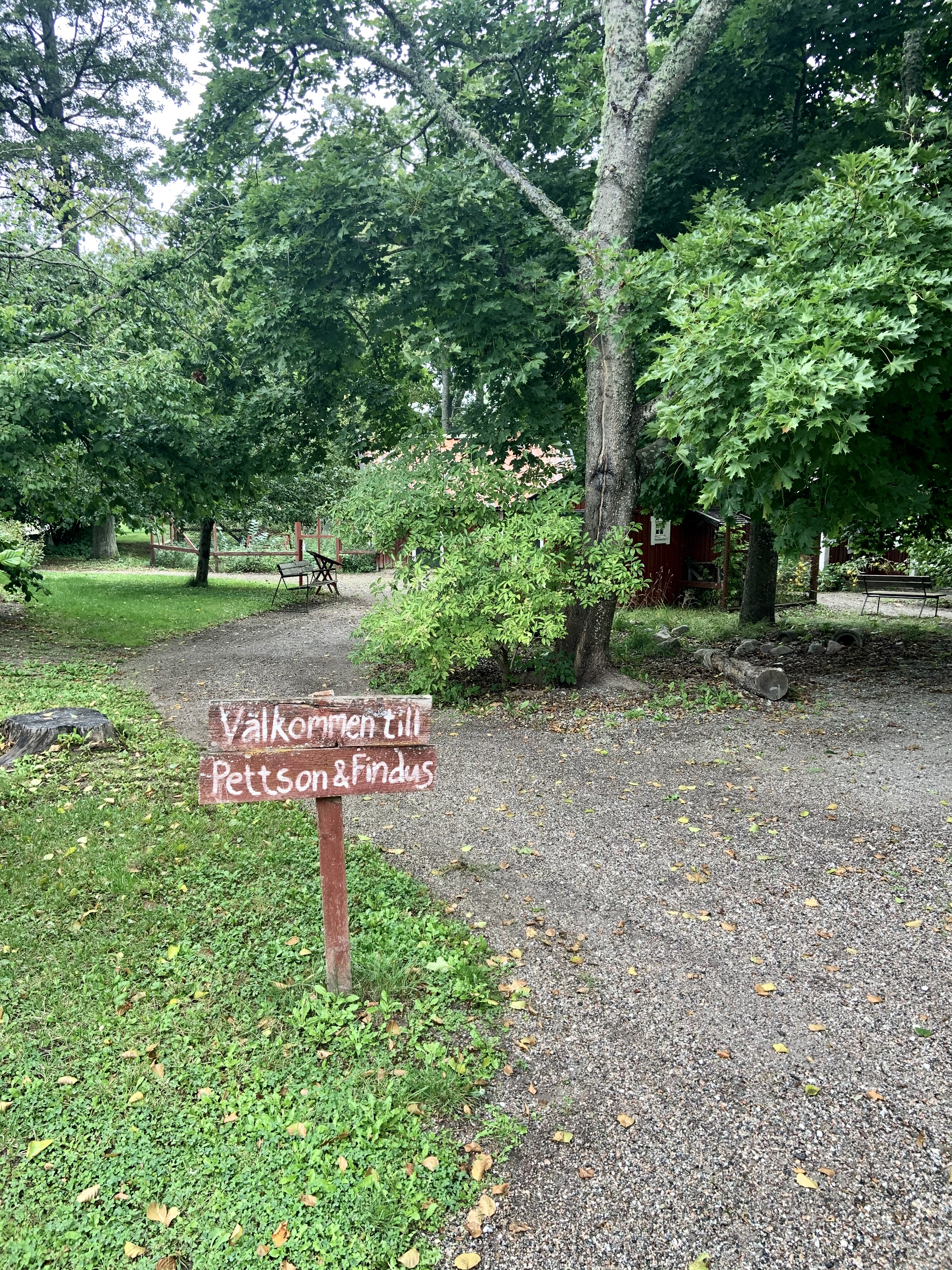
A sign leading the Pettson and Findus farm

On the premises of Julita manor, Sven Nordqvist helped build a farm designed after the books. The author himself has created some of furniture and interior. Everything on the farm has been designed in a 2:3 scale, adapted to the size of the children.

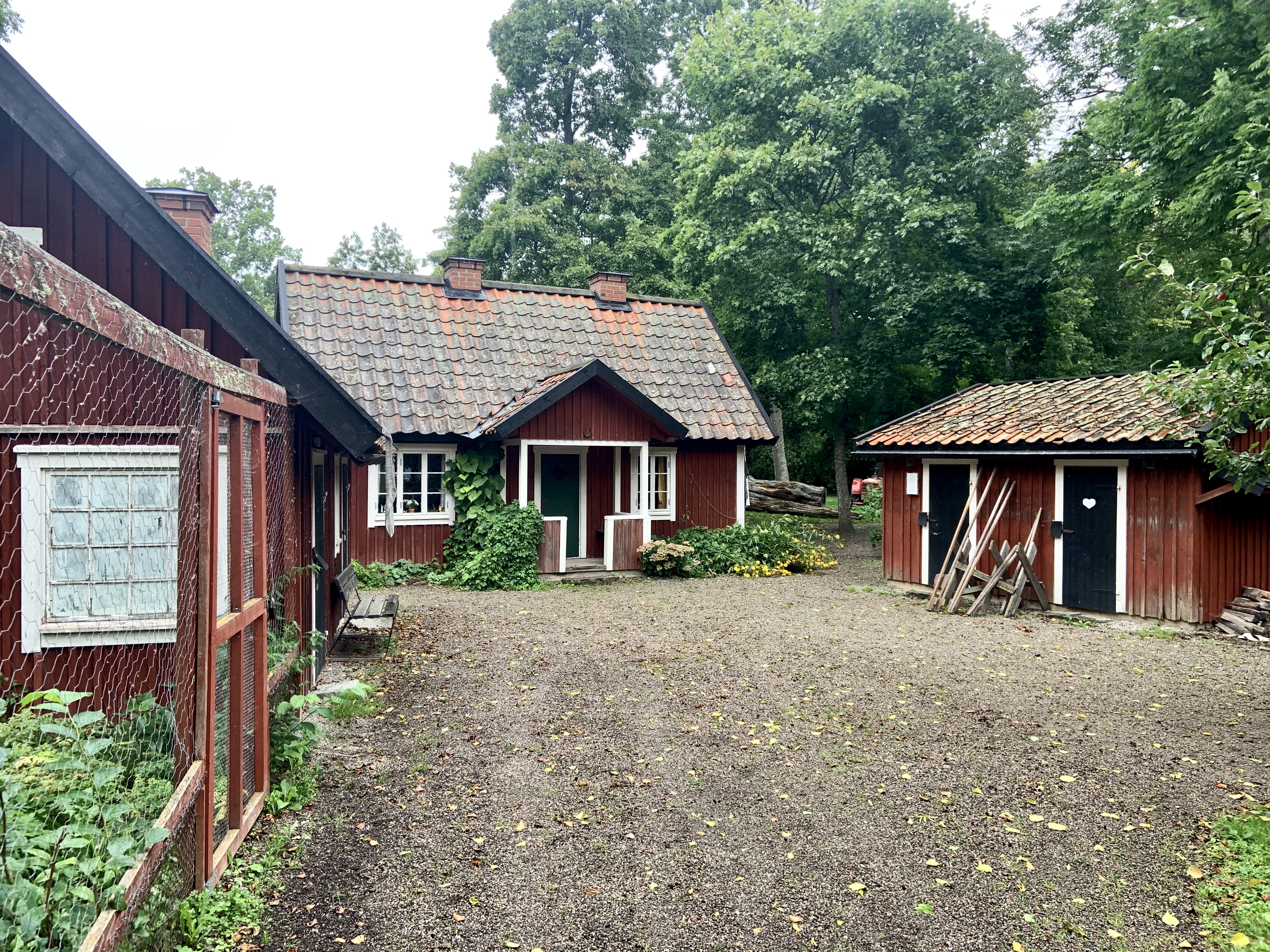
Pettson and Findus' farm at Julita manor

== TV series ==
A TV series, also titled Pettson and Findus, aired on KiKA in 2000. The series was written by Sven Nordqvist, music by Naima and was produced by TV-Loonland AG and ZDF.
