= David Olsson =

Swedish footballer

Personal information
- Full name: Nils David Olsson
- Date of birth: 27 June 1997 (age 29)
- Height: 1.97 m (6 ft 6 in)
- Position: Goalkeeper

Team information
- Current team: Dalstorps IF
- Number: 30

Youth career
- IF Elfsborg

Senior career*
Years	Team	Apps	(Gls)
2016–2020	IF Elfsborg	2	(0)
2019	→ IK Oddevold (loan)	19	(0)
2020	→ Örgryte IS (loan)	0	(0)
2021–2022	Lindome GIF	57	(0)
2023–2024	Varbergs BoIS	19	(0)
2025–	Varbergs BoIS	6	(0)
- * Club domestic league appearances and goals as of 20:18, 11 May 2025 (UTC)

David Olsson (born 27 June 1997) is a Swedish footballer who plays as a goalkeeper for Varbergs BoIS in the Allsvenskan.

Olsson grew up in Borås, approximately 100 metres from Borås Arena and supported the club IF Elfsborg. Olsson played youth football in the same club and was drafted into the senior squad in 2016. He made his Allsvenskan debut against Kalmar in 2017, after Kevin Stuhr Ellegaard had been sent off during a cup match.

Following loans to IK Oddevold and Örgryte IS, Olsson left Elfsborg for Lindome GIF in the Ettan ahead of the 2021 season. While playing in the third tier, Olsson commenced education as a construction engineer. However, after two seasons of regular play at Lindome, he was brought back to the highest tier by Varbergs BoIS. He made his debut for Varberg in April 2023 against Sirius.

Olsson had previously went on trial at Varberg in the winter of 2019.
