= Claes Malmberg =

Swedish actor

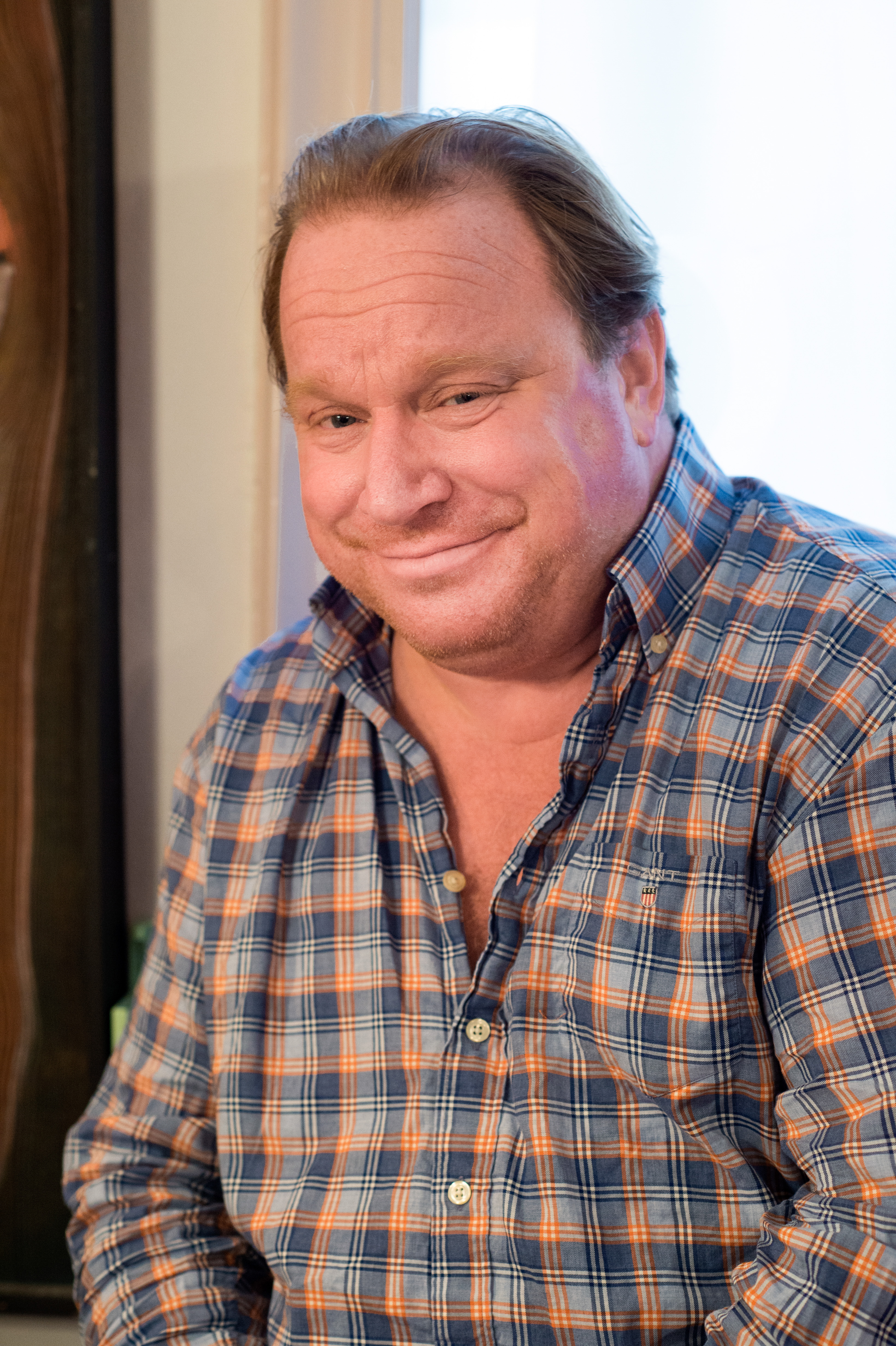
- Malmberg in 2014.
- Born: Clas-Peder Malmberg; 8 April 1961 (age 65); Gothenburg, Sweden
- Occupations: Actor, comedian
- Years active: 1990–present
- Spouse(s): Caroline Brunell (m. 1991–1996) Fatima Rainey (?-2015)
- Children: 5

Claes Malmberg (real name Clas-Peder Malmberg, born 8 April 1961 in Gothenburg, Sweden) is a Swedish actor and stand-up comedian. He has worked together with Anders Aldgård. He has appeared in theatre plays and in films and TV series.

== Career ==
Malmberg was first famous as the figure Ronny Jönsson. After that he became a stand-up comedian, together with Lennie Norman. Together they were hosts of the TV program Måndagsklubben. He has appeared in Parlamentet, Så ska det låta, Doobidoo, Sing-A-Long and Pratmakarna, and on stage at Gunnebo House. In 2017 he participated in Bäst i test. In 2018, he participated in Let's Dance on TV4.

== Selected filmography ==
- 2021 - Dancing Queens (film)
- 2011 - Hur många lingon finns det i världen?
- 2010 - Saltön (TV)
- 2009 - Vem tror du att du är? (TV)
- 2009 - Guds tre flickor
- 2008 - Rallybrudar
- 2005/2006 - Hon och Hannes
- 1998 - När karusellerna sover (TV)
- 1997–99 - Pappas flicka (TV)
- 1997 - Kalle Blomkvist och Rasmus
- 1996 - Kalle Blomkvist – Mästerdetektiven lever farligt
- 1993 - Pariserhjulet
- 1992 - Kusiner i kubik (TV)
- 1992–93 - Lotta på Bråkmakargatan
- 1991 - Sunes jul (TV)
- 1991 - "Harry Lund" lägger näsan i blöt!
