= Björn Isfält =

Swedish composer (1942–1997)

- Born: 28 June 1942; Linköping, Sweden
- Died: 17 January 1997 (aged 54); Stockholm, Sweden
- Occupation: Composer
- Years active: 1970-1995

Björn Isfält (28 June 1942 – 17 January 1997) was a Swedish composer. At the 25th Guldbagge Awards he won the Creative Achievement award. He composed music for more than 35 films and television shows between 1970 and 1995.

== Selected filmography ==
- A Swedish Love Story (1970)
- Giliap (1975)
- The Brothers Lionheart (1977)
- Göta kanal eller Vem drog ur proppen? (1981)
- Rasmus på luffen (1981)
- Killing Heat (1981)
- Ronia, the Robber's Daughter (1984)
- My Life as a Dog (1985)
- Allra käraste syster (1988)
- Ingen rövare finns i skogen (1988)
- The Journey to Melonia (1989)
- World of Glory (1991)
- What's Eating Gilbert Grape (1993)
