= Lotta på Bråkmakargatan =

- Directed by: Johanna Hald
- Written by: Astrid Lindgren (novel); Johanna Hald (screenplay)
- Produced by: Waldemar Bergendahl
- Starring: Grete Havnesköld; Linn Gloppestad; Martin Andersson; Beatrice Järås; Claes Malmberg
- Distributed by: AB Svensk Filmindustri
- Release date: 26 September 1992 (Sweden)
- Running time: 74 minutes
- Country: Sweden
- Language: Swedish
- Budget: 15,000,000 SEK

Lotta på Bråkmakargatan is a Swedish film which was released to cinemas in Sweden on 26 September 1992, based on the books by Astrid Lindgren, directed by Johanna Hald. It was followed by Lotta flyttar hemifrån.

== Cast ==
- Grete Havnesköld as Lotta
- Linn Gloppestad as Mia
- Martin Andersson as Jonas
- Beatrice Järås as Doris (Lotta's mother)
- Claes Malmberg as Stephen (Lotta's father)
- Margreth Weivers as Mrs. Berg
- Ulla Lopez as Baker's wife
- Klas Dykhoff as Chimney sweep
- Rune Turesson as Lotta's grandfather
- Else-Marie Sundin as Lotta's grandmother
- Alice Braun as Majken
- Anna Nyman as Woman
- Claes Månsson as Conductor
