= Grete Havnesköld =

Swedish actress

Grete Sofia Havnesköld (born 10 March 1986) is a Swedish actress, most known for her role as Lotta in Lotta på Bråkmakargatan and Saga in Frostbite.

== Selected filmography ==
- 1992–93 – Lotta på Bråkmakargatan
- 1997 – Selma & Johanna – en roadmovie
- 2006 – Frostbite
- 2010 – Prinsessa
- 2010 – Wallander – Dödsängeln
