= Bill Bergson and the White Rose Rescue (1953 film) =

1953 film by Rolf Husberg

- Directed by: Rolf Husberg
- Screenplay by: Rolf Husberg
- Based on: Bill Bergson and the White Rose Rescue by Astrid Lindgren
- Produced by: Olle Nordemar
- Release date: 16 November 1953 (Sweden)
- Running time: 89 minutes
- Country: Sweden
- Language: Swedish

Bill Bergson and the White Rose Rescue (original Swedish title: Mästerdetektiven och Rasmus) is a 1953 Swedish film. It is based on the novel with the same name, written by Astrid Lindgren.

== About the film ==
The film had premiere at the cinema Olympia in Stockholm on 16 November 1953. The film was recorded at Bogesund (Vaxholm), Sala and in studio in Stockholm.

There are differences between the book and this film:

- "Vita Rosen" (Kalle, Anders and Eva-Lotta) see the kidnapping after "waring" to "Röda Rosen" but here they see it from a hut where they slept.
- In the book, Nicke is not arrested, and "Röda Rosen" (Sixten, Benka and Jonte) don't make birds by the document papers.
- When the kidnappers are escaping with the floatplane, Kalle cuts one of the plane's floats, but here he instead uses a rope tying the plane on a boat where policeman Björk sits and then the plane can't go upwards.

== Cast ==
- Lars-Erik Lundberg as Kalle Blomkvist
- Inger Axö as Eva-Lotta
- Peder Dam as Anders
- Eskil Dalenius as Rasmus
- Björn Berglund as the professor, Rasmus' father
- Sigge Fürst as policeman Björk
- Ulf Johanson as Engineer Peters, chief of the kidnapper-group
- Gustaf Hiort af Ornäs as Berggren, kidnapper
- Birger Åsander as Blom, kidnapper
- Elof Ahrle as Nicke, kidnapper
- Arne Källerud as Kalle Blomkvist's father
- Solveig Hedengran as Kalle Blomkvist's mother
- Britta Brunius as Eva-Lotta's mother
- Börje Mellvig as disponent Stenberg
