= Johanna Hald =

Swedish film director, photographer and screenwriter

- Born: 20 July 1945 (age 81)
- Died: September 13, 2025 (aged 80)
- Occupation: Film director

Brita Margareta Johanna Hald (born 20 July 1945 in Stockholm) was a Swedish director, photographer and screenwriter.

== Selected filmography ==
- 1986 – Love Me! (screenwriter)
- 1990 – Black Jack (screenwriter)
- 1990 – Pelle flyttar till Komfusenbo (screenwriter and director)
- 1992–93 – Lotta på Bråkmakargatan (director and screenwriter)
- 1996 – Kalle Blomkvist – Mästerdetektiven lever farligt (screenwriter)
- 1998 – Under solen (screenwriter)
- 2001 – Sprängaren (screenwriter)
- 2003 – Paradiset (screenwriter)
