= Bill Bergson Lives Dangerously =

Book by Astrid Lindgren

- First edition
- Author: Astrid Lindgren
- Original title: Mästerdetektiven Blomkvist lever farligt
- Language: Swedish
- Genre: Children's literature
- Publisher: Rabén & Sjögren
- Publication date: 1951
- Publication place: Sweden
- Preceded by: Bill Bergson, Master Detective
- Followed by: Bill Bergson and the White Rose Rescue

Bill Bergson Lives Dangerously (original Swedish title: Mästerdetektiven Blomkvist lever farligt) is a 1951 Swedish novel written by Astrid Lindgren. It is the second book about the master detective Bill Bergson (in Swedish as Kalle Blomkvist). In this book the Rövarspråket ("Robber Language") appears for the first time and is very popular until present. According to the book, Eva-Lotta's father Master Baker told her when he and his friends spoke Rövarspråket as boys.

== Synopsis ==
A year has passed since the adventure with Uncle Einar and the jewel thieves last summer. It is summer again and the "war" between Röda Rosen and Vita Rosen continues. When "Vita Rosen" (Kalle, Anders and Eva-Lotta) pass the old man Gren on the bridge over the river, Eva-Lotta says that Gren is a usurer. They run to Prärien (The Prairie), a place at the outside of their city Lillköping where the mansion from the 18th century is, and "Röda Rosen" have made it to their headquarters. During the "war" they kidnap Anders and lock Kalle and Eva-Lotta in.

"Röda Rosen" (Sixten, Benka and Jonte) have a "hearing" with Anders in Jonte's room. In the house, which is in front of Jonte's house, Gren lives there. Kalle and Eva-Lotta, who have escaped, climb onto the roof and see what they are doing with Anders. On the way up, Eva-Lotta sees a man in green gabardine trousers who is visiting Gren and hears that they will "meet on Wednesday at the regular place" and Gren will bring all the promissory notes.

"Röda Rosen" force Anders to tell them where Stormumriken is hidden but Anders escapes. When Eva-Lotta is ordered to go to the mansion and get Stormumriken, she sees Gren and the man with the green gabardine trousers. When the man in the trousers is going away, she runs into him and then he drops a paper, a promissory note, which she takes. Later she finds Gren dead and runs home scared. The police block the area at the mansion. They have a hearing with Eva-Lotta who tells them what she did and that she saw Gren's murderer. They realize that his name is written on the promissory note, but she doesn't remember what she did with it.

All newspapers publish about the murder and one foolishly publishes Eva-Lotta's name. People send candy and chocolate to her. Vita Rosen team eats too much of this candy and decides to split one chocolate bar and take it with. Anders gets a mission to hide Stormumriken in an Earth globe in Sixten's room. Sixten's dog Beppo barks happily at Anders, but he makes him quiet; he gives him Eva-Lotta's chocolate bar he was saving for later.

The next day Beppo, and even Anders, who licked chocolate off his fingers, are sick. Kalle believes that the chocolate must have been poisoned; he does a Marsh test and discovers that the chocolate was poisoned with arsenic and understands that it must have been sent by the killer. When Kalle and Anders tell it to the police, it doesn't help, as Eva-Lotta has thrown away the letter.

A few days later, "Vita Rosen" are on "treasure hunt", as they search after a map at the mansion which "Röda Rosen" have hidden there. When Kalle and Anders go and look at the murder place, the killer, who changed his appearance, comes into the house where Eva-Lotta is alone. She doesn't recognize him and tells him that they are looking for a paper, making him afraid that they may have found the promissory note. When Eva-Lotta sees a tattoo on his hand, she recognizes him and tells Kalle and Anders in Rövarspråket that he is the murderer. Using a revolver, he forces all of them to get the paper and show it. When he takes it and reads it, they attack him, throw the revolver out through the window and lock him in. He jumps, finds the revolver and wants to finish the process with them, but runs away when the police come. He runs to his car, but the tires are cut. He throws the revolver in a tarn before the police capture him. He denies everything, until the proofs come; Benka, who collects stamps, has the chocolate-letter and finally Eva-Lotta finds the promissory note in her pocket, and he confesses.

== Films ==
There are two films, produced in 1957 and 1996, based on the book.
