= Sven Nordqvist =

Swedish children's book writer and illustrator

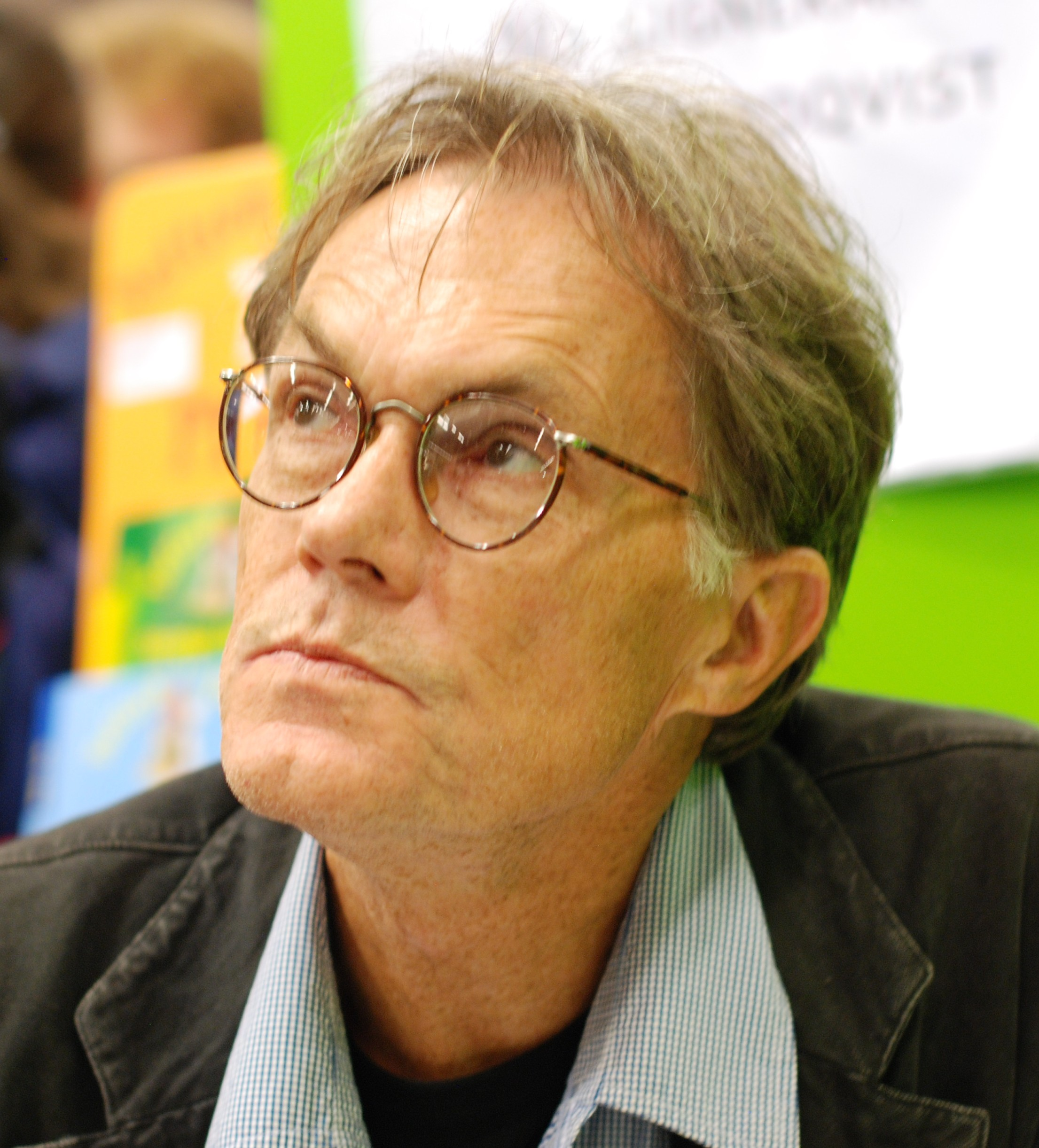
- Sven Nordqvist at the Gothenburg Book Fair 2010.
- Born: 30 April 1946 (age 80); Helsingborg, Sweden
- Education: Lund Institute of Technology
- Occupations: writer, illustrator
- Writing career
- Language: Swedish
- Period: 1982–

Sven Otto Rickard Nordqvist (born 30 April 1946) is a Swedish writer and illustrator of children's books, best known for his series Pettson and Findus, about the old farmer Pettson and his talented cat Findus. He is also active as a comic artist.

== Background ==
Nordqvist was born in Helsingborg and grew up in Halmstad, Sweden. He originally wanted to be an illustrator but was rejected by several art schools. Instead he studied architecture at Lund Institute of Technology, and worked for a time there as a lecturer in architecture. At the same time he continued to look for work as an illustrator working on advertisements, posters and picture books. In 1983 he won first prize in a children's book competition and since then has worked exclusively as an author and illustrator of children's books.

He is married and has two adult sons.

During his career, he has been given awards in both Sweden and Germany. His Pettson and Findus books are especially popular in Germany, where the characters are known as Pettersson and Findus. In Danish they are called Peddersen and Findus. In Norwegian they are called Pettersen and Findus. In Finnish they are called Pesonen and Viiru. And in English, Festus and Mercury, though English translations of the books exist with the original names kept. Pettson and Findus was adapted for television in 1999.

In 2007 he won the literary award Augustpriset in the children's books category, for his book Var är min syster? ("Where is my sister?"). In 1992 he won the Deutscher Jugendliteraturpreis.
