= Lotta on Troublemaker Street =

Children's book by Astrid Lindgren

- The Children on Troublemaker Street (1964); Lotta on Troublemaker Street (1964); Lotta's Bike (1972); Lotta's Christmas Surprise (1978); Lotta's Easter Surprise (1991)
- Author: Astrid Lindgren
- Illustrator: Ilon Wikland
- Cover artist: Ilon Wikland
- Country: Sweden
- Language: Swedish
- Genre: Children
- Publisher: Rabén & Sjögren (Sweden); Macmillan (UK); Aladdin Paperbacks (US)
- Published: 1956 – 1990
- Published in English: 1964 – 1991
- Media type: Print (hardback & paperback)
- No. of books: 5

Lotta on Troublemaker Street (Swedish: Lotta på Bråkmakargatan; also known as The Children on Troublemaker Street) is a Swedish novel and picture book series by Rabén & Sjögren, which is written by Astrid Lindgren.

== Plot ==
Lotta is a little girl who is three years old at the beginning of the book series. She lives with her siblings Jonas and Mia Maria and her parents on Troublemaker Street. Lotta's next-door neighbor is an elderly woman who Lotta simply calls Aunt Berg. Lotta often visits her. One day, when Lotta has an argument with her mother because she does not want to wear her scratchy sweater, she even moves into Aunt Berg's attic. She later feels lonely in the attic, so she decides to come back home with her father, when he visits her. Lotta often plays with her siblings Mia Maria and Jonas, but does not always want to follow their rules, so the games often end abruptly.

== Background ==
The stories about Lotta take place in the late 1950s. The illustrations were made by Ilon Wikland. The role model for her illustrations of Lotta was her own daughter Anna.

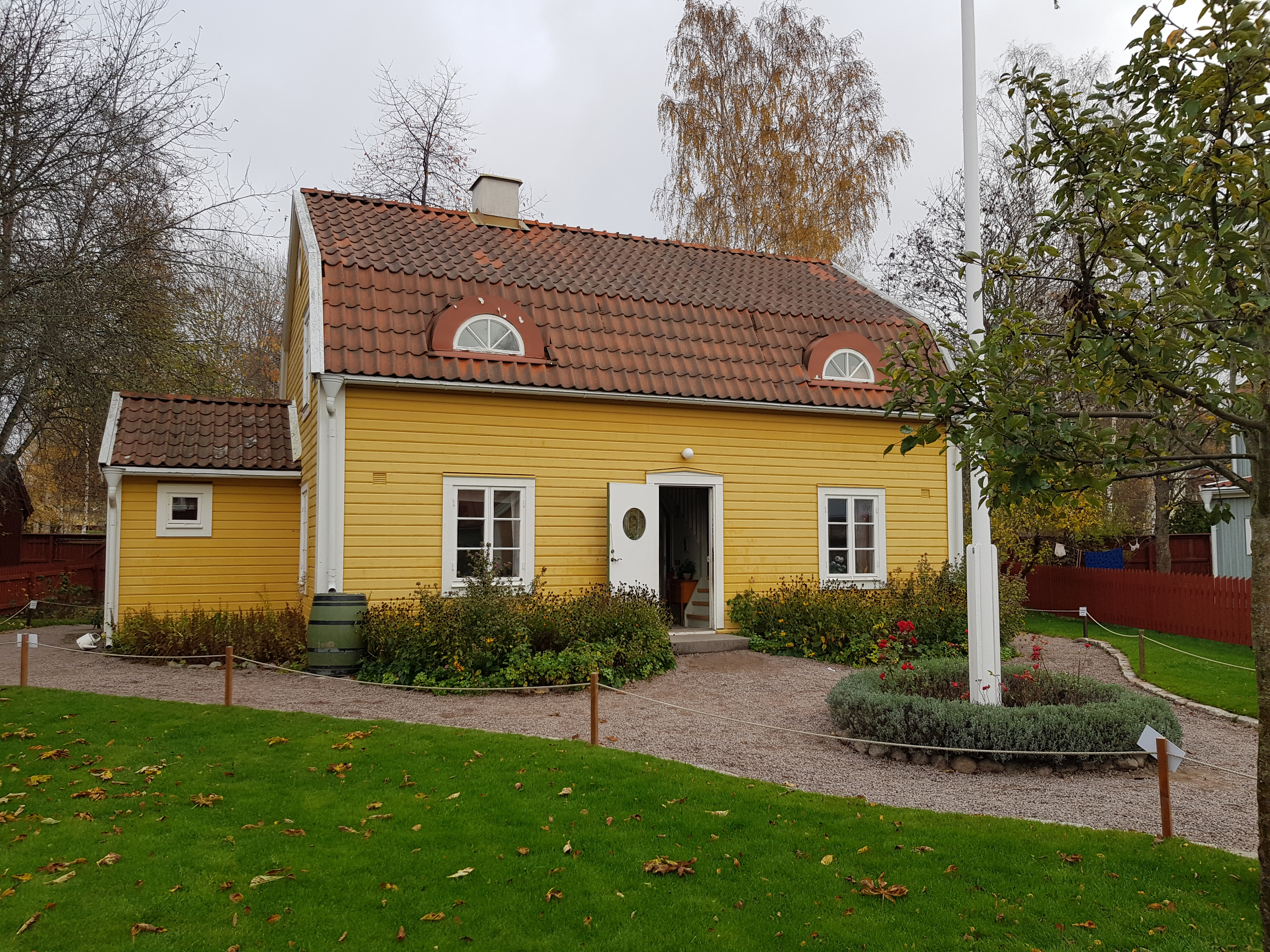
Lotta's house in the theme park Astrid Lindgren's World

In the theme park Astrid Lindgren's World, some locations of the books can be visited.

== Characters ==
Figure	Description
Lotta	Lotta is a three to five-year-old girl who does a lot of nonsense and is very stubborn.
Mia Maria	Mia Maria is Lotta's big sister. Many of the stories are narrated by her.
Jonas	Jonas is Lotta and Mia Maria's older brother, who plays a lot with Mia Maria.
Otto "Totte"	Totte is Lotta's cousin of the same age. Lotta enjoys teasing and hitting him because she says he is "so cute when he cries".
Stefan	Stefan is Lotta's dad, whom she adores.
Doris	Doris is Lotta's mother, who often has to take action when Lotta has done something wrong.
Aunt Berg	Aunt Berg is the friendly neighbor of Lotta and her family
Scotty	Scotty is Aunt Berg's dog.
Teddy	Teddy is Lotta's big pink stuffed pig, which she takes everywhere.
Anna Klara	Anna-Klara is the cousin of Lotta and her siblings. She is strong and adventurous.
Maiken	Maiken is the maid of Lotta's grandparents.

== Works ==
Title (individual novel)	Alternative titles	Original title	Original release	English release	Notes
The Children on Troublemaker Street	Lotta, Lotta Says No!, Mischievous Martens	Barnen på Bråkmakargatan	1956	1964	Novel
Lotta on Troublemaker Street	Lotta Leaves Home, Lotta Makes a Mess	Lotta på Bråkmakargatan	1961	1964	Novel
Lotta's Christmas Surprise	Of Course Polly Can Do Almost Anything	Visst kan Lotta nästan allting	1965	1978	Picture book
Lotta's Bike	Of Course Polly Can Ride a Bike	Visst kan Lotta cykla	1971	1972	Picture book
Lotta's Easter Surprise	–	Visst är Lotta en glad unge	1990	1991	Picture book

== Films about The Children on Troublemaker Street ==
Year	Title	Director	Country	References
1992	Lotta på Bråkmakargatan	Johanna Hald	Sweden	
1993	Lotta flyttar hemifrån	Johanna Hald	Sweden	

In the early 1990s two films were made about the life of Lotta and her siblings.

The script was written by Johanna Hald and Astrid Lindgren. Astrid Lindgren had a major influence on the script for the films, but she was not present during the filming. The leading actress Grete Havnesköld was chosen by the director Johanna Hald. Hald had originally intended to make a film about Lindgren's picture book The Day Adam Got Mad. She had already written the script for it, but Lindgren did not think the script was good enough and turned it down. In return, Hald was allowed to shoot the films about Lotta.

== Reception ==
Maria Hunstig of the Vogue magazine described Lotta as her heroine. She praised Lotta's healthy self-confidence and her 'I can do anything' attitude, which makes Lotta far ahead of the common image of girls of the late 1950s. She also stated that Lotta still works as a clever role model today.

Christina Steinlein from Focus praised the picture book Lotta's Bike. She believed that the story is told with a lot of humor, is illustrated in a wonderfully non-teaching way and belongs on the children's bookshelf.

Ingrid Löbner advised parents in her guidebook Gelassene Eltern-Glückliche Kinder: Mit mehr Leichtigkeit und Entspanntheit durch die ersten sechs Lebensjahre to look at Astrid Lindgren's picture book Lotta's Christmas Surprise in order to be able to empathize with how four-year-old children feel, how they see the world, what thoughts they have and what activities they are already capable of. Gabriele Cromme added that the picture book contradicts the traditional understanding of the roles of girls and boys. Boys are perceived as "active and adventurous" and girls as "passive and immobile", but Lotta is "active and adventurous".
