= Ronja, the Robber's Daughter =

Swedish children's book

Ronia, the Robber's Daughter
- First edition
- Author: Astrid Lindgren
- Original title: Ronja rövardotter
- Illustrator: Ilon Wikland; Trina Schart Hyman (1983)
- Cover artist: Trina Schart Hyman (1983)
- Language: Swedish
- Publisher: Rabén & Sjögren
- Publication date: 1981
- Publication place: Sweden
- Pages: 235 pp
- ISBN: 91-29-54877-2
- OCLC: 9462379
- LC Class: MLCS 82/9917

Ronia, the Robber's Daughter (Swedish: Ronja rövardotter) is a children's fantasy book by the Swedish author Astrid Lindgren, first published in 1981, and illustrated by Trina Schart Hyman in 1983.

The book has been translated into at least 39 languages. It was adapted as a film in 1984, a Danish and a German musical, the Japanese anime, and a live-action television adaptation.

== Plot summary ==
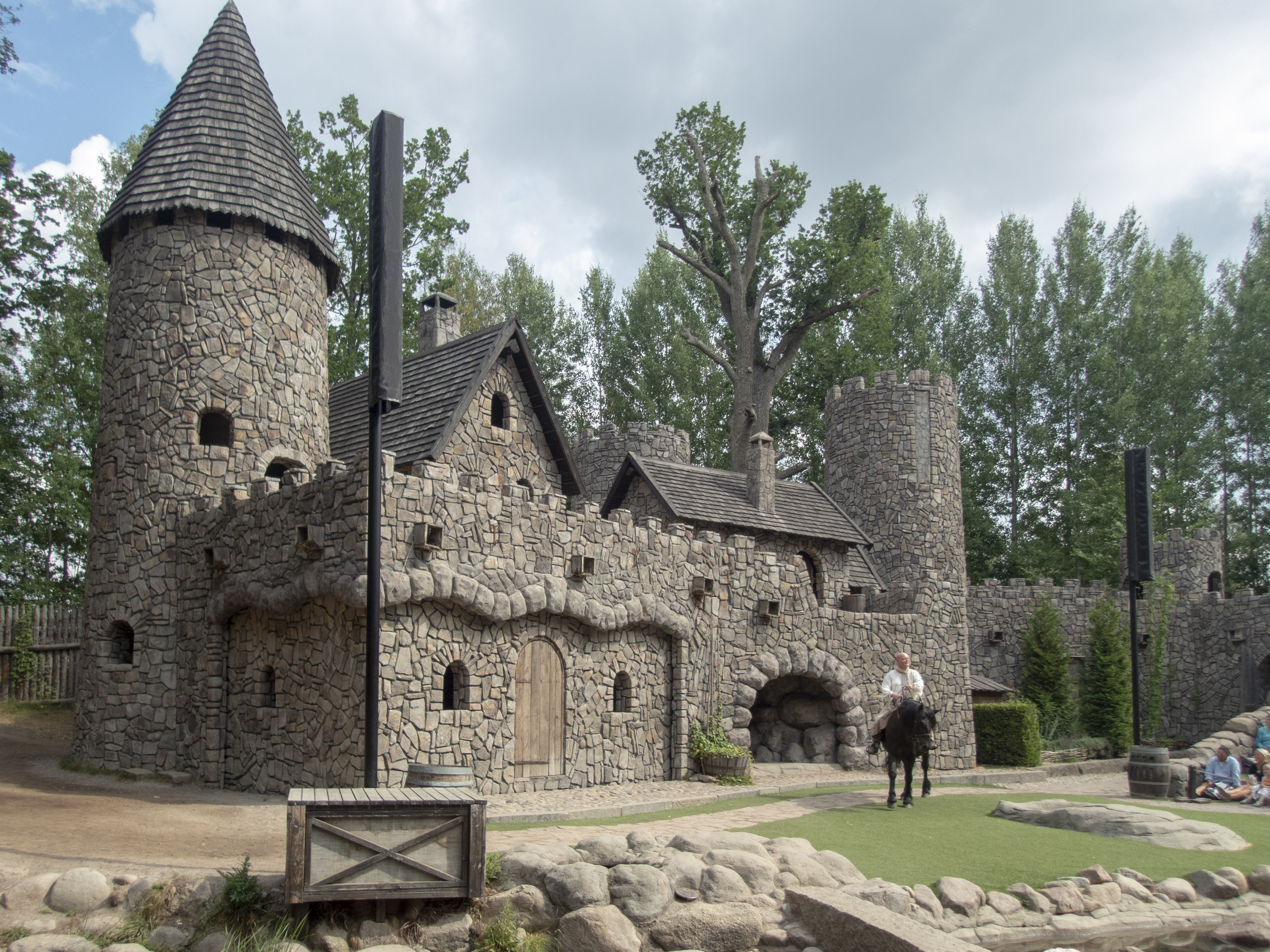
Matt's Fort at Astrid Lindgren's World

Ronia is a girl growing up among a clan of robbers living in a castle in the woodlands of early-Medieval Scandinavia. As the only child of Matt, the chief, she is expected to become the leader of the clan someday. Their castle, Matt's Fort, is split into two parts by a lightning bolt on the day of Ronia's birth. Ronia grows up with Matt's clan of robbers as her only company, until a rival robber group led by Borka moves into the other half of the castle, exacerbating the longstanding rivalry between the two bands.

One day, Ronia sees Birk Borkason, the only child of Borka, idling by the chasm. He is the only other child she has ever met, and so she is sorry that he is a Borka. He engages her in a game of jumping across, which does not end until Birk almost falls down. Ronia saves him, and they eventually become friends.

The following winter is long and cold and although Matt's robbers are well fed, their counterparts are suffering on the other side of the chasm. Ronia brings food to Birk through a secret passageway. They grow very close but both know that they cannot tell their families. In the following spring, Birk is captured by Ronia's father. Ronia gives herself to the Borkas so she must be exchanged, but as a result, her father disowns her and refuses to acknowledge her as his daughter. Birk and Ronia run away to the woods, where they live in a cave and experience several harrowing adventures with the wood's indigenous wildlife, including trolls, forest gnomes, and harpies. Ultimately their families repent of their feuding, and everyone is reunited, but the story concludes with both Ronia and Birk deciding that the robber's life is not for them.

== Adaptations ==
=== Literature ===
In 1983, Trina Schart Hyman illustrated a cover for the book, which is published by Puffin Books.

=== Film ===
In 1984, the book was made into a Swedish fantasy film. It was directed by the Swedish film director Tage Danielsson and adapted for screenplay by Astrid Lindgren herself. It was a major success, becoming the highest-grossing film in Sweden, and winning a Silver Bear at the 1985 Berlin International Film Festival. More than 1.5 million people attended its screenings in Sweden.

=== Musical ===
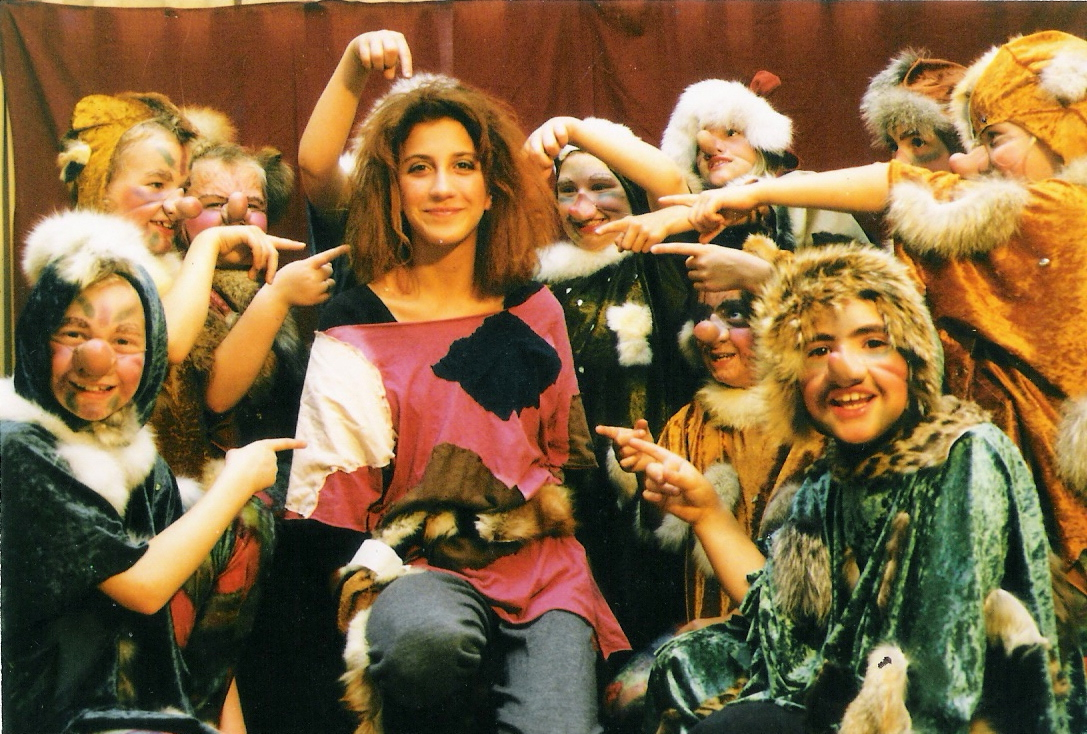
Ronia in the German musical by Axel Bergstedt

In 1991 the book was made into a Danish musical called Ronja Røverdatter. The musical is written by Danish composer Sebastian.

In 1994 the book was made into a German musical called Ronja Räubertochter. The musical is written by Axel Bergstedt in the German language, and has orchestra, band and more than one hundred people on the stage.

=== Stage ===
A production in the Balver Höhle was performed in 1993 and 2004 and in Oberkirch in 2006.

A production of Ronja the Robber's Daughter interpreted by Ronny Danielsson performed at Stadsteatern Stockholm Sweden 2014, 2016, and 2018.

A stage play based on the novel was written by Allison Gregory.

=== TV series ===
==== Live-action ====
A live-action television adaptation of the novel premiered in March 2024. Hans Rosenfeldt wrote the script while Lisa James Larsson directed the series. The series was produced by Filmlance Productions, the company behind Swedish TV productions such as Beck, Bron, and Caliphate.

==== Anime ====
A CGI television series from Japan debuted in October 2014. Titled Sanzoku no Musume Ronia, the show was produced by Dwango, NHK, NHK Enterprises and animated by Polygon Pictures with cooperation from Studio Ghibli. The show was directed by Goro Miyazaki and scripted by Hiroyuki Kawasaki.

== Translations ==
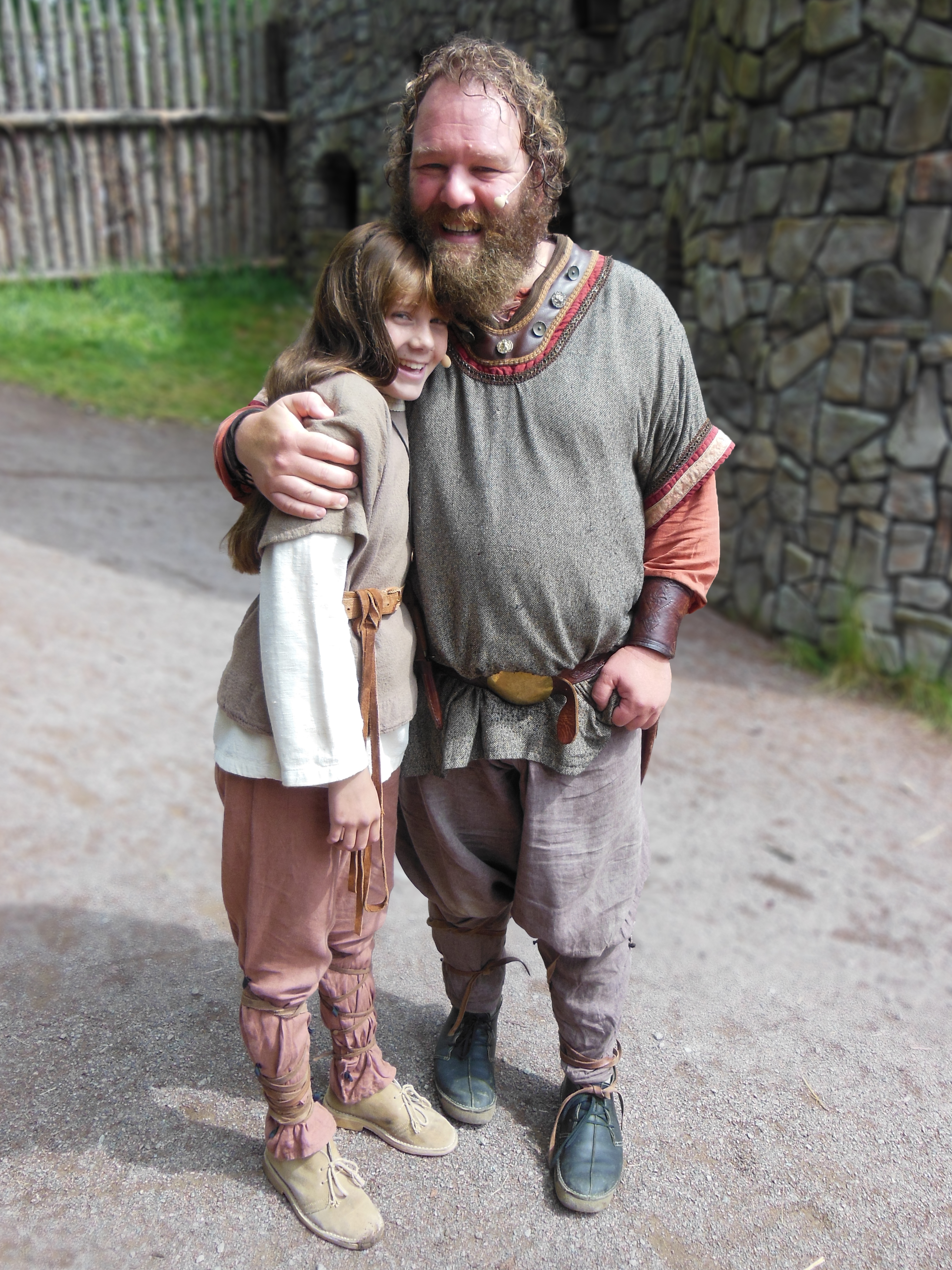
Ronia and her father Mattis, played by actors at Astrid Lindgren's World in Lindgren's home town, Vimmerby, in 2014

Ronia, the Robber's Daughter has been translated into 39 languages. The two English versions translate the Swedish names differently. The Swedish word "rövare" is more akin to the English word reaver, rather than robber (rånare).

Swedish, 1981 Rabén & Sjögren Ronja Rövardotter	English, 1983 Methuen The Robber's Daughter	English, 1985 Puffin Ronia, the Robber's Daughter
Ronja	Kirsty	Ronia
Mattis	Matt	Matt
Lovis	Lena	Lovis
Borka	Ranulf	Borka
Undis	Hanna	Undis
Birk	Burl	Birk
Skalle-Per	Skinny-Pete	Noddle-Pete
Tjegge	Shaggy	Shaggy
Pelje	Proudfoot	Pelle
Fjosok	Fulke	Foolok
Jutis	Jolly	Jutto
Joen	Jip	Jep
Knotas	Knott	Knott
Turre	Tapper	Tapper
Tjorm	Tobbit	Torm
Sturkas	Bumper	Bumper
Lill-Klippen	Snip	Little Snip
