= Wikland =

Wikland is a surname. Notable people with the surname include:

- Anna Wikland, Swedish business executive
- Ilon Wikland (born 1930), Estonian-born Swedish artist and illustrator
