= The Day Adam Got Mad =

Children book

- Author: Astrid Lindgren
- Original title: Småländsk tjurfäktare
- Illustrator: Marit Törnqvist
- Language: Swedish
- Publisher: Rabén & Sjögren
- Publication date: 1991
- Publication place: Sweden
- English publication date: 1993

The Day Adam Got Mad, also Goran's Great Escape (original title: Småländsk tjurfäktare, also När Adam Engelbrekt blev tvärarg or Kalle - den lille tjurfäktaren), is a children's book written by Astrid Lindgren.

== Plot ==
Adam Engelbrecht is a bull. He is quite peaceful, but one day he gets furious. Nobody knows exactly why he has gotten so angry, not even Adam Engelbrecht himself. He is running around the stable and the whole yard. People run away and are afraid of him. Only a very young boy, Kalle, is not scared of Adam Engelbrecht. He talks very gently to Adam Engelbrecht. At first Adam doesn't want to listen to Kalle, but the boy's tender, loving voice is so tempting and beguiling so that Adam Engelbrecht allows the boy to gently pet him. Suddenly Adam Engelbrecht is no longer angry and the boy walks with him back to the stable. The People are impressed, and they keep telling each other the story of the "youngest bullfighter in the world".

== Background ==
Astrid Lindgren wrote the story The Day Adam Got Mad, which is based on a story by her father Samuel August Ericsson.

Before director Johanna Hald made two films about Lotta from The Children on Troublemaker Street, she wanted to make a film adaptation of the book The Day Adam Got Mad. She had already written the script, but Lindgren didn't think the script was good enough and declined. Hald was allowed to make the films about Lotta.

The story of Adam Engelbrecht is also mentioned in the Astrid Lindgren novel Kerstin och jag. The son of the bull Adam Engelbrecht, who shares Adam Engelbrecht's name, lives on the farm along with the twins Barbro and Kerstin. Groom Johann tells the twins about the events of the story The Day Adam Got Mad.

Marit Törnqvist illustrated the book with her pictures. After she had illustrated Astrid Lindgren's book A Calf for Christmas (När Bäckhultarn for till stan), the publisher asked her to read Lindgren's short stories and to think about which one of them she could imagine illustrating. Törnqvist's choice was The Day Adam Got Mad.

== Reception ==
Hilde Umans said that the book is great with an inventive story and full-page drawings. Astrid Lindgren describes how Kalle is able to calm down the bull. The way she wrote about the bull and his bad mood is also admirable.

Annette Y. Goldsmith, Theo Heras and Susan Corapi praised the masterful illustrations by Marit Törnqvist. Kirkus Reviews also found that Marit Törnwvist's illustrations would wonderfully complement the charming story, so they would show an old-fashioned farm, the farming family and neighbors. The book is recommended for children from four to seven years.

Reviewing Kalle de kleine stierenvechter, a translation of Kalle - den lille tjurfäktaren (translated by Rita Verschuur), Mathilde Lemm also praises the illustrations of Törnwvist and describes it as a beautiful, nostalgic picture book that belongs on every shelf.

Tanya Boudreau said that the story reminds the reader to pay attention to the feelings of others, also noting that warmth and friendliness are often the best way to solve problems. Astrid Lindgren's story would never look outdated or sound like it. Valerie Coghlan opined that the book is excellent and timeless.
