= The Ghost of Skinny Jack =

- Author: Astrid Lindgren
- Original title: Skinn Skerping – Hemskast av alla spöken i Småland
- Illustrator: Ilon Wikland
- Language: Swedish
- Publisher: Rabén & Sjögren
- Publication date: 1986
- Publication place: Sweden
- English publication date: 1988

The Ghost of Skinny Jack (original title: Skinn Skerping – Hemskast av alla spöken i Småland) is a children's book written by Astrid Lindgren.

== Plot ==
A girl and her older brother are at their grandmother house, who always tells them ghost stories. They love to hear the story of Skinny Jack, a servant who loved to do pranks. One night Skinny Jack disguised himself as a ghost to scare the sexton in the church. When the sexton ran out, Skinny Jack wanted to follow, but on the way out, something seemed to grab him. Skinny Jack believed it was a ghost, or God himself, who wanted to punish him. The next day people found him. His blood was frozen to ice, so he was neither dead nor alive. He stayed in church for about a hundred years and nobody dared to get close to him, until a maid came to the town who was not afraid of anything. A rich man wanted to know if the maid was actually as brave as she said and offered her five crowns to bring Skinny Jack to him. The maid did so and got five crowns, but she hadn't said that she would bring Skinny Jack back, so the man offered her five crowns again. The maid took Skinny Jack on her back again, but shortly before she arrived at the church, Skinny Jack put his cold ghost fingers around her neck. He forced her to carry him to the grave of the sexton. There he asked for forgiveness. The sexton replied that if God forgave him, he would forgive Skinny Jack. Skinny Jack immediately collapsed into a pile of ashes. From then on the maid was no longer quite right in the head.

When the siblings have finished listening to the story of Skinny Jack, their grandmother gives the boy a guitar and the girl a bag with magazines. She ties the magazine bag onto the girl's back. Then she tells the children to get home before it is dark. The boy is playing the guitar. He suggests going over the mountain and since his sister would follow him everywhere, she follows him this time too. The road is long and the magazines on the girl's back weigh heavily. She would rather carry Skinny Jack, says the girl, but then she gets scared because she knows that ghosts come when someone calls them by their name. When she watches her brother disappearing into the bushes, the girl no longer dares to walk. She believes that Skinny Jack could hide anywhere there, but finally she pulls herself together and starts walking. Then she believes that Skinny Jack's hands get hold of her. She screams and thinks there is no salvation for her. Then she hears her father's voice. The latter asks what she and her brother are doing there. He frees her from a hazel branch. Then the father carries the crying girl to his carriage. The girl gets home along with her brother and father. At dinner, the girl asks her brother if he thinks that she went mad just like the maid. Then the brother replies that she is not as crazy as the maid.

== Background ==
The Ghost of Skinny Jack is based on a true story. In July 1916 Astrid Lindgren (then Ericsson) and her brother Gunnar Ericsson visited their grandmother Ida Ingström, who often told them legends and ghost stories. She did this also on that day. She told her grandchildren about the Skinn Skerping ghost. After Ida Ingström had told her grandchildren the story, she gave Gunnar Ericsson a guitar and Astrid Lindgren a thick book. Then the two went home. Lindgren later said in an interview from that moment on she only lied in the book. Her father did not come and did not save her from Skinn Skerping. She and her brother had to get back themselves. In the evening they finally arrived at home all run down.

In 1986 the book Skinn Skerping hemskast av alla spöken i Småland was published in Sweden by Rabén & Sjögren. Ilon Wikland illustrated the book. In 1988 an English version of the book was published.

== Awards ==
Expressens Heffaklump

- 1986: Ilon Wikland
