= War Diaries, 1939–1945 =

Published diary

- Author: Astrid Lindgren
- Original title: Krigsdagböcker
- Language: Swedish
- Genre: Diary
- Publisher: Rabén & Sjögren
- Publication date: 2015
- Publication place: Sweden
- English publication date: 2016

War Diaries, 1939–1945 (Swedish: Krigsdagböcker) is a book written by Astrid Lindgren. It contains the diary entries that Lindgren made during the Second World War. The book has been translated into many different languages including German and English.

== Content ==
On 1 September 1939 Lindgren's diary started with the words "Oh! War broke out today. Nobody could believe it". Then she documented the events of the war with the help of newspaper articles and letters. In doing so, she did not only mention the threat posed by Hitler, but also that of Stalin, when the latter was attacking Finland, for example. While Lindgren initially feared Stalin and a Russian invasion much more than Hitler, her image of Germany changed more and more to the worse. She got angry with the Germans, who managed to get the rest of humanity up against themselves every twenty years causing two world wars. At the same time, Lindgren also showed compassion for the Germans when the bombs were dropped on Berlin.

== Background ==
From 1 September 1939 to 31 December 1945, Astrid Lindgren wrote a diary in which she told her view of the war, but also collected newspaper articles and letters about what was happening. When Lindgren started writing the diary, she was 32 years old and lived in Stockholm along with her husband Sture Lindgren and their two children. At that time she was working as a secretary for the Royal Automobile Club. With the exception of a few short stories in newspapers, Lindgren had not published anything. In 1940 she got a new job. She had to read German letters on behalf of the Swedish intelligence agency. This job gave her deeper insights into the war, which she also found its way into her diary. Although it was not actually allowed to do so, Lindgren copied a few letters and put them into her diary. Astrid Lindgren's main focus in the diary was on the war and its impact on her and her family. The book tells little about other personal experiences. During that time Lindgren's marriage was in a crisis, her husband was hardly at home, fell in love with another woman and became increasingly addicted to alcohol, but this was hardly mentioned in the diaries.

Lindgren's family knew the war diaries. Her husband Sture and her two children Lasse and Karin Lindgren contributed information or listened to Lindgren when she read entries from the diary.

Lindgren wrote her diaries onto a total of 17 notebooks. Astrid Lindgren never thought of publishing her diaries during her lifetime. The diaries were published in 2015 by Lindgren's community of heirs, Saltkråkan AB. Lindgren's grandson Nils Nyman later said that when he read the diaries, he felt that Lindgren wanted a publication of the books. Therefore, the family decided to publish the diaries. Critics share this view, as Lindgren often wrote to an imaginary readership.

Lindgren's granddaughter Annika Lindgren explained that hardly any editorial changes were made when publishing her grandmother's diary. Some newspaper clippings were not printed in the book, but all newspaper clippings that Astrid Lindgren commented on can also be found in the book. Otherwise, only trivialities were left out.

In Sweden, the war diaries started a debate about what was known in the country about the crimes of the Nazis during that time.

While Lindgren was writing her war diaries, she was writing Pippi Longstocking. This was also mentioned in the war diaries.

== Reception ==
Awards

- 2015 LovelyBooks Leserpreis

Critics

According to Stefanie Panzenböck from Falter, Lindgren created a valuable piece of contemporary history that shows a perspective of the Second World War that is unusual for Central Europe.

Lothar Schröder from Rheinische Post wrote that diaries are rarely as poignant as this one, with all of the writer's initial ingenuity and her growing desire to understand a little more of this disrupted world.

Kurt Tutschek from Piqd stated that Astrid Lindgren records everyday things and describes a Swedish family in times of war. The entries that depict the horrors of the war always include hopeful, happy moments, like when she wrote about Pippi Longstocking.
