= Marit Törnqvist =

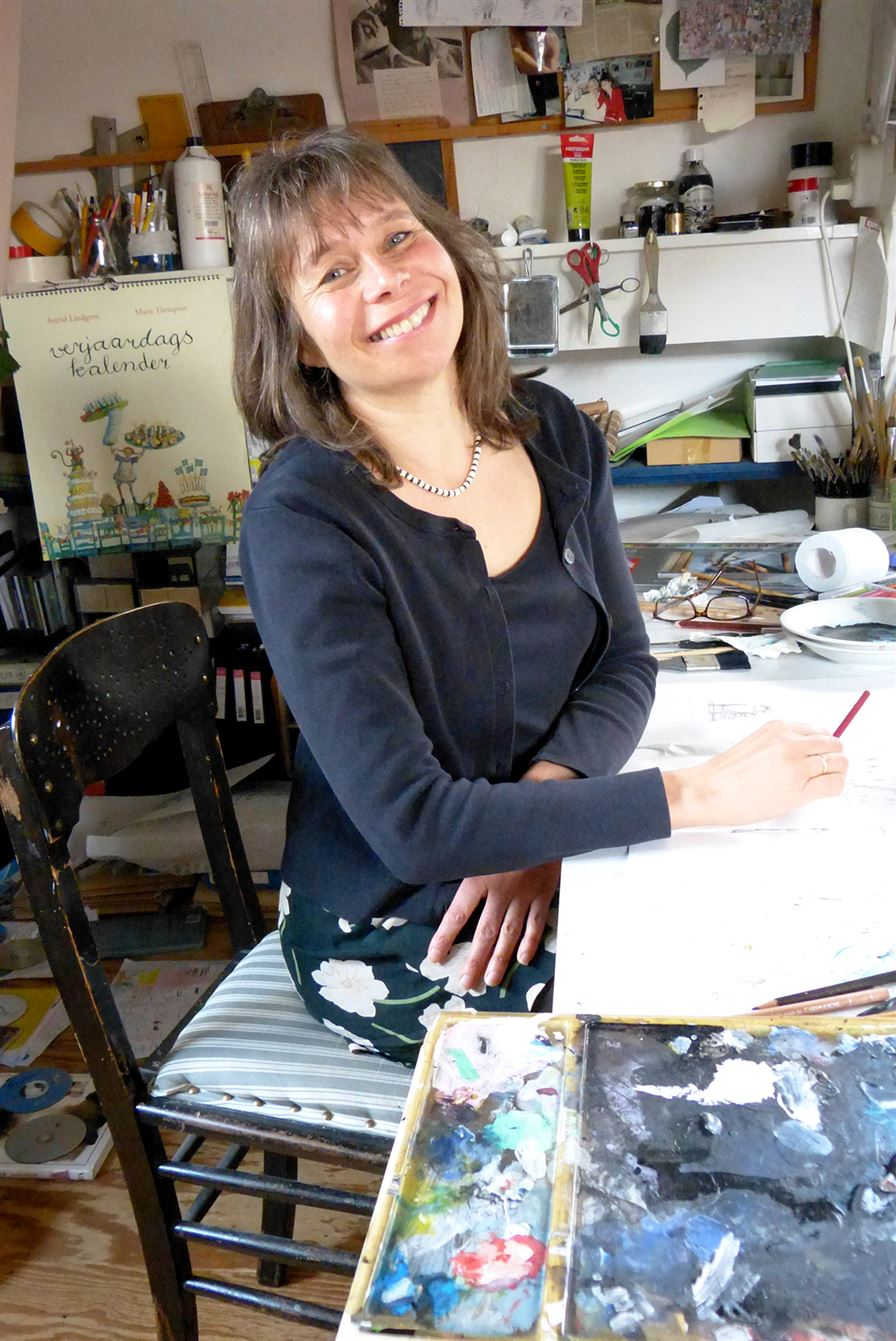
Törnqvist in 2016

Marit Törnqvist (born January 19, 1964) is a Swedish-Dutch author, artist and illustrator. She is best known for her illustrations in the books of Astrid Lindgren.

== Career ==
From 1982 to 1987 Törnqvist went to the Gerrit Rietveld Academy in Amsterdam. In 1989 Marit Törnqvist illustrated her first book The Christmas Carp (Swedish: Julkarpen) with her mother. They created it after a visit to Prague during the Christmas season.

At the same time Törnqvist applied in Sweden as an illustrator and the publishing house Raben & Sjögren in Stockholm asked her not only to make the illustrations to the Christmas Carp but also to make a picturebook with Astrid Lindgren. Her first Lindgren book was published in 1989 När Bäckhultarn for till stan. She soon worked closely with the Swedish author and made several books with her.

In 1995, Törnqvist wrote and illustrated the book A Small story about Love (Swedish: Liten berättelse om kärlek). In 1996, it was awarded with the Dutch literary prize Zilveren Griffel.

Törnqvist has two daughters. She professionally and privately supports refugees, including offering housing to rejected asylum seekers.

== Personal life ==
Marit Törnqvist is the daughter of Egil Törnqvist, a professor of Scandinavian Studies at the University of Amsterdam and an academic literary critic. Her mother is author and translator Rita Törnqvist Verschuur.

Törnqvist moved to the Netherlands at the age of five. Her mother translated the books of Astrid Lindgren into Dutch. Thus, Törnqvist grew up with Lindgren's literature.

Törnqvist divides her place of residence between Amsterdam and Östergötland. She was widowed in 2024.

== Works (selection) ==
=== As an illustrator ===
==== Illustrated Astrid Lindgren books ====
- A Calf for Christmas (När Bäckhultarn for till stan, 1989)
- The Day Adam Got Mad (När Adam Engelbrekt blev tvärarg, 1991)
- In the Land of Twilight (I skymningslandet, 1994)
- The Red Bird (Sunnanäng, 2003)
- The Story Journey From Junedale to Nangilima (Sagoresan, 2006)
- Alla ska sova (2019)

==== Further works ====
- The Christmas Carp (Julkarpen, 1989, together with her mother Rita Törnqvist Verschuur)
- Bigger than a dream (Större än en dröm, 2013, author: Jef Aerts)
- Jij bent de herrste (2014, authors: Hans Hagen and Monique Hagen)
- Helden op sokken (1988, author: Annie Keuper-Makkink)
- Een verhaal voor Hizzel (1994, author: Klaas van Assen)

=== As an author ===
- Small Story about love (Liten berättelse om kärlek, 1995)
- Blowing bubbles in Burundi (Bellen blazen in Burundi, 2007)
- What nobody expected (Wat niemand had verwacht, 2009)
- Charlie's Magical Carnival (2014)
- The island of happiness (Het gelukkige eiland, 2016)

== Awards and nominations ==
=== Awards ===
Zilveren Griffel

- 1996: Small Story about love
- 2018: Het gelukkige eiland

Gouden Penseel

- 2006: Pikkuhenki

Boekenpauw

- 2018: Het gelukkige eiland

=== Nominations ===
Hans Christian Andersen Award

- 2016: short list

Astrid Lindgren Memorial Award

- 2009, 2010, 2011, 2012, 2013, 2014, 2015, 2016, 2017, 2018, 2019
