= The Red Bird (Astrid Lindgren book) =

1959 book by Astrid Lindgren

- Author: Astrid Lindgren
- Original title: Sunnanäng
- Illustrator: Marit Törnqvist
- Language: Swedish
- Publisher: Rabén & Sjögren
- Publication date: 1959
- Publication place: Sweden
- English publication date: 2005

The Red Bird (original title: Sunnanäng) is a children's book written by Astrid Lindgren.

== Plot ==
The parents of the siblings Anna and Mattias have died. Thus, they have to live in the house of the Myra farmer. The Myra farmer takes advantage of the siblings, who have to work hard and are not allowed to play. Therefore, they are already looking forward to the school which starts in winter. At school, they hope to no longer feel like two gray mice, but as soon as the school has started they realize that nothing is going change in school either. Just as Anna mentions this towards Mattias on her way home, a red bird appears. The two children follow the bird into a warm, beautiful country called Sunnanäng. In Sunnanäng there are a lot of children who want to play with Anna and Mattias. There is also a mother who is the mother of all children and also the mother of Mattias and Anna. The siblings have a lot of fun in the country but soon they have to go home. They find out that the gate to their home country, once closed, can never be opened again. Soon Anna and Mattias always go to Sunnanäng after school. They also go there on their last day of school. They close the gate and decide to stay there forever.

== Publishing ==
In 1959, Sunnanäng was first published in the Swedish book Sunnanäng including several short stories. This book was illustrated by Ilon Wikland and was not translated into English. The story was later published in Sweden as a single picture book, illustrated by Marit Törnqvist. The picture book was first published in English in 2005.

== Analysis ==
Astrid Lindgren wrote once that a grown-up reader, including herself, certainly believes that Mattias and Anna die because of the cold winter before they are able to reach their Sunnanäng, but all children - including the child in her - know that this is not true. They know that Mattias and Anna are closing the gate that separates the cold and darkness of the winter forest from the eternal spring of Sunnanäng. Lindgren mentioned two different ways of analyzing the story, the different interpretations of adults and children. At the same time she speaks of the belief of adult readers and the knowledge of child readers. Susanne Gascke of Die Zeit writes that adults should not destroy the children's illusion of - or the justified hope for - redemption. On the other hand, as disillusioned and hopeless adults, adults could learn from their children how they can believe in happy endings and miracles again.

== Exhibitions, projects and workshops ==
The book The Red Bird was used for projects in different countries.

The copyright of the book in Iran was donated to the Koodaki Institute for the Study of the History of Children's Literature by Marit Törnqvist and the family of Astrid Lindgren. This institute uses the book for the Read with Me project in areas of Iran where children have less access to education. In the Read with Me project, children are instructed to share their books with other children and siblings are encouraged to read stories to each other. This should help them to learn important skills that they need for school.

Illustrator Marit Törnqvist used the book in workshops for different groups of children in Isfahan and Tehran. These workshops should help disadvantaged children to learn to read.

In Sweden, the book, in the Arabic version, was given to 30,000 refugee children. The project was initiated by Saltkråkan AB, the company of Astrid Lindgren's family, and the children's book publisher Rabén & Sjögren. It was created in cooperation with the Migration Agency and Save the Children. The initiative for the project came from Marit Törnqvist. The latter visited a refugee center and brought a copy of the book translated into Arabic. The reactions of adults and children were immediately noticeable - they flipped through the book, read and interpreted the book and laughed. She believed that the book should be given to all Arabic-speaking children in their own language as a welcome gift. She hoped that Sweden would also become a kind of Sunnanäng for those children.

In Germany, in Marburg, the book was used for the event Deutsche und arabische Kinder lesen ein Märchen von Astrid Lindgren (German and Arab children read a fairy tale by Astrid Lindgren), in which, among other things, contact between German and Arab children was established.

Törnqvist's illustrations for the book have been exhibited in various museums and libraries. These included the New York Public Library, the Canoon Cultural Center in Iran, the Swedish Museum Näktergalen, the Bibliotheek Rotterdam, the CODA Museum in Apeldoorn, the Openbare Bibliotheek Amsterdam and the town hall in Aalsmeer.

== Reception ==
Sonnenau (Sunnanäng) is the namesake of some German institutions, such as family centers, nurseries or hospices.

The Red Bird received mostly positive reviews, although critics disagree about the interpretation of the end of the book. There is also no uniform opinion about the age at which children should read the stories. Kirkus Reviews recommended the book for children from eight to ten years and Ikvindlezenleuk.nl from six years, while Kinderbuchlesen.de recommended it for children aged four to six.

Axel Schmitt opined that The Red Bird is a very sad story, which is nevertheless one of the best fairy tales from Astrid Lindgren, and that the enchanting illustrations by Marit Törnqvist are an ingenious implementation of the story. He stated that like sun, shadows are part of life, laughing and suffering belong to the life. This is told by Astrid Lindgren in such simple and poignant way that it becomes understandable for children, and they can learn that imagination makes some bad times more bearable.

Swantje Thiele siad that the book is written in a fairy-tale-typical, pictorial language. The motive of death is treated subtle, since the story allows different forms of interpretations. In addition, the death in the fairy tale is at the same time connected with hope and miracles. The fairy tale made it clear that imagination is able to help people in difficult times. The story is worth reading for both children and adults, and encourages further thinking.

The Bulletin of the Center for Children's Books praised Törnqvist's illustrations.

== Literature ==
- Sten Wistrand: Astrid Lindgrens "mest problematiska bok". Ontologi, genre och funktion i Sunnanäng
- Asplund Ingemark, Camilla: The Chronotope of the Legend in Astrid Lindgren's Sunnanäng. In: Genre – Text – Interpretation: Multidisciplinary Perspectives on Folklore and Beyond, Kaarina Koski (Editor), Ulla Savolainen. BoD – Books on Demand, 2019. P. 232 – 250, ISBN 9789522227386
- Ying Toijer-Nilsson: Sunnanäng Törnqvists bilder bäst i det grå
