= Kati (book series) =

Novel series by Astrid Lindgren

- Kati i Amerika (Kati in America, 1951); Kati i Italien (Kati in Italy, 1952); Kati i Paris (Kati in Paris, 1953)
- Author: Astrid Lindgren
- Illustrator: Margit Uppenberg; Maivor Persson Malm
- Country: Sweden
- Language: Swedish
- Genre: Girl novel
- Publisher: Bonniers (Sweden); Brockhampton Press (UK); Grosset & Dunlap (US)
- Published: 1950 – 1953
- Published in English: 1953 – 1964
- Media type: Print (hardback & paperback)
- No. of books: 3

Kati is a Swedish novel series by Astrid Lindgren. It tells the story of Kati, who travels, first to America, then to Italy and Paris. The novels were translated into many languages including English, German, Spanish, French and Russian.

== Characters ==
=== Kati ===
Kati is 21 and works as a typist in an office in Stockholm. Kati lost her parents as a small child. After that, she moved in with her aunt Wilhelmina.

=== Eva ===
Eva is Kati's best friend. At the age of 20, Eva moves from Aamaal to Stockholm. There she works together with Kati in an office. At the age of 22 Eva travels with Kati to Italy and later to Paris. Eva is blond, talkative and quick-witted. She falls in love very fast but loses interest just as quickly.

=== Aunt Wilhelmina ===
Kati grows up with her aunt Wilhelmina. She has a very ambivalent relationship with Wilhelmina. On the one hand, she loves her very much, on the other hand, she wants to be independent from her. Aunt Wilhelmina, who is simply called aunt by Kati, still thinks that Kati is the small, dear, helpless child that came to Wilhelmina after her parents died. Therefore she organises everything for Kati, even though Kati has already grown up. Kati's aunt is a bit old-fashioned and religious. She seems strict at first, but is very nice. Therefore, she takes her promise, that she gave Kati's mother on the deathbed, to take care of Kati seriously. When Wilhelmina learns that Kati wants to go to America, she wants to join Kati to protect her. Later, Wilhelmina stays in America to marry Andrew. Even from America, she keeps in touch with Kati and supports her. For example, she contributes money for Kati's trip to Italy.

=== Jan ===
Jan is a young, promising architect who does not have much money. He starts dating Kati when she is 19 years old. Later he tells Kati about his trips to America, which is why Kati wants to travel there. While Jan loves Kati, Kati is not sure about her feelings.

=== Lennart Sundman ===
Lennart grows up in Sweden near the lake Kamholmsfjord. Then he moves to the west coast, along with his parents. As an only child he loves animals, especially dogs, very much. His father dies when Lennart is very young. Later Lennart becomes a lawyer and moves to Stockholm. In Italy, he meets Kati and falls in love with her. Lennart is very dark with a southern brown skin. He is described as intelligent, calm, sincere and tender. Lennart laughs a lot, but at the same time he also has melancholic and childlike traits.

=== Peter Bjökman ===
Peter grows up in Sweden along with his parents. Peter's father loved only one woman, Peter's mother, but she constantly cheated on him. When she died, Peter's father nearly mourned to death. Peter does not want to experience the same and decides not commit to any woman, but that changes when he meets Eve. Peter is a wealthy businessman and sells printing presses. He is tall and dances very well.

=== Andrew ===
Andrew is Aunt Wilhelmina's old childhood friend. When the two meet again in America, Andrew makes Wilhelmina a marriage proposal. Wilhelmina decides to stay in America.

== Story ==
Kati in America plays in 1945. At that time the racial segregation still existed and is also described in Lindgren's novel Kati in America. In Kati in Italy Kati is one year older. Seven months after the events in Italy Kati in Paris starts.

=== Kati in America ===
Kati's boyfriend Jan tells her about his trip to the USA. Kati gets excited about it and wants to go there as well. She tells her Aunt Wilhelmina about it. Wilhelmina doesn't want Kati to travel alone and decides to join her.

In New York, Kati meets Mr. Bates who lost his cook and his maid. He needs someone to cook for his twelve guests in the evening. Wilhelmina helps out. Through Mr. Bates' daughter Marion meets Kati Bob, with whom she travels through America. Wilhelmina is not very fond of Bob, but still participates in the road trip.

When Kati sees how black people are being treated in America, she is shocked. There are seating arrangements in buses, black people live in poorer areas, have less access to work and education, are not allowed to enter restaurants or concerts for white people etc. A chauffeur tells Katie about a "good (well-behaved) negro, that is a negro who lies five feet underground". Some of Kati's new friends believe that the white race needs to maintain their supremacy. Furthermore, they don't want to shake the hands of a black person. Kati tries to support the black people, but finds it very hard.

After Kati has met Bob's family, Bob and Kati's ways separate. While Wilhelmina is happy that Bob is gone, Kati misses him at first. Later, however, she enjoys the trips to the Mississippi and New Orleans. There she meets the guide John Hammond, with whom she enjoys a nice evening.

In Chicago, Kati and Wilhelmina meet Kati's uncle Elof, who emigrated to America at the age of 22. Elof invites Kati and Wilhelmina to his home. There Wilhelmina meets Andrew, an old childhood friend. The two fall in love and want to marry. Wilhelmina stays in America. In New York, Kati meets Bob for the last time before heading home to Sweden. In Sweden Jan waits for Kati at the airport.

=== Kati in Italy ===
Jan wants to marry Kati, but Kati has doubts. It bothers her that Jan always tries to change her into a different person. If she is funny, he finds her silly, but at the same time she is not allowed to be too serious. She asks Jan to give her one year time to decide whether she wants to marry him or not. When Jan agrees, she directly asks her best friend Eva to move in with her.

When Kati and Eva win 3,000 crowns, they decide to travel to Italy. Jan doesn't like this as he is afraid about losing Kati to an Italian man. Kati and Eva plan to leave any way. In Italy, they experience many adventures. In Venice, Kati meets Lennart Sundman from Stockholm. She is immediately fascinated by the handsome, southern-looking man. The two make a beautiful gondola ride, but they lose each other in the crowd in the piazza and can not find each other again.

Although Kati thinks she has lost Lennart forever, she believes that he is her true love. She writes to Jan in a letter and breaks up with him. Kati and Eva travel to Florence. When Kati looks at engagement rings at a jewellery store, Kati suddenly meets Lennart again. The two spend a lot of time together. While Kati is sure of her feelings for Lennart, she wonders what Lennart think about her. In Rome, Lennart does not call as he has promised before. Instead, Kati receives a lovely letter from Jan, in which he explains that he hopes Kati has found someone else who will make her happier than he ever could. Nevertheless, he hopes that she would think with warmth of the time together. Kati does so, but she is also always longing for Lennart.

One night Eva does not want to go out because of a headache. That is why Kati spends the evening together with another traveller. In a restaurant she discovers Eva and Lennart, who are sitting and laughing there together. Shocked and deeply disappointed, Kati runs out of the restaurant. The next day Kati and Eva drive to Naples. There Kati tells Eva about her observations in the restaurant. Eva explains that Lennart called when Kati was gone, and she did not want to let him go because of Kati. She had met with him and persuaded him to change his travel plans.

Suddenly Lennart stands in front of the Kati. Kati and Lennart spend a lovely time together. Quite surprisingly, Lennart asks Kati if she wants to marry him. He bought her the engagement rings she was already looking at in Florence. Kati agrees.

=== Kati in Paris ===
Seven months after Lennart's marriage proposal, Kati and Lennart travel to Paris to get married. They marry in a small chapel. After their wedding, Eva, Lennart and Kati travel through Paris together and take a closer look at the city.

At Café Flore they meet Peter Björkmann, a rich business man from Sweden. Peter is interested in Eva, but Eva prefers to do something with Henri Bertrand, a student from the next room in the hotel. At a dinner together, Eva and Peter tell each other that they both do not want to commit to anyone and also do not want marry. Eva tells about Henri Bertrand, while Peter says that he is currently interested in Eva, but that this would pass by. In the evening Eva dances with Peter and is thrilled about his dancing skills, but she often ignores him later to be with Henri.

Back in Stockholm, Lennart and Kati move into a new flat, directly opposite to Eva's flat. Eva cries as she returns to her flat alone, without her former flatmate Kati, but she is often invited by Kati and Lennart. Peter also visits the friends. He tells Kati that he is still in love with Eva, because she is giving him the diversity and change he is longing for. He even wants to marry Eva.

Meanwhile, Lennart and Kati have their first bigger fight. Just when they start to get along better Kati suddenly meets Jan in the city. They are drinking a coffee together and Jan shows Kati his engagement ring. When Lennart gets to know about the meeting, he leaves the flat in rage. Later the couple decides to reconcile.

Soon after this Peter confesses his love to Eva, but Eva rejects him. Peter decides not to visit Lennart and Kati any longer because he could meet Eva there.

A few months later Kati becomes pregnant and prepares for the birth. Meanwhile, Eva has changed. She cries a lot and often stays alone in her flat. Peter starts to visit Kati and Lennart again. He says he has missed them and comes into their flat. Shortly after this, Eva also join the flat. When she realises that Peter is there as well, she turns pale. Eva admits that she might be in love with Peter. The two want to try to be together. Soon after this, Kati gets her first son.

== Background ==
In 1949 Astrid Lindgren was asked by a publisher of Bonniers to write a series of travelling stories for the magazine Damernas värld. When Lindgren had written the series, the publisher realised that they should also be published in book form. The stories, which were originally meant for grown-ups, were changed into a set of three girl novels. The Swedish editions were published in 1950 (Kati i Amerika), 1952 (Kati på Kaptensgatan) and 1953 (Kati i Paris). The text remained mainly the same, but small edits have been made. A critical section on Catholic customs was removed in the girls books, as well as some interactions between Kati and her aunt and some landmarks during the journey through southern France.

The books were illustrated by Margit Uppenberg under the pseudonym Gobi (Kati i Amerika and Kati i Italien) and by Maivor Persson Malm (Kati i Paris).

Kati in America is based on Lindgren's own experiences in America. During a trip to New Orleans Lindgren experienced a lot of racism. White people didn't want to shake the hands of black people. A white taxi driver explained: "A good negro is a negro, that is five feet under ground" (en bra neger, det är en neger som ligger fem fot under jorden). Astrid Lindgren was shocked and her protagonist Kati experiences similar things. Astrid Lindgren also processed other experiences in her book. Kati locks herself out with a pot of potatoes on the stove. She climbs the façade on the fifth floor and climbs into the flat through the kitchen window. Lindgren has experienced this as well. In Kati in Italy and Kati in Paris she processed experiences from travelling with her husband to Italy and France.

In an exchange of letters with a reader, Astrid Lindgren explains she did not really feel like Kati at the age of 19 or 20. At that age she was struggling with her life. Only later did she thought that life was quite pleasant. Kati was more grown-up than she in the book.

== Reviews ==
Jörg Bohn explained that the books were still listed as "exciting, refreshingly unconventional and timelessly modern" at the time of publication, but now there are a little out dated. Bohn said that the books are a good representation of the life in the 1940s and 1950s.

Fredrik Sonck believed that the series is primarily interesting as a document of the time, and is worth reading on account of Lindgren's use of language. It also shows how language is changing. Nowadays the word negro is unusable, except if the use of it is problematized or discussed. In the books Lindgren depicts words like "nigger", "pickaninnie" and "darkie" as derogatory, but she uses the word negro a dozen times, showing that connotations to the word might simply not have arisen back then, or they were so deeply embedded in the word that people of that time could not identify them. In her books Astrid Lindgren critically examines the racism in America. Her protagonist Kati is shocked about the racial segregation and the way black people were threatened.

Gabrielle Cromme said that Lindgren's Kati series does without any "pedagogical intervention". According to her many other girl novels during that time would try to educate the girls. In the Kati books the joy and cosmopolitanism are dominant.

Jana Mikota said that the Kati series don't correspond with "the traditional understanding of girls literature". The readers meet young women who are interested in literature, history and politics. The girls are quick-witted and can laugh at themselves.

Birgitta Theander loved the huge joy of life the books represent. According to her the dialogue is always fast and beautiful. She thought that within the books the reader gets closer to Kati's personal emotional life. The love story in Kati is "pardon, madness and bliss" ("den är hänryckning, kval och salighet").
