= Min ko vill ha roligt =

1990 book by Astrid Lindgren

- Author: Astrid Lindgren; Kristina Forslund
- Language: Swedish
- Subject: Animal welfare
- Publisher: Rabén & Sjögren
- Publication date: 1990
- Publication place: Sweden

Min ko vill ha roligt (English: My Cow Wants to Have Fun) is a book written by Astrid Lindgren and Kristina Forslund. It contains all articles concerning animal protection and mass production that Lindgren and Forslund wrote in the Swedish magazines Expressen and Dagens Nyheter from 1985 to 1989. Their activities led to a new Swedish law which was later called Lex Lindgren and was announced at Lindgren's 80th birthday.

== Content ==
On May 3, 1985, Astrid Lindgren wrote an article for the Dagens Nyheter magazine. She criticized the development of the so-called cow trainers, who used electric shocks to force the cows to put their dung into the chute. In addition, she did not think it was right that the cows were often no longer able to be outside, but were instead confined. Astrid Lindgren then received a letter from Kristina Forslund, a veterinarian and lecturer at the University of Veterinary Medicine. Lindgren asked her to help her with an awareness campaign to promote better animal treatment in Sweden. At that point, Forslund was on the verge of giving up her career as a veterinarian. She was fed up with prescribing antibiotics and medication to animals whose real problem was improper animal husbandry. The only way how Forslund could imagine going on, was to change the things that she thought were going wrong. A collaboration between Forslund and Lindgren followed, in which Lindgren brought in her journalistic skills and Forslund her specialist knowledge. From then on, they wrote and published articles in the Swedish magazine Expressen. These articles were dealing with animal suffering and maximizing profits. In the articles, Lindgren and Forslund mainly criticized agricultural policy, the industrialization of agriculture and less the farmers, who, according to the authors, also wanted that the animals are well.

== Background ==
The book contains both articles that Astrid Lindgren and Kristina Forslund wrote for newspapers, as well as personal letters in which the authors criticized the treatment of animals in factory farming.

After the articles were published in the Swedish newspaper Expressen, Lindgren and Forslund put the articles together in chronological order. A comment was written behind each article on what happened after it was published. The authors also wrote about how they started to work together and how they felt about the change in the Animal Welfare Act. The book was first published in Sweden in 1990. It was translated into Dutch, German, Norwegian and parts of it in English.

== Impact of the articles ==
The publication of the articles led to a new animal protection law in Sweden. It was presented to Astrid Lindgren on her 80th birthday and was called Lex Lindgren. During that time it was the strictest law concerning animal welfare in the world.

These are the most important things that were added to the law:

- §2 Animals should be treated well and protected against unnecessary suffering and illness.
- §4 Animals must be kept and cared for in a good animal environment and in such a way that it promotes their health and allows them to behave naturally.
- §13 When animals are brought to slaughter and when slaughtered, they shall be spared from unnecessary discomfort and suffering.

Forslund and Lindgren had fought for the new law for three years, but they were not happy with it. A little had improved for some animals, but not enough and in most areas there was no improvement. For example, the right to graze was only granted to breeding animals, not to fattening animals. The size of the chicken cage was only increased much later and the slaughter regulations were kept too vague.

== English releases ==
The book has not been released in English as a whole, but some parts of it were published in 1989 by the Animal Welfare Institute in the book How Astrid Lindgren achieved enactment of the 1988 law protecting farm animals in Sweden - a selection of articles and letters published in Expressen, Stockholm, 1985-1989. The book contains 27 pages, while the Swedish book Min ko vill ha roligt contains 99 pages. Next to this Forslund has published a few of the articles on her website, where she also mentions what kind of changes came with the new law.

== Reception ==
According to Brigitte Jakobeit from Die Zeit, Min ko vill ha roligt is a book about the history of animal husbandry and where it led to. Furthermore, it is about profit making and politics. She said that the book will be loved by children, adults and animal welfare activists.

Andreas Berger from the Braunschweiger Zeitung praised Lindgren's and Forslund's clearly written articles. Lindgren does not make any naive arguments, protecting the Swedish farmers who have reluctantly followed the new boom in factory farming. She praised their will for contributing to animal welfare and demands support from the state. She said that raising animals without cruelty must be worthwhile. Astrid Lindgren reports very drastically on industrial pig slaughter, but sometimes she also chooses satirical formats. At one point Lindgren even writes about a dream in which God goes on an inspection trip and is horrified.

leseforum.isb.bayern.de stated that the book is a sympathetic plea against factory farming. Even thirty years after it was published, it can encourage young people to get involved in this still important topic.

Istdasvegan.eu highly recommended the book because it deals with the topic in a child-friendly way, but it doesn't glorify or gloss over anything.

David Rudd said that the book, among Lindgren's other works, shows that there "are no privileged categories in Lindgren's world, fictional or factual" and that "cows can want to have fun" too.

== Editions ==
- Astrid Lindgren & Kristina Forslund (1990): How Astrid Lindgren achieved enactment of the 1988 law protecting farm animals in Sweden. USA, Washington, D.C: Animal Welfare Institute (English, parts of the book only)
- Astrid Lindgren & Kristina Forslund (1990): En hij zag dat het niet goed was. Ploegsma, Amsterdam, ISBN 9021613816 (Dutch)
- Astrid Lindgren & Kristina Forslund (1990): Min ko vill ha roligt. Rabén & Sjögren, Stockholm, ISBN 9789129598148 (Swedish)
- Astrid Lindgren & Kristina Forslund (1991): Meine Kuh will auch Spass haben. Oetinger, Hamburg, ISBN 9783789141041 (German)
- Astrid Lindgren & Kristina Forslund (1991): Kua mi vil ha det gøy. Damm, ISBN 9788251777858 (Norwegian)
