= Egil Törnqvist =

Per Egil Törnqvist (19 December 1932, Uppsala – 9 March 2015, Amsterdam) was Professor of Scandinavian Studies at the University of Amsterdam and an academic literary critic.

Earlier (1961) he was in charge of the drama division in the comparative literature program at Uppsala University. From 1969 to 1997 he was professor of Scandinavian languages and literature at the University of Amsterdam. His daughter is artist Marit Törnqvist.

== Books ==
- (1968) "Drama of Souls: Studies in O'Neill's Super-naturalistic Technique."
- (1970) "Drama of Souls", ISBN 0-300-01152-0, Yale University Press
- (1982) "Strindbergian Drama"
- (1991) "Transposing Drama: Studies In Representation", ISBN 0-333-44063-3
- (1993) "Filmdiktaren Ingmar Bergman" ISBN 91-7843-050-X (in Swedish)
- (1995) "Ibsen: A Doll's House (Plays in Production)", ISBN 0-521-47866-9, Cambridge University Press
- (1999) "Ibsen, Strindberg and the Intimate Theater: Studies in TV Presentation"
- (2003) "Bergman's Muses: Aesthetic Versatility in Film, Theatre, Television and Radio" ISBN 0-7864-1603-3
- (2004) "Strindberg's Ghost Sonata"
- (2004) "Eugene O'Neill: A Playwright's Theatre"
- (2008) "I Bergmans regi", Amsterdam Contributions to Scandinavian Studies, Vol. 5
- (2008) (with Birgitta Steene) "Strindberg on Drama and Theatre"
- (2008) "Between Stage and Screen: Ingmar Bergman Directs", ISBN 90-5356-137-4, Amsterdam University Press
- (2018) (with Erik Mattsson), ”Strindberg’s Gustav Vasa and the Performance of Swedish Identity – from Celebration to Introspective Critique”, in Reconsidering National Plays in Europe. Springer International Publishing AG, 2018, ISBN 9783319753331
