= A Calf for Christmas =

1951 Swedish children's book

- First edition (Swedish)
- Author: Astrid Lindgren
- Original title: När Bäckhultarn for till stan
- Illustrator: Marit Törnqvist
- Language: Swedish
- Publisher: Rabén & Sjögren
- Publication date: 1951
- Publication place: Sweden
- English publication date: 1992

A Calf for Christmas (original title: När Bäckhultarn for till stan) is a children's book by Astrid Lindgren.

== Plot ==
Johann is sad because Embla, the cow of his family, has died. It was the only cow that the family had. Soon it will be Christmas, but without the cow and its milk, it is going to be a sad one.

Meanwhile, a rich farmer buys a calf in the town. Afterwards, he goes into a pub and gets drunk. On his way back to the farm, he falls asleep on the carriage, but his horse keeps running, it knows the way back. When the farmer wakes up, he hears a loud roar of the calf. He believes it is the devil and throws the calf out of the carriage. Then he continues his way home.

Johann discovers the calf in the snow and he is overjoyed. He believes that god has sent him this Christmas present and he can keep the calf, but his father says it may belong to someone and wants to find out to whom.

Johann and his father find out that the calf belongs to the rich farmer and visit him. The farmer realizes how important the calf is to Johann and he gives the calf to him. In return, Johann and his father should not tell how they got the calf. Johann is happy with this wonderful Christmas present.

== Background ==
A Calf for Christmas was based on a story that Astrid Lindgren was told by her father Samuel August Ericsson. He told Astrid Lindgren about a drunken barkeeper from Frödinge, who bought a calf from his brother. Ericsson helped the barkeeper to put the calf into a bag so the barkeeper was able to take it home with him on his carriage. Afterwards the barkeeper went to the pub and drank. On his way back, he did not remember buying a calf. When he suddenly heard a terrible roar from the calf, he believed that this was the devil and threw the calf off the wagon. This story was later told throughout the village. When Ericsson met the barkeeper again, he asked him mockingly, what had become of the calf. The barkeeper sensed that Ericsson knew about the story. He replied that this calf had made a long journey.

In Sweden, the story was first published in 1951 as När Bäckhultarn for till stan in the book En bil kommer lastad. Within the first month, the book had already sold more than 30,000 times.

The book has been translated into many languages, among them are English, German and Dutch. English edition has been illustrated by Marit Törnqvist.

== Reception ==
The German child and adolescent psychiatrist Michael Schulte-Markwort called A Calf for Christmas as one of the most beautiful stories for bereaved counsel and comfort.

Kirkus Reviews praised the well-told story, calling it a mix of satire and sober realism. The watercolors by Marit Törnqvist are beautiful and "a fine complement to this unusual glimpse of rural Sweden at the turn of the century".

Natalia Bragaru saif that A Calf for Christmas, like all Astrid Lindgren's books, has "multiple layers". It provides information about the harsh realities of the daily life on a farm in Sweden, telling of the gap between the poor and the rich, the traditions of the farmers, as well as of love, hope and the belief in miracles.

== See also ==
- List of Christmas-themed literature
