= Pomperipossa in Monismania =

1975 satirical story by Astrid Lindgren

"Pomperipossa in Monismania" (Swedish: Pomperipossa i Monismanien), also called "Pomperipossa in the World of Money", is a satirical story written by the Swedish children's book author Astrid Lindgren in response to the 102% marginal tax rate that she incurred in 1976. It was published starting on 3 March in the Stockholm evening tabloid Expressen and created a major debate about the Swedish tax system. The marginal tax rate above 100%, dubbed the "Pomperipossa effect", was due to tax legislation that required self-employed individuals to pay both regular income tax and employer's fees. Pomperipossa in Monismania was translated into English by Sarah Death and was published in the first issue of the magazine Swedish Book Review in 2002.

The story, a satirical allegory about a writer of children's books in a distant country, led to a stormy tax debate and is often attributed as a decisive factor in the defeat of the Swedish Social Democratic Party, for the first time in 40 years, in the elections later the same year. Publicly, Lindgren continued to support the party for all her life, but private letters reveal that she supported the opposition in the 1976 election and she feared that the Social Democratic Party after 44 years of consecutive rule was turning Sweden into a socialist dictatorship.

== See also ==
- Taxman – United Kingdom anti-tax song by the Beatles
