= Ilon Wikland =

Swedish artist

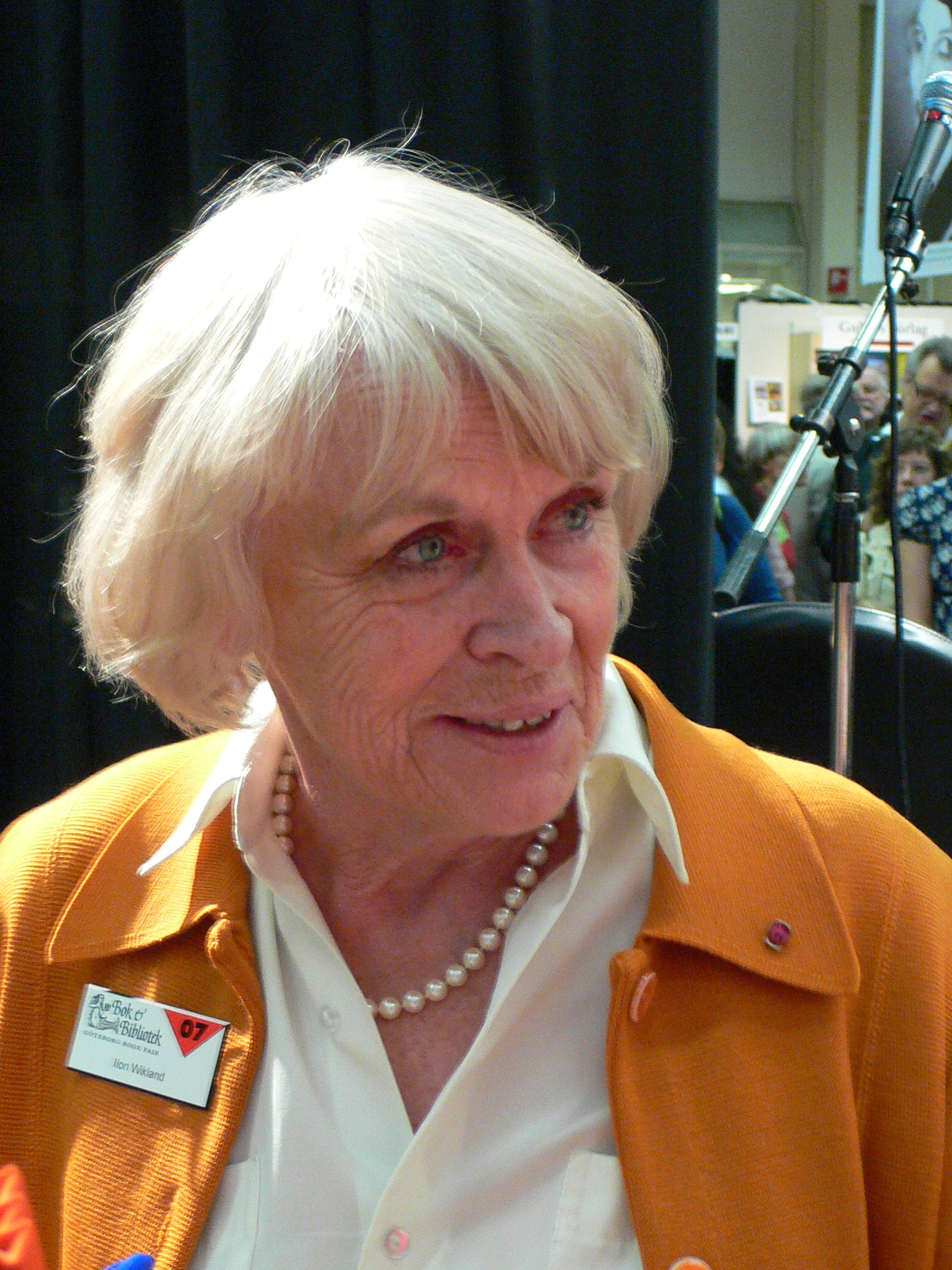
- Ilon Wikland in 2007.
- Born: Maire-Ilon Pääbo; February 5, 1930 (age 96); Haapsalu, Lääne County, Estonia
- Other name: Maire-Ilon Wikland
- Occupations: Artist, illustrator

Maire-Ilon Wikland (née Pääbo; born 5 February 1930) is an Estonian-born Swedish artist and illustrator.

== Biography ==
Wikland was born in Tartu, Estonia and raised in Haapsalu, Lääne County on Estonia's Baltic coast. In 1944 she escaped with the family of a classmate from the second Soviet occupation of Estonia, to Sweden, where she arrived as a refugee.

In 1953 Wikland applied for a job as an illustrator at Rabén & Sjögren. She was met by Astrid Lindgren, who had just finished writing the book Mio, my Son and who could see immediately that Wikland was able to "draw fairytales". Wikland did a test-drawing for the book and after that her collaboration with Lindgren continued. Wikland has said that Lindgren's writing continually makes her see inner pictures. She also derives inspiration for her pictures from real life. In the same way that Lindgren wrote for "the child within her", Wikland often also draws for the child within her.

Wikland is the artist who has illustrated the greatest number of Lindgren's books:

- The Six Bullerby Children (a.k.a. The Children of Noisy Village)
- The Children on Troublemaker Street
- The Brothers Lionheart
- Karlsson-on-the-Roof
- Mardie
- Mio, My Son
- Simon Small Moves In
- Ronia the Robber's Daughter
- Seacrow Island
- The Ghost of Skinny Jack
- The Red Bird.

She has also provided the illustrations for many picture books by Lindgren and many other writers, including The Dragon with Red Eyes, I Want a Brother or Sister, That’s My Baby, Brenda Helps Grandmother, Simon Small Moves in, and The Borrowers.

In 2004 Wikland decided to gift her original illustrations to Estonia. The artwork was originally exhibited in Wikland's gallery in Haapsalu, Estonia. In 2009 "Ilon's Wonderland", a gallery and theme centre for children and families based on her works and illustrations, was opened in Haapsalu.

== Awards ==
Wikland was awarded the Illis quorum by the government of Sweden in 2002 for her "outstanding ability to bring environments and characters to life from her own and Astrid Lindgren's writings".
