= Vimmerby =

Place in Småland, Sweden

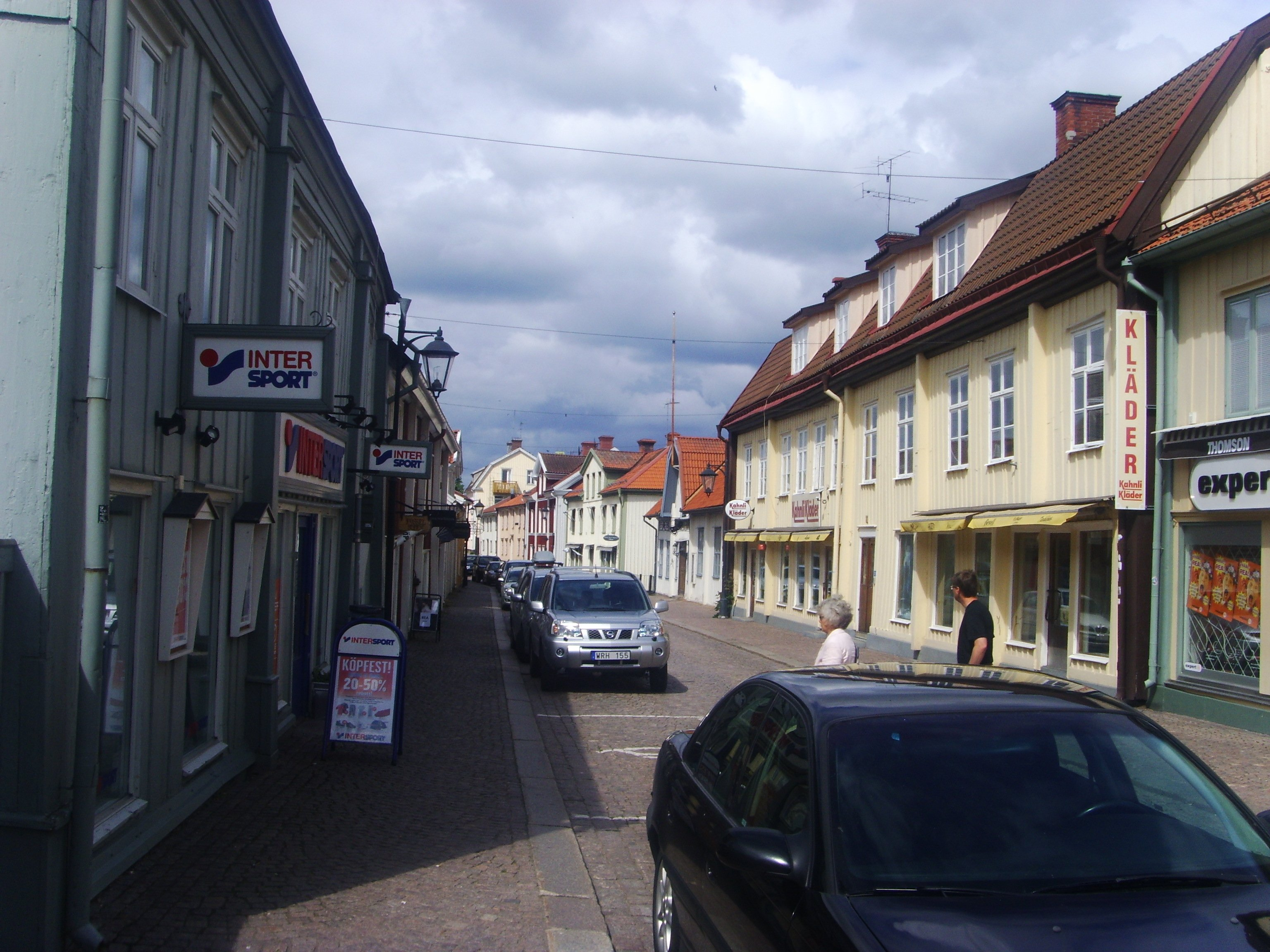
- Vimmerby in June 2008

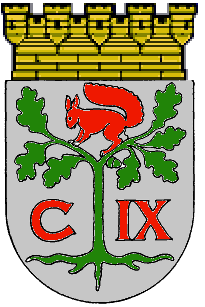
- Coat of arms

- Location within Kalmar Location within Sweden
- Coordinates: 57°40′N 15°51′E
- Country: Sweden
- Province: Småland
- County: Kalmar County
- Municipality: Vimmerby Municipality
- Charter: 14th century

Area
  - Total: 7.56 km^{2} (2.92 sq mi)

Population (31 December 2010)
  - Total: 10,934
  - Density: 1,050/km^{2} (2,700/sq mi)
- Time zone: UTC+1 (CET)
  - Summer (DST): UTC+2 (CEST)
- Climate: Cfb

Vimmerby is a city and the seat of Vimmerby Municipality, Kalmar County, Sweden with 10,934 inhabitants in 2010.

== Overview ==
Stångån is a small river running through the city.

Vimmerby had its charter as early as the fourteenth century. The main street, Storgatan, still has the shape in which it was built in the medieval time. There are also many old wooden houses in the city.

Vimmerby is currently a tourist attraction due to historical links with Swedish author Astrid Lindgren (1907–2002). The Astrid Lindgren's World is a theme park for children that has themes from her books and is visited by fans from around the world. When Astrid Lindgren wrote her books about the country boy Emil of Lönneberga she used much information from her own upbringing in the rural areas of Vimmerby.

Another well-known person from Vimmerby is Swedish record international goalkeeper Thomas Ravelli.

Gosta Holmer, A Decathlete, is also from Vimmerby

== Vimmerby Church ==
Vimmerby Church (Vimmerby kyrka) was built in 1854-1855. The church is built in a neoclassical style with a church tower to the west. The baptismal font is carved in granite and dates from around the year 1200. The pulpit was made in 1713 by the sculptor Olof Jonasson Wiström (1666- 1720). The altarpiece was added in 1877 and was painted by artist Sven Alfred Thörne (1850-1916).

== Gallery ==
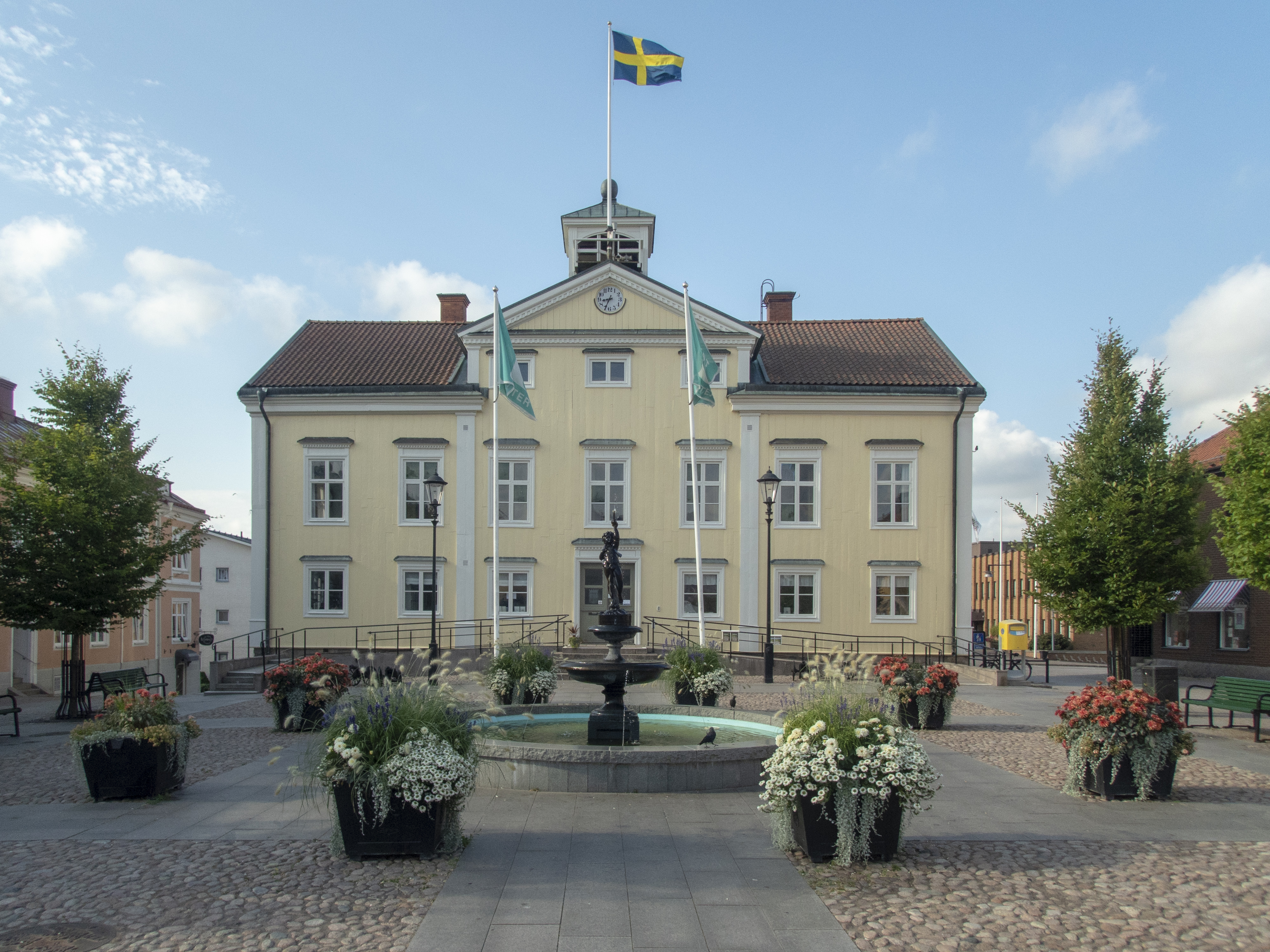
City Hall

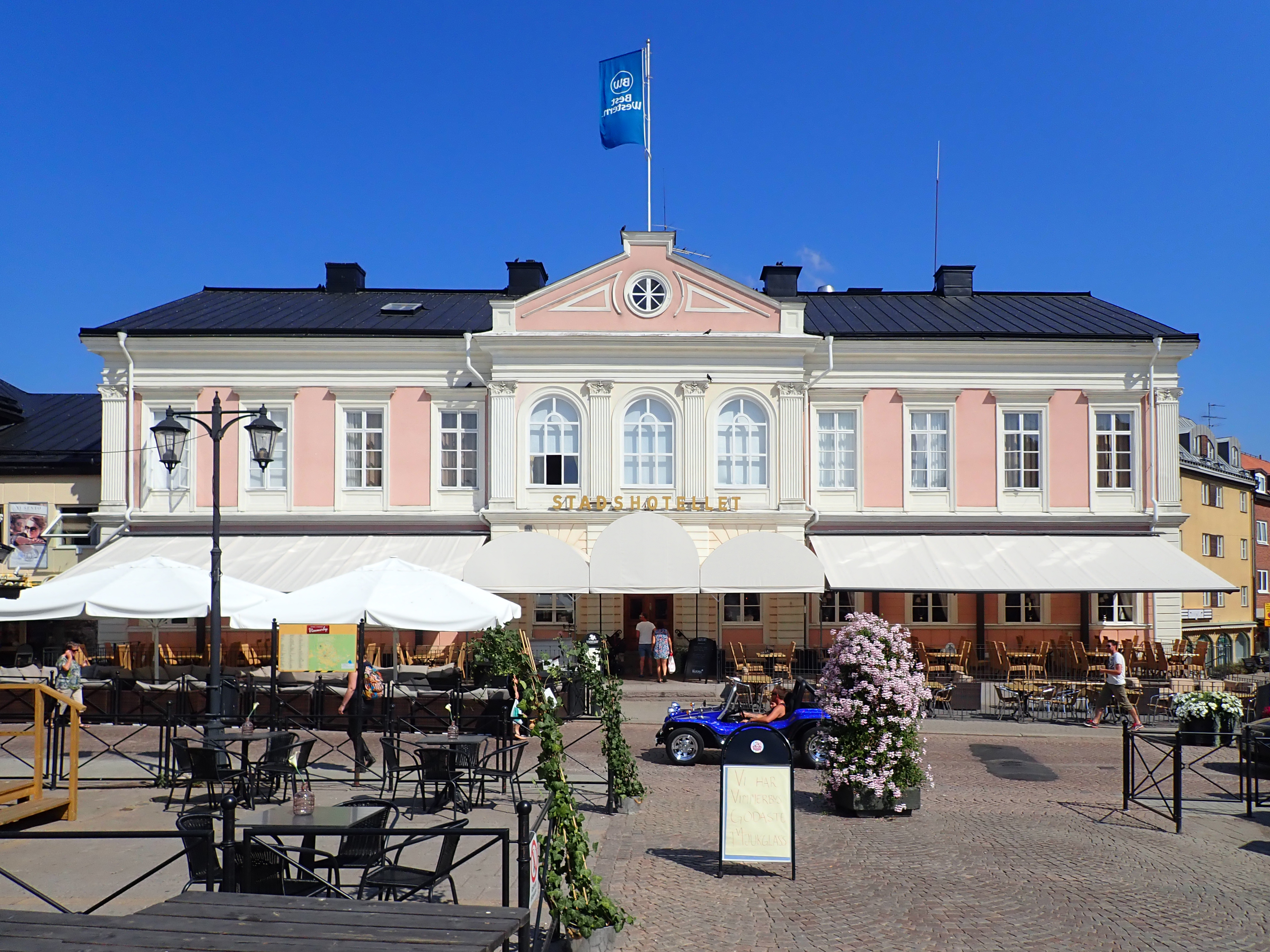
Vimmerby Stadshotell

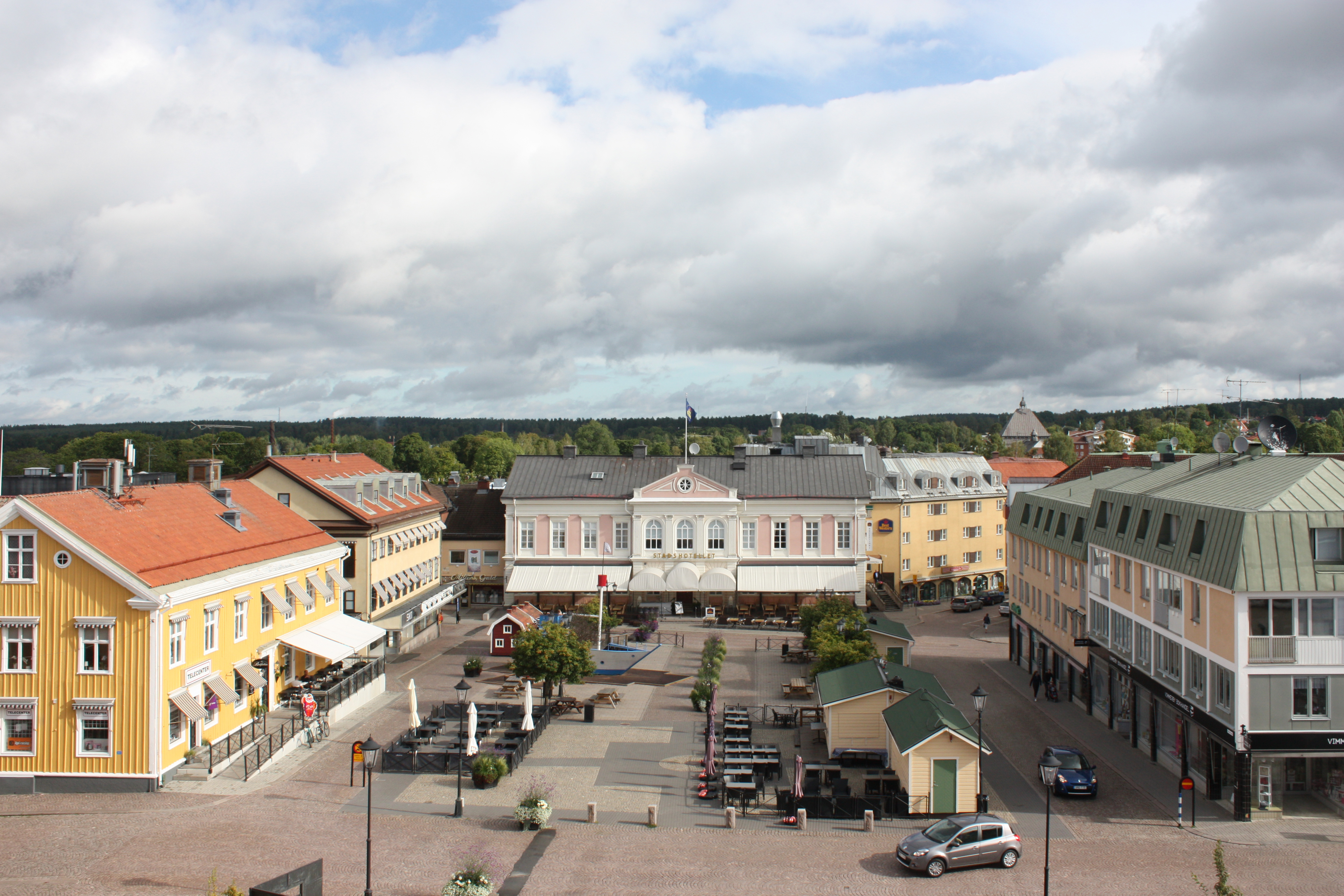
Stora torget

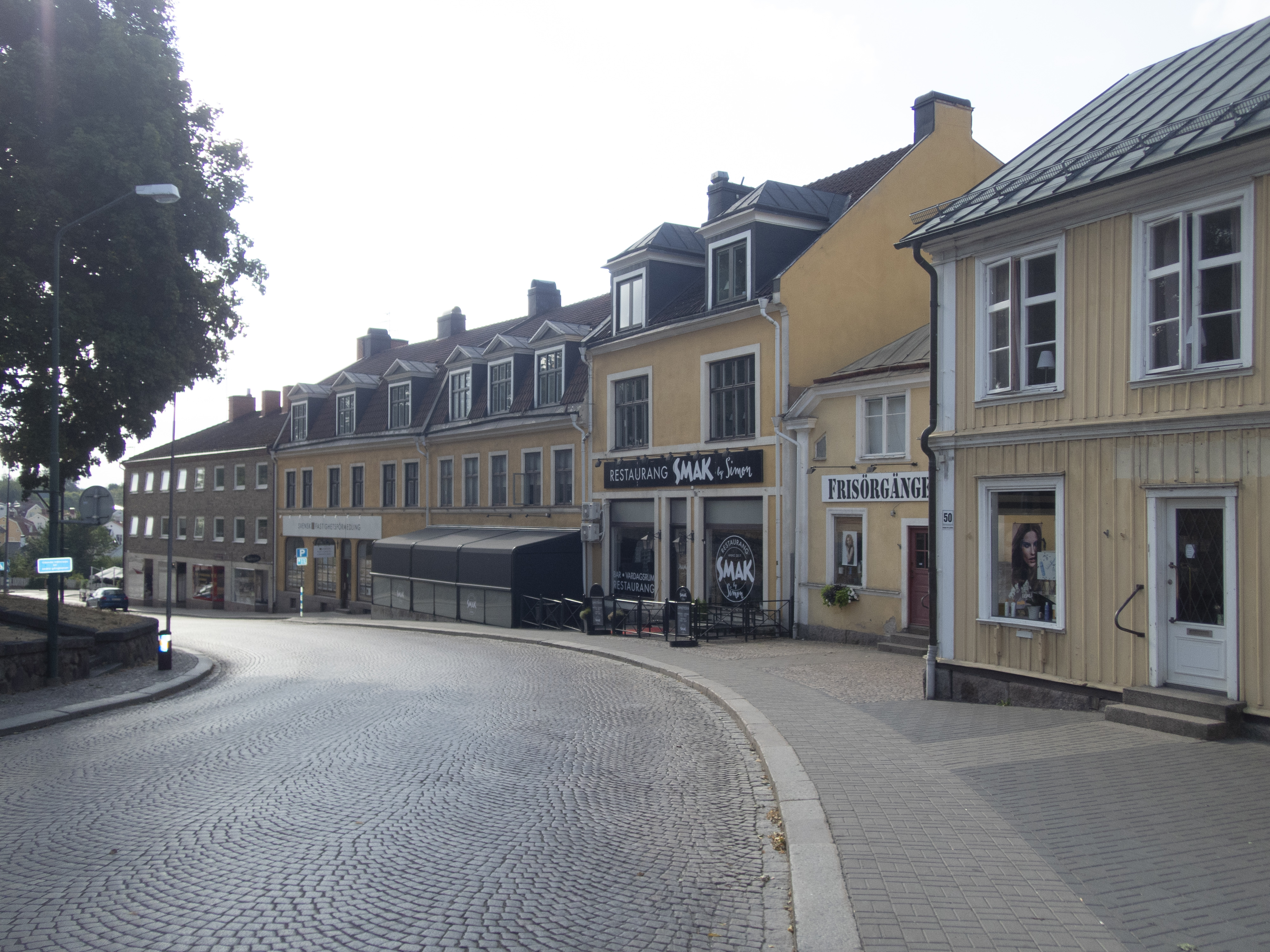
Storgatan

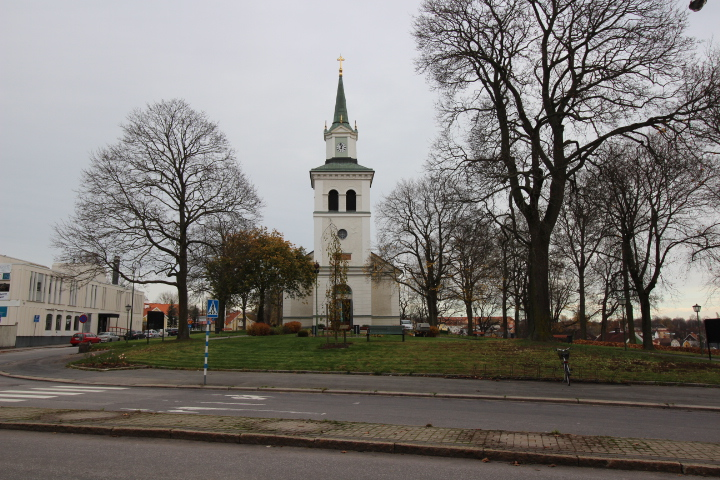
Vimmerby Church

== Sports ==
The following sports clubs are located in Vimmerby:

- Vimmerby IF

== Twin towns — sister cities ==
The following cities are twinned with Vimmerby:

- Fargo, North Dakota, United States
- Joniškis, Lithuania
