= Anna Wikland =

Swedish business executive

- Education: California Lutheran University
- Occupation: Business Executive
- Years active: 2006–present
- Known for: Country Director at Google Sweden
- Notable work: Google's expansion in Sweden
- Title: CEO of Keybroker (2006–2014), Country Director of Google Sweden (2016–present)

Anna Wikland is a Swedish business executive.

== Early life and education ==
Wikland played and coached elite-level handball for many years. She studied at California Lutheran University.

== Career ==
From 2006 to 2014, Wikland worked for digital marketing startup Keybroker, eventually becoming CEO. In 2014, she joined Google and in April 2016, she became Google's Country Director for Sweden.

Wikland was named one of Sweden's most powerful women in tech in 2017 by Business Insider.
