= Astrid Lindgren's World =

Theme park in Vimmerby, Sweden

Coordinates: 57.6745°N 15.8435°E

- Previously known as Sagobyn
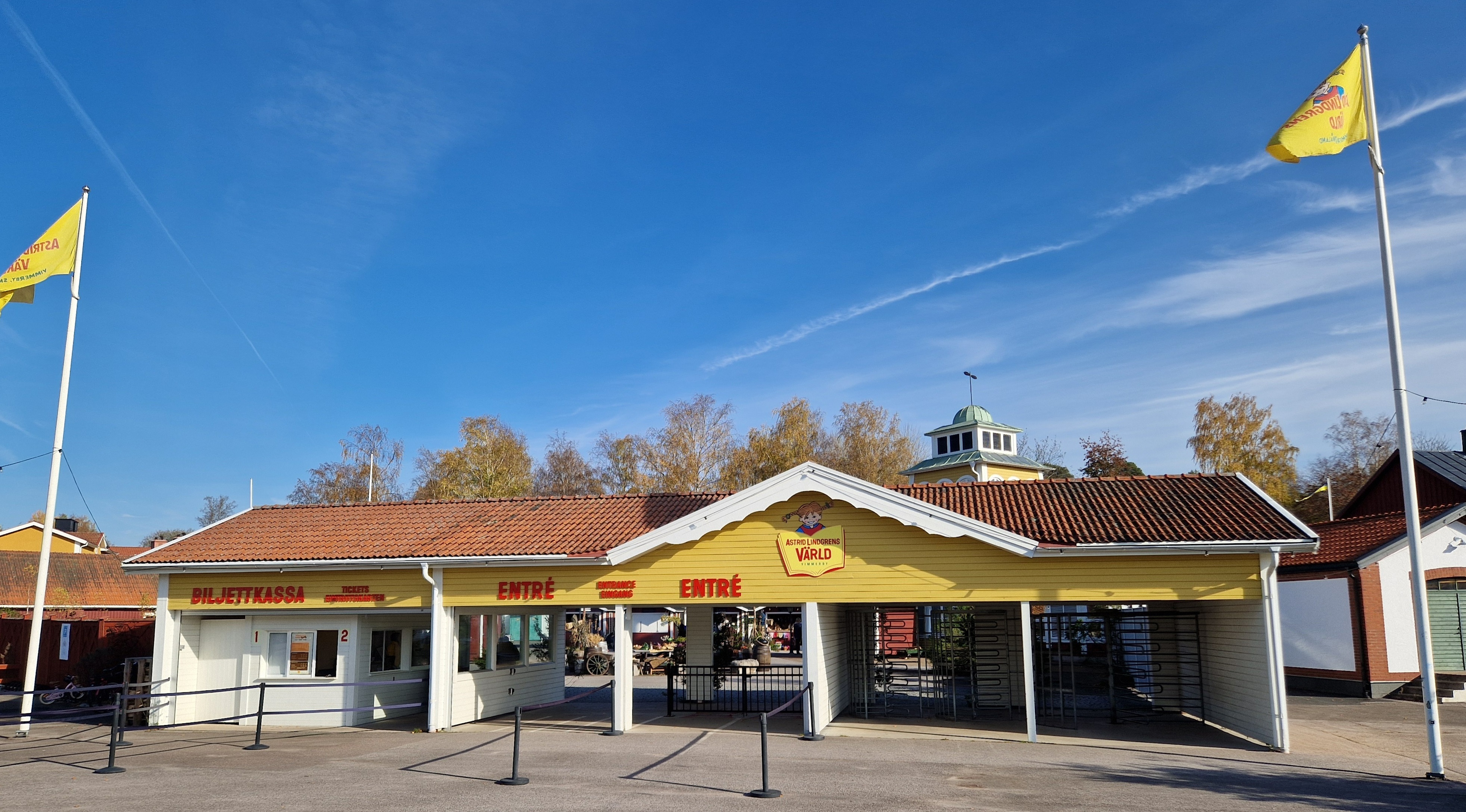
- Astrid Lindgren's World entrance
- Interactive map of Astrid Lindgren's World
- Location: Vimmerby, Sweden
- Opened: 1981
- Website: astridlindgrensvarld.se

Astrid Lindgren's World (Swedish: Astrid Lindgrens värld) is a theme park located in Astrid Lindgren's native city of Vimmerby, Sweden.

It was opened in 1981 as a Fairytale Village (Sagobyn). In 1981, they built Katthult, the first house together on a 1:3 scale. Over the years, more settings were added and all built on a 1:3 scale.

In its 180,000 square metres, visitors meet all characters from books by Astrid Lindgren. All the environments are built as prescribed in the books and they give child visitors the possibility to enter into the stories of Pippi Longstocking, Emil i Lönneberga, Karlsson-on-the-Roof, and many others of Astrid Lindgren's beloved characters.

Astrid Lindgren's World is open in the summer from May to August. During the summer season events go on all day long, both on stage and improvised all around the park. The small stage just inside the entrance and the main stage shows every day specially written scenes with music that includes singing and dancing. There are various performances by the characters including Pippi at her home, Villa Villekulla.

Meeting with the environments and the interaction with the well-known characters form an important part of the offering. Besides the theme park, Astrid Lindgren's World also offers its visitors many different types of lodging options and a wide selection of places for picnics, coffeehouse and restaurant visits.

== Gallery ==
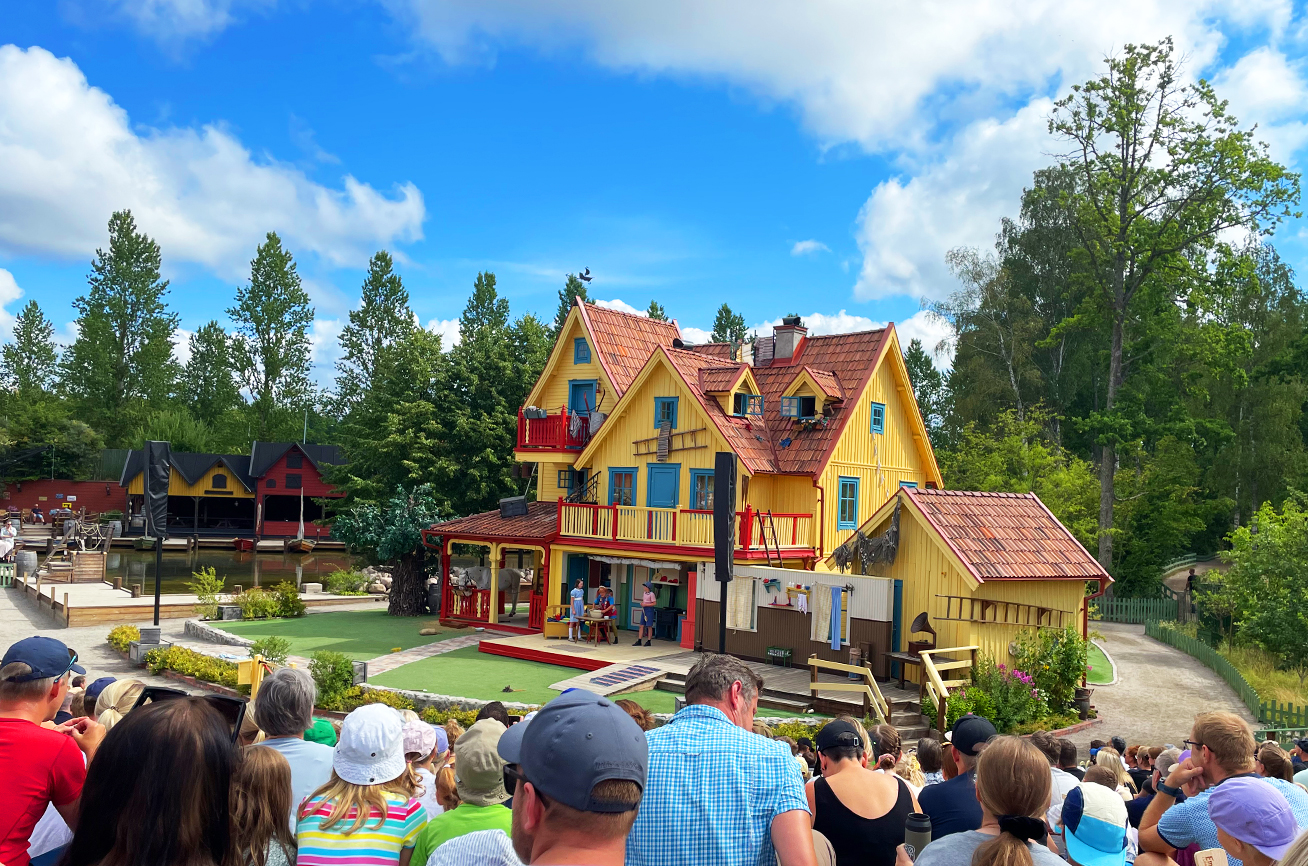
Villa Villekulla

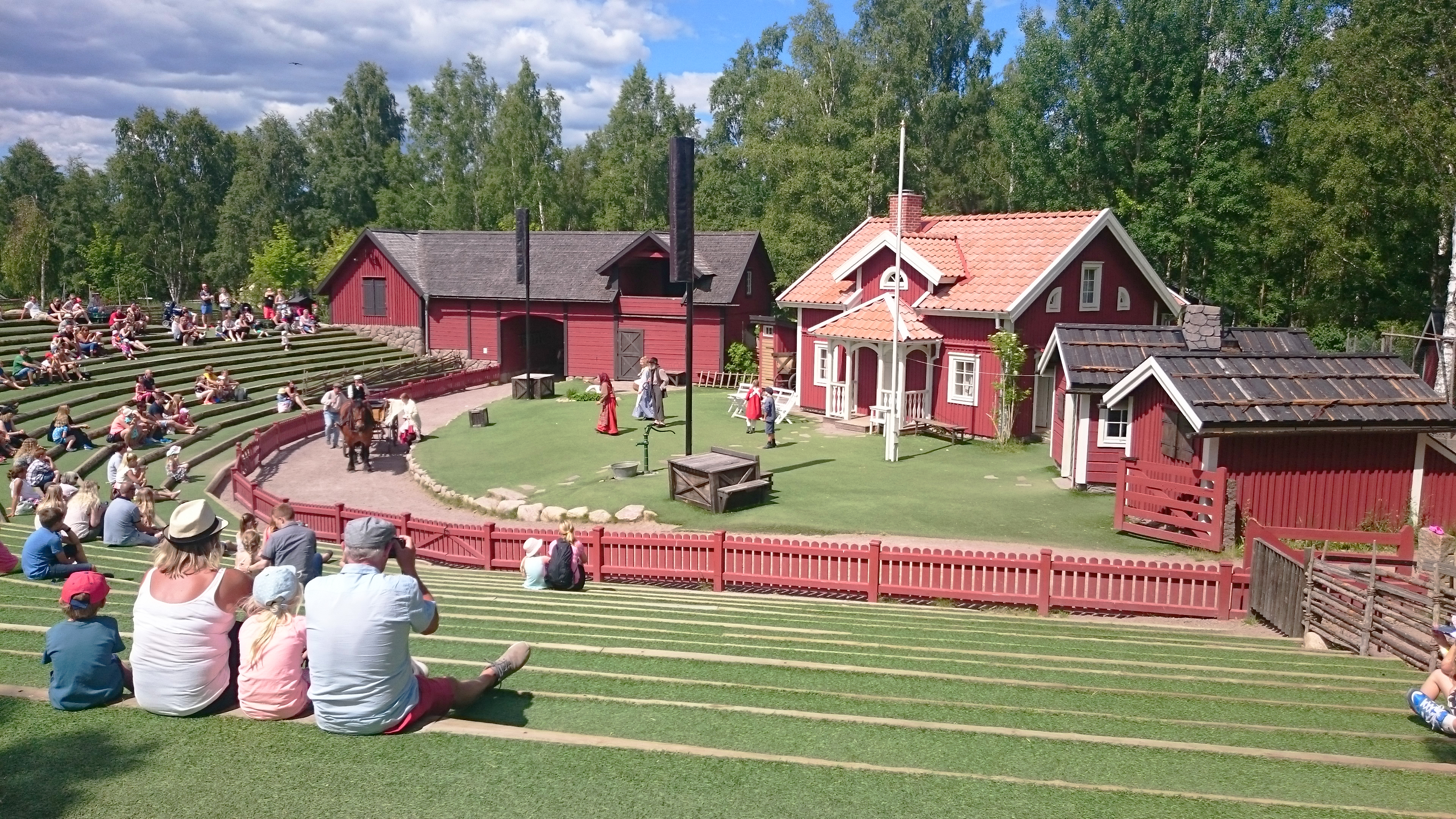
Katthult

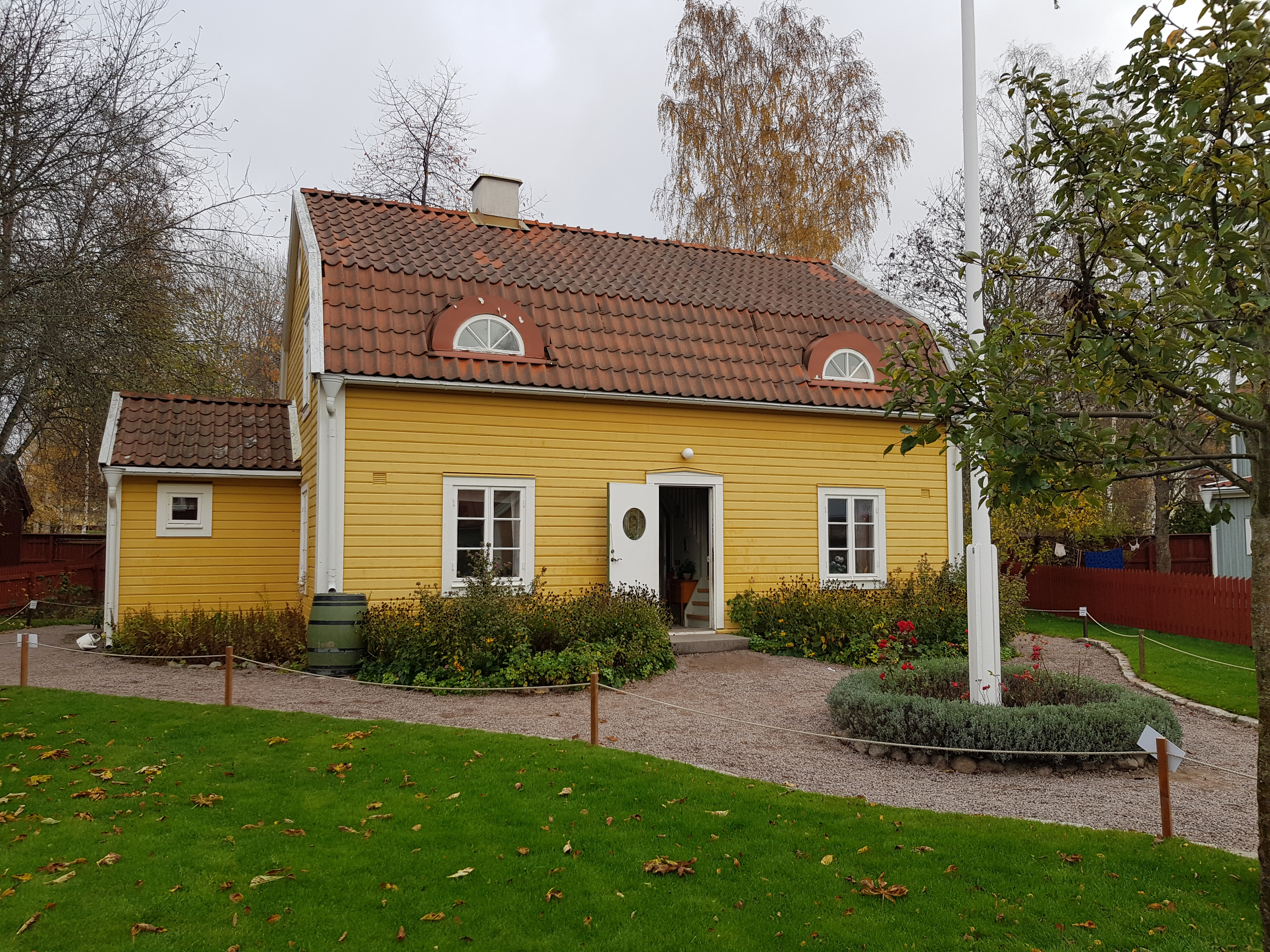
Lotta's house
