= Royal Automobile Club (Sweden) =

Swedish organization

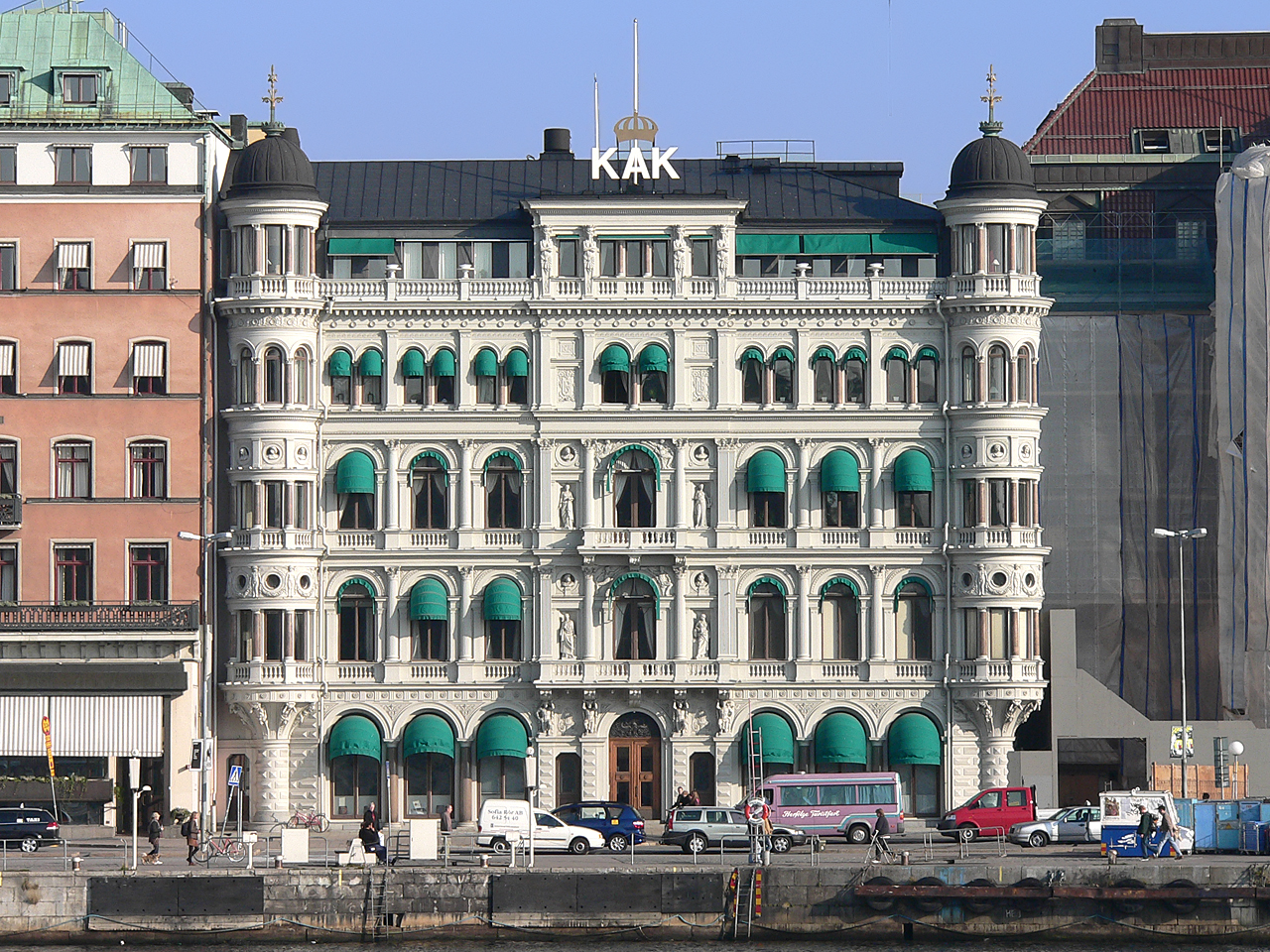
Bolinder palace with KAK logo

The Royal Automobile Club (Swedish: Kungliga Automobilklubben, KAK), established in 1903, is an association for Swedish car owners which is aimed at safeguarding their interests e.g. by promoting a healthy use of car-based mobility, developing views on traffic matters and influencing decisiontakers and public opinion, as well as organising car racing contests and offering special benefits to its members.

KAK is well known in Stockholm for the logo it displays on the roof of Bolinder Palace Hotel on Stockholm's Blasieholmen peninsula, where it also holds office.
