= Astrid Lindgren =

Swedish author and screenwriter (1907–2002)

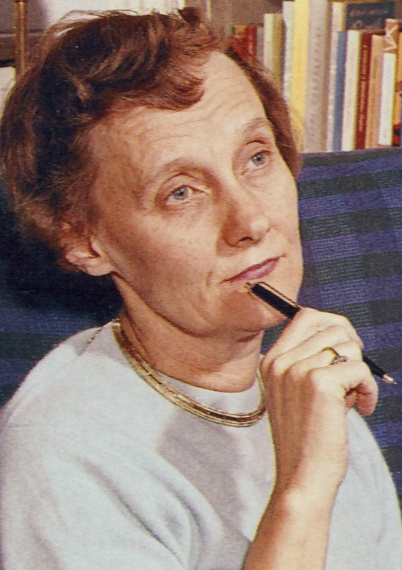
- Lindgren c. 1960
- Born: Astrid Anna Emilia Ericsson; 14 November 1907; Vimmerby, Sweden
- Died: 28 January 2002 (aged 94); Stockholm, Sweden
- Resting place: Vimmerby, Sweden
- Occupation: Book writer
- Writing career
- Period: 1944–2002
- Genres: Children's fiction; picture books; screenplays
- Notable awards: Hans Christian Andersen Award for Writing 1958; Right Livelihood Award 1994

Astrid Anna Emilia Lindgren (Swedish: [ˈǎsːtrɪd ˈlɪ̂nːˌɡreːn]; née Ericsson; 14 November 1907 – 28 January 2002) was a Swedish writer of fiction and screenplays. She is most notable for several children's book series, featuring Pippi Longstocking, Emil of Lönneberga, Karlsson-on-the-Roof, and The Six Bullerby Children, (Children of Noisy Village in the US), and for the children's fantasy novels Mio, My Son; Ronia the Robber's Daughter; The Brothers Lionheart and Nils Karlsson Pyssling. Lindgren worked on the Children's Literature Editorial Board at the Rabén & Sjögren publishing house in Stockholm and wrote more than 30 books for children. In 2017, she was calculated to be the world's 18th most translated author. Lindgren had by 2010 sold roughly 167 million books worldwide. In 1994, she was awarded the Right Livelihood Award for "her unique authorship dedicated to the rights of children and respect for their individuality". Her campaigning for animal welfare led to a new law, Lex Lindgren, in time for her 80th birthday.

== Biography ==
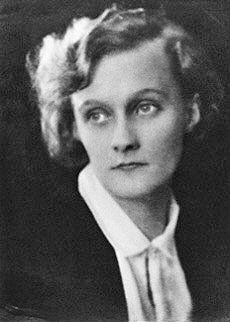
Lindgren in 1924

Astrid Lindgren was born on 14 November 1907. She grew up in Näs, near Vimmerby, Småland, Sweden. She was the daughter of Samuel August Ericsson and Johanna (Hanna) Sofia Jonsson. Lindgren had an older brother and two younger sisters; the brother Gunnar became a member of the Swedish parliament.

Upon finishing school, Lindgren took a job with the local newspaper, Vimmerby Tidning, in Vimmerby. She had a relationship with the chief editor and became pregnant, causing a local scandal. She moved to the capital city of Stockholm and learnt the skills of a secretary. While there in 1926 she gave birth to her only son, Lars, who was fostered for four years and then returned to her. He died in 1986.

Starting in 1928, Lindgren worked as a secretary at Sweden's Royal Automobile Club (Kungliga Automobil Klubben). In 1931, she married her boss, Sture Lindgren (1898–1952). In 1934, Lindgren gave birth to her second child, Karin.

Lindgren died in her home in central Stockholm on 28 January 2002 at the age of 94. Her funeral took place in Storkyrkan in Gamla stan. Among those attending were King Carl XVI Gustaf with Queen Silvia and others of the royal family, and Prime Minister Göran Persson. The ceremony was described in Dagens Nyheter as "the closest you can get to a state funeral."

== Career ==
As the children were sitting there eating pears, a girl came walking along the road from town. When she saw the children she stopped and asked, "Have you seen my papa go by?"
"M-m-m," said Pippi. "How did he look? Did he have blue eyes?"
"Yes," said the girl.
"Medium large, not too tall and not too short?"
"Yes," said the girl.
"Black hat and black shoes?"
"Yes, exactly," said the girl eagerly.
"No, that one we haven't seen," said Pippi decidedly.

— Astrid Lindgren, Pippi Longstocking (Pippi Långstrump, 1945)

Lindgren worked as a journalist and secretary before becoming a full-time author. She served as a secretary for the 1933 Swedish Summer Grand Prix. In the early 1940s, she worked as a secretary for criminalist Harry Söderman; the Norsk biografisk leksikon cites this experience as an inspiration for her fictional detective Bill Bergson.

In 1944, Lindgren won second prize in a competition held by the book publishing company Rabén & Sjögren, with the novel Britt-Marie lättar sitt hjärta (The Confidences of Britt-Marie). In 1945 she won first prize in the same competition with the chapter book Pippi Långstrump (Pippi Longstocking), which had been rejected by the book publishing company Bonniers. (Rabén & Sjögren published it with illustrations by Ingrid Vang Nyman, the latter's debut in Sweden.) Since then it has become one of the most beloved children's books in the world and has been translated into at least 100 languages. While Lindgren almost immediately became a much-appreciated writer, the irreverent attitude towards adult authority that distinguishes many of her characters has occasionally drawn the ire of conservatives.

She travelled to America and wrote what became the 1950 book Kati in America as a series of short pieces for the Swedish women's magazine Damernas Värld. In 1956, the inaugural year of the Deutscher Jugendliteraturpreis, the German-language edition of Mio, min Mio (Mio, My Son) won the Children's Book Award. (Note: Sixteen books written by Lindgren made the Children's Book and Picture Book longlist between 1956 and 1975, but only Mio, My Son won a prize in its category.)

In 1958, Lindgren received the second Hans Christian Andersen Medal for Rasmus på luffen (Rasmus and the Vagabond), a 1956 novel developed from her screenplay and filmed in 1955. The biennial International Board on Books for Young People, now considered the highest lifetime recognition available to creators of children's books, soon came to be called the Little Nobel Prize. In her career, she wrote more than 30 books for children. In 2017, she was calculated to be the world's 18th most translated author. By 2010, she had sold roughly 167 million books worldwide.

== Politics ==
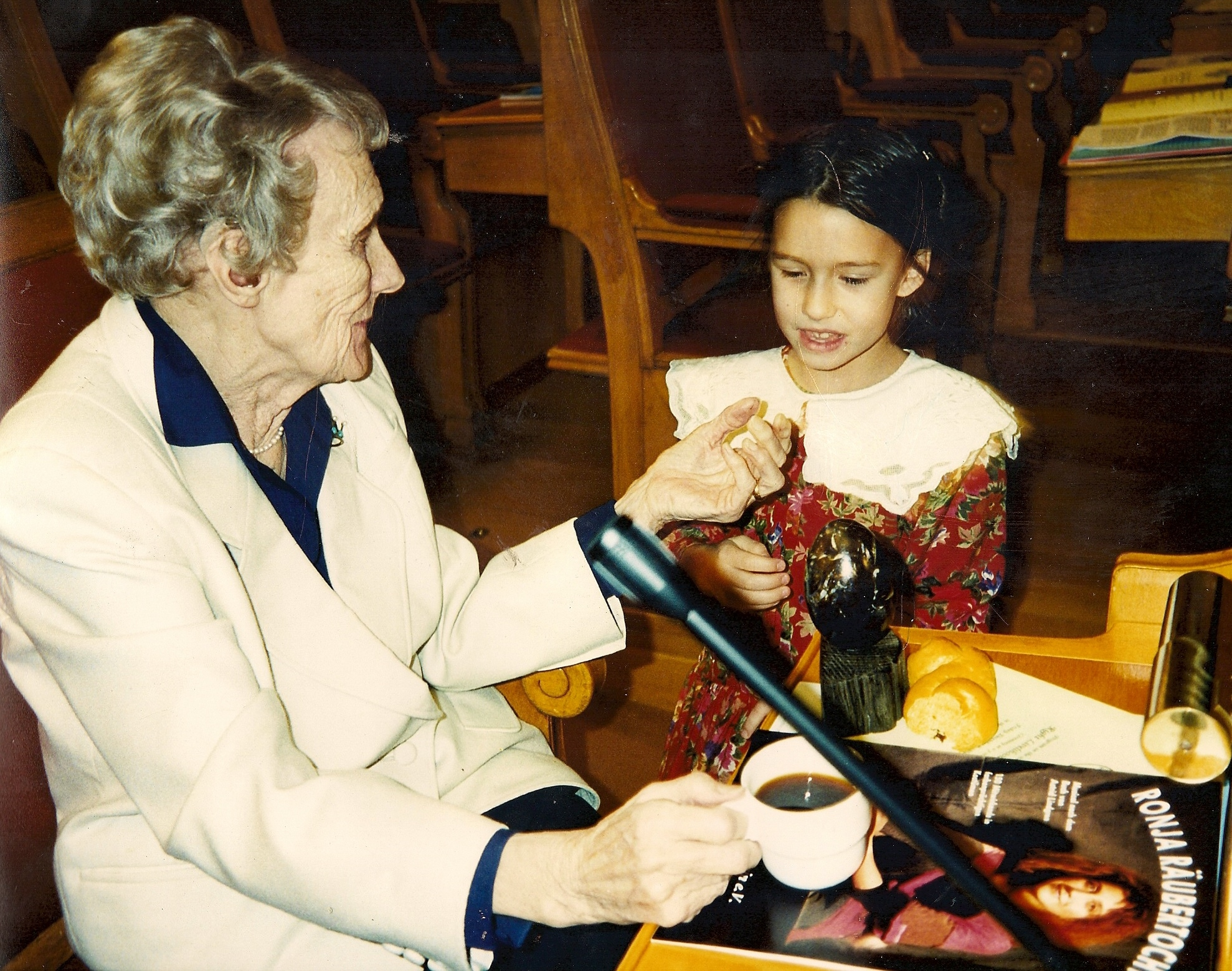
Lindgren receiving the Right Livelihood Award in the Swedish parliament, 1994

In 1976, a scandal arose in Sweden when it was publicised that Lindgren's marginal tax rate had risen to 102 per cent. This was to be known as the "Pomperipossa effect", from a story she published in Expressen on 3 March 1976, titled Pomperipossa in Monismania, attacking the government and its taxation policies. It was a satirical allegory in response to the marginal tax rate Lindgren had incurred in 1976, which required self-employed individuals to pay both regular income tax and employers' deductions. In a stormy tax debate, she attracted criticism from Social Democrats and others. She responded by raising the issue of the lack of women involved in the Social Democrats' campaign. In that year's general election, the Social Democratic government was voted out for the first time in 44 years, and the Lindgren tax debate was one of several controversies that may have contributed to that result. Another controversy involved Ingmar Bergman's farewell letter to Sweden after charges had been made against him of tax evasion. Lindgren nevertheless remained a Social Democrat for the rest of her life.

Astrid Lindgren maintained a very firm and critical stance regarding Disney adaptations, categorically refusing to let her works, especially her iconic creation Pippi Longstocking, fall into the hands of the American giant. The Swedish author championed a vision of childhood rooted in freedom, the genuine empowerment of children, and the absence of sexism. For this reason, she consistently opposed the model of entertainment represented by Disney.

In 1978, when she received the Peace Prize of the German Book Trade, Lindgren spoke against corporal punishment of children in a speech entitled Never Violence! After that, she teamed up with scientists, journalists and politicians to promote non-violent upbringing. In 1979, a law was introduced in Sweden prohibiting violence against children in response to her demands.

From 1985 to 1989, Lindgren, with veterinarian Kristina Forslund, wrote articles concerning animal protection and mass production in the Swedish newspapers Expressen and Dagens Nyheter. They wanted to launch an awareness campaign to promote better animal treatment in factory farming. Eventually, their activities led to a new law, dubbed the Lex Lindgren, which was presented to Lindgren on her 80th birthday. At that time it was the strictest law concerning animal welfare in the world. However, Lindgren and Forslund were unsatisfied with it. Not enough had been done and only minor changes occurred. The articles Forslund and Lindgren wrote were later published in the book Min ko vill ha roligt (My cow wants to have fun).

Lindgren was well known both for her support for children's and animal rights and for her opposition to corporal punishment and the EU. In 1994, she received the Right Livelihood Award, "For her commitment to justice, non-violence and understanding of minorities as well as her love and caring for nature." She was a member of the freedom of speech-promoting, anti-imperialist organization Folket i Bild/Kulturfront.

== Honours and memorials ==
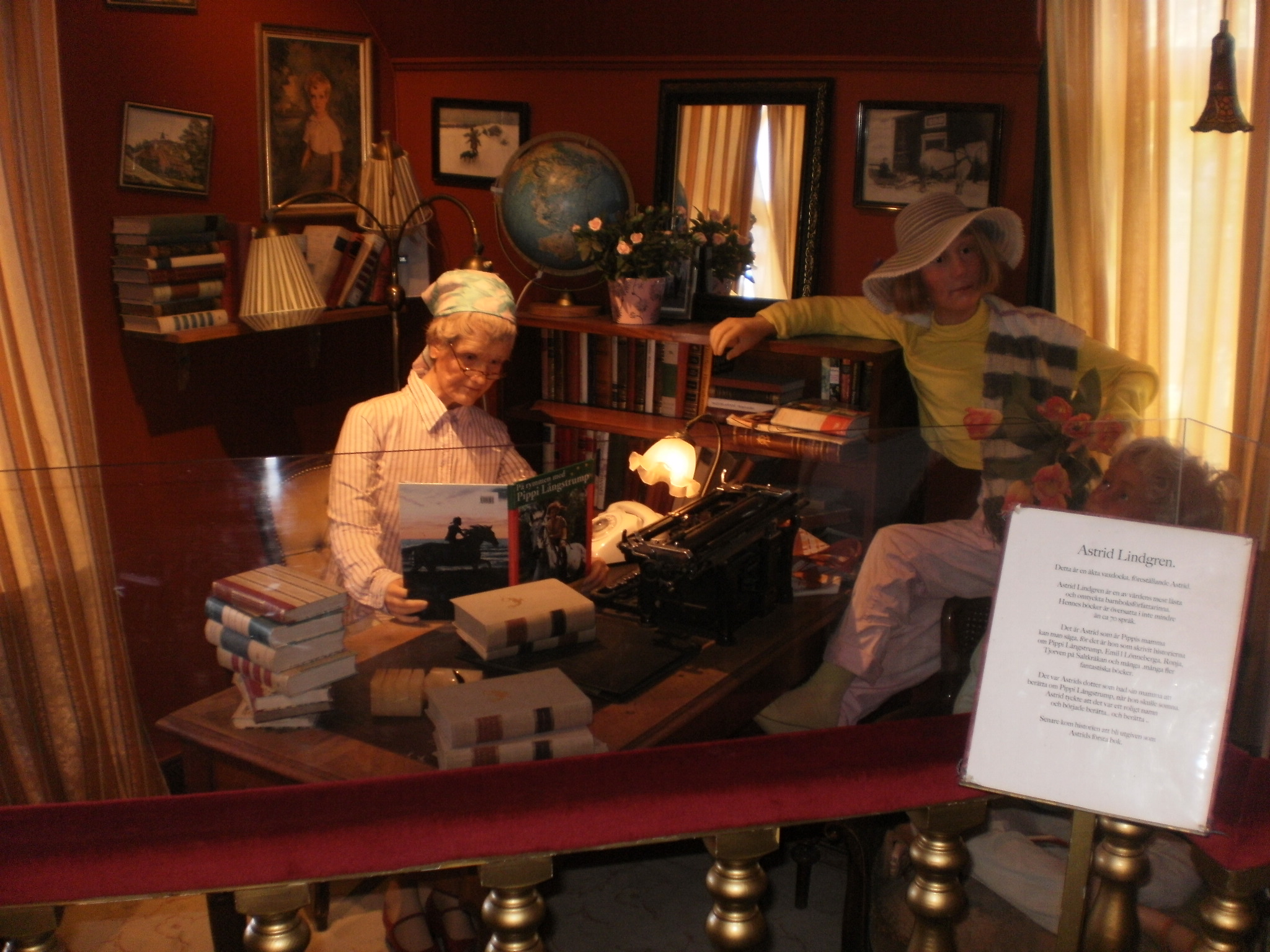
Lindgren represented in the Villa Villekulla exhibit at Kneippbyn in Visby, 2011

In 1967, the publisher Rabén & Sjögren established an annual literary prize, the Astrid Lindgren Prize, to mark her 60th birthday. The prize—40,000 Swedish kronor—is awarded to a Swedish-language children's writer every year on Lindgren's birthday in November. In 1995, she was awarded the Illis quorum gold medal by the Swedish government. On her 90th birthday, she was pronounced International Swede of the Year 1997. In its entry on Scandinavian fantasy, The Encyclopedia of Fantasy named Lindgren the foremost Swedish contributor to modern children's fantasy. Its entry on Lindgren stated that "Her niche in children's fantasy remains both secure and exalted. Her stories and images can never be forgotten."

Following Lindgren's death, the government of Sweden instituted the Astrid Lindgren Memorial Award in her memory. The award is the world's largest monetary award for children's and youth literature, in the amount of five million Swedish kronor. The collection of Lindgren's original manuscripts in the National Library of Sweden in Stockholm was added to UNESCO's Memory of the World International Register in 2005. On 6 April 2011, Sweden's central bank Sveriges Riksbank announced that Lindgren's portrait would feature on the 20 kronor banknote, beginning in 2014–2015. The banknote had before that featured the Swedish author Selma Lagerlöf. In 2018, Pernille Fischer Christensen directed the film Becoming Astrid (Swedish: Unga Astrid), a biographical drama about Lindgren's early life.

=== Nobel Prize in Literature ===
In 1972, Lindgren was nominated for the Nobel Prize in Literature by German literary critic Klaus Doderer and Austrian librarian Josef Stummvoll.

=== Asteroid Lindgren ===
Asteroid 3204 Lindgren, discovered in 1978 by Soviet astronomer Nikolai Chernykh, was named after her. The name of the Swedish microsatellite Astrid 1, launched on 24 January 1995, was originally selected only as a common Swedish female name, but within a short time it was decided to name the payload instruments after characters in Lindgren's books: PIPPI (Prelude in Planetary Particle Imaging), EMIL (Electron Measurements – In-situ and Lightweight), and MIO (Miniature Imaging Optics).

=== Astrid's Wellspring ===
In memory of Lindgren, a memorial sculpture was created next to her childhood home, named Källa Astrid ("Astrid's Wellspring" in English). It is situated at the spot where Lindgren first heard fairy tales. The sculpture consists of an artistic representation of a young person's head (1.37 m high), flattened on top, in the corner of a square pond, and, just above the water, a ring of rosehip thorns.

Lindgren's childhood home is near the statue and open to the public. Just 100 metres (330 ft) from Astrid's Wellspring is a museum in her memory. The author is buried in Vimmerby, where the Astrid Lindgren's World theme park is located. The children's museum Junibacken, in Stockholm, was opened in June 1996 with the main theme of the permanent exhibition being devoted to Lindgren; at the heart of the museum is a theme train ride through the world of Lindgren's novels.

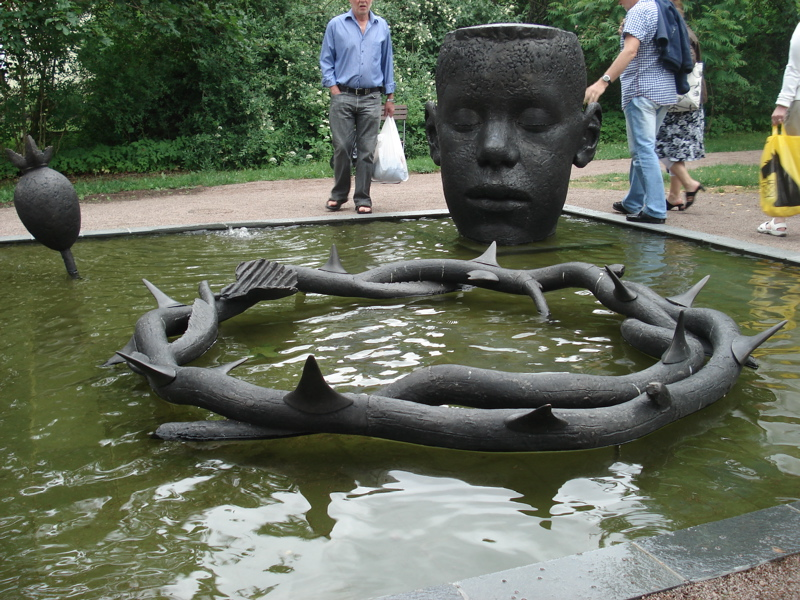
Källa Astrid (Astrid's Wellspring) by Berit Lindfeldt

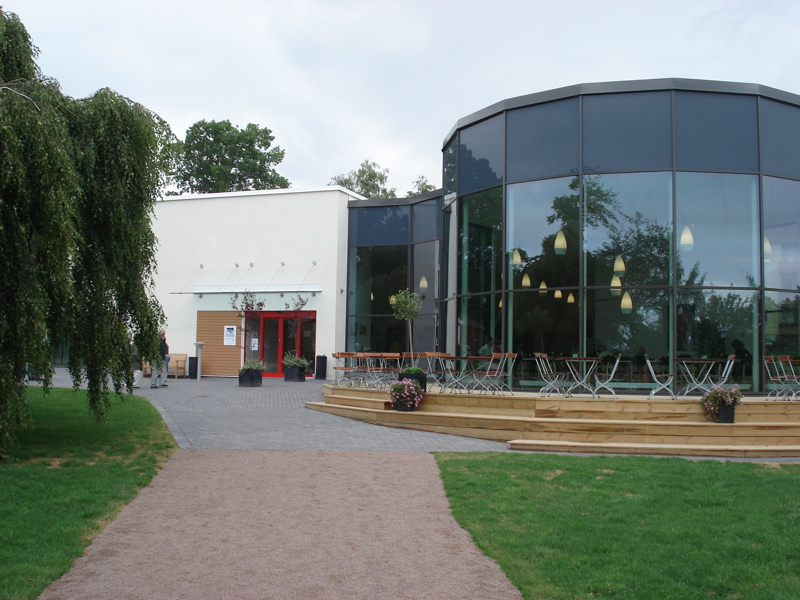
Lindgren Museum

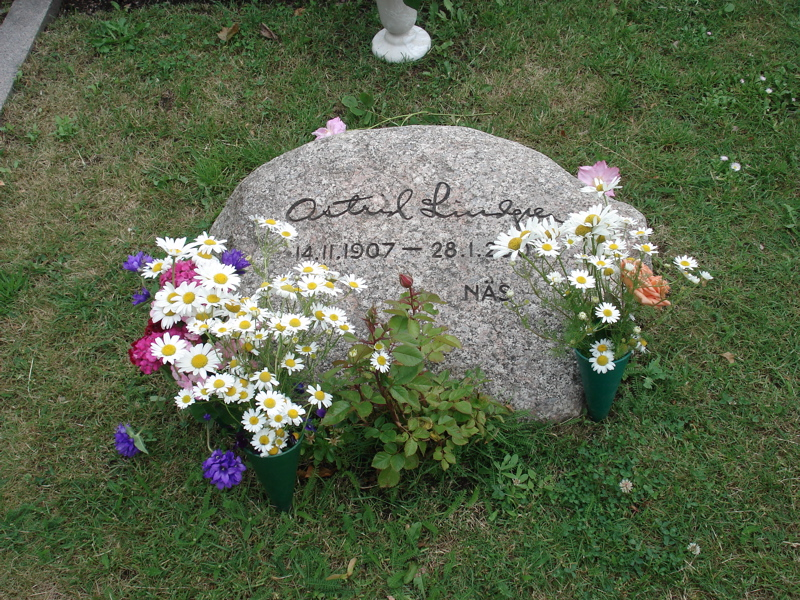
Lindgren gravesite

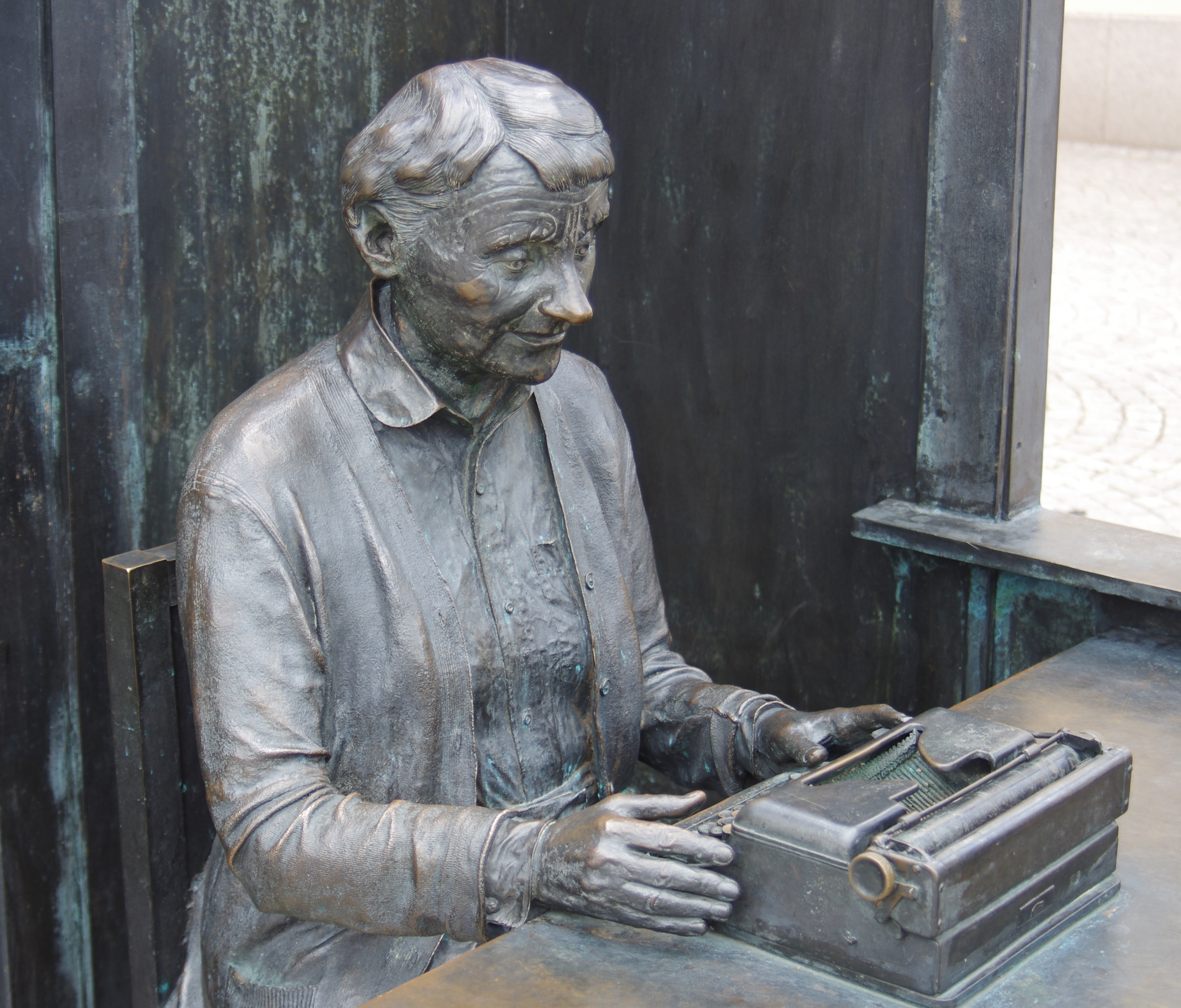
Lindgren at her typewriter. Statue created by Marie-Louise Ekman, in the centre of Vimmerby

== Works ==
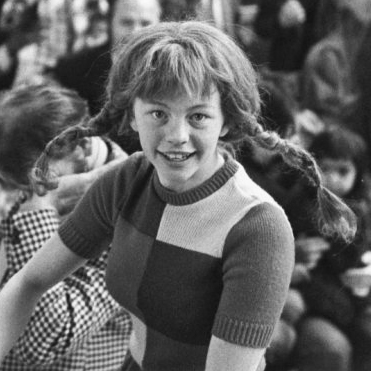
The Lindgren character Pippi Longstocking played by Inger Nilsson in 1972

=== Bibliography ===
Lindgren is best known for her children's book series featuring Pippi Longstocking, Emil of Lönneberga, Karlsson-on-the-Roof, and the Six Bullerby Children, and for the children's fantasy novels Mio, My Son, Ronia the Robber's Daughter, and The Brothers Lionheart. Although best known for her children's and youth books, she has also worked in many other genres, with for example song lyrics, debate articles, realistic autobiographical works like Samuel August from Sevedstorp and Hanna i Hult and contemporary history like War Diaries, 1939–1945.

=== Translations ===
By 2012, Lindgren's books had been translated into 95 different languages or variants. The first chapter of Ronja the Robber's Daughter has in addition been translated into Latin. By 1997, some 3,000 editions of her books had been issued internationally. By the time of her death, her books had sold a total of 80 million copies. By 2010 that had risen to around 167 million books worldwide.

=== Filmography ===
The adaptation of Lindgren's books for film started with Rolf Husberg's 1947 Bill Bergson, Master Detective. This was followed in 1949 by Per Gunvall's adaptation of Pippi Longstocking, and then by many others.

== See also ==
- List of Swedish language writers
