= Miriam Lives in a Kibbutz =

1970 book by Cordelia Edvardson

- Title page for Miriam Lives in a Kibbutz (1970)
- Author: Cordelia Edvardson
- Original title: Miriam bor i en kibbutz
- Illustrator: Anna Riwkin-Brick
- Language: Swedish
- Series: Children's Everywhere
- Publisher: Rabén & Sjögren
- Publication date: 1970
- Preceded by: Matti Lives in Finland
- Followed by: Salima Lives in Kashmir

Miriam Lives in a Kibbutz (Swedish: Miriam bor i en kibbutz) is a book authored by Swedish writer Cordelia Edvardson with photos by Swedish photographer Anna Riwkin-Brick. The book was published by Rabén & Sjögren in 1970.

Although the setting for the book is in Israel, with photographs taken in Israel, the book has not been translated to Hebrew, Israel's official language.

== Plot ==
The story of a 5-year-old girl, Miriam, who arrived from Morocco to Israel and settled on a Kibbutz and her gradual adjustment to life in Israel, aided by her 8-year-old Israeli born friend, David.

== 2014 documentary ==
In her 2014 documentary, Where Is Elle Kari and What Happened to Noriko-san?, director Dvorit Shargal tracks down the person who is portrayed in the book as Miriam (Iris Barkav who lived in Neot Mordechai during her childhood, the setting of the book). Barkav recounts her traumatic experiences from her childhood. According to Barkav, her mother raised her as a single parent and was forced to take pictures with a stranger. The stranger is portrayed in the book as Miriam's father. The documentary presents photos of Barkav and Yaakov (the real-life David from the book) visiting Anna Riwkin-Brick, the book's photographer, while she was receiving treatment at a hospital near their kibbutz.

== Editions ==
- Miriam bor i en kibbutz, Rabén & Sjögren, 1970, Swedish edition
- Edwardson, Cordelia; Riwkin-Brick, Anna (1970), Miriam lives in a kibbutz, Wheaton, ISBN 978-0-08-006572-4
- Miriam Lives in a Kibbutz, New York: Lothrop, Lee & Shepard, 1971, US edition
- Mirjam aus Israel, Hamburg, Verlag Friedrich Oetinger, 1970, German edition
- Maria bor i en kibbutz, Oslo, 1970, Norwegian edition
