= Eli Lives in Israel =

1964 book by Leah Goldberg and Anna Riwkin-Brick

- Author: Leah Goldberg
- Original title: Eli bor i Israel
- Illustrator: Anna Riwkin-Brick
- Language: Swedish
- Series: Children's Everywhere
- Publisher: Rabén & Sjögren
- Publication date: 1964
- Preceded by: Dirk Lives in Holland
- Followed by: Randi Lives in Norway

Eli Lives in Israel (Swedish: Eli bor i Israel) is a children's book by Israeli writer Leah Goldberg,, with photographs by Swedish photographer Anna Riwkin-Brick. It was first published in 1964 by Rabén & Sjögren.

The book is part of a series of documentary-style photographic children's books depicting everyday life in different countries.

== Plot ==
The book is set in Kibbutz Revivim, located in the Negev desert. Although the kibbutz is relatively new, it is situated in an ancient land. The narrative emphasizes the everyday lives of children, portraying them as neither new nor ancient, but simply children.

The story follows three children: Eli (originally named Eyal), Shaul, and Anat, as they experience daily life on the kibbutz.

== Background and production ==
In April 1962, Goldberg, Riwkin-Brick, and her assistant Stella Moore traveled to Kibbutz Revivim. During their stay, they documented life on the kibbutz and visited nearby archaeological sites such as Shivta and Avdat.

Riwkin-Brick took hundreds of photographs for the project, while Goldberg wrote the accompanying text.

The book was published in 1964 as part of the Children's Everywhere series (Swedish: Barnen i världen), a collection of documentary-style children's books depicting everyday life in different countries. Eli Lives in Israel is the ninth book in the series, which comprises 19 titles.

== Publication and translations ==
The book was first released in Sweden in 1964. It was later translated into several languages, including English and German.

In Israel, the series gained significant popularity and cultural impact.

The Hebrew edition was published under the title הרפתקה במדבר (Adventure in the Desert), with Goldberg credited as the author.

Scholars have analyzed the book as part of a broader genre of documentary-style photographic children's literature that presents everyday life in different cultures. Goldberg's children's works often emphasize the relationship between landscape and childhood experience, particularly in the context of Israeli spaces such as the kibbutz.

== Documentary and real-life subjects ==
In the documentary film Where Is Elle Kari and What Happened to Noriko-san?, directed by Dvorit Shargal, the filmmaker locates and interviews the individuals who appeared as children in the book.

The children featured in the story are identified as Shaul Rahabi (a grandson of former Israeli Prime Misiter Golda Meir), Eyal Ben-Levi, and Anat Duvdevani.

== Editions ==
- Eli bor i Israel, Rabén & Sjögren, 1964, Swedish edition
- Eli Lives in Israel, Methuen, 1965, British edition
- Eli Lives in Israel, The Macmillan Company, 1966, US-American edition
- Eli aus Israel, Oetinger Verlag, 1966, German edition
- הרפתקה במדבר Hapoalim, 1966, Hebrew edition
