= Gennet Lives in Ethiopia =

1967 photo novel by Anna Riwkin-Brick

- Author: Vera Forsberg
- Original title: Gennet bor i Etiopien
- Illustrator: Anna Riwkin-Brick
- Language: Swedish
- Series: Children's Everywhere
- Genre: Children's literature
- Publisher: Rabén & Sjögren
- Publication date: 1967
- Publication place: Sweden
- English publication date: 1968
- Preceded by: Noy Lives in Thailand
- Followed by: Matti Lives in Finland

Gennet Lives in Ethiopia (original title: Gennet bor i Etiopien) is the title of a book by the Swedish photograph Anna Riwkin-Brick. In 1967 the book was published by Rabén & Sjögren as the twelfth book in the photo novel series Children's Everywhere. Authors like Astrid Lindgren, Leah Goldberg, Eugénie Söderberg, Elly Jannes and Cordelia Edvardson wrote for the same series.

== Plot ==
Gennet is seven years old and lives in Ethiopia. Her name comes from Amharic and means paradise. One day, Gennet's little brother Mamo gets bitten by a poisonous snake and is up to Gennet to get help. On her way to the doctor she sees monkeys, vultures and flamingos. When she has to cross a deep river, she is helped by a shepherd boy. Finally she arrives at the doctor's house. Immediately, the doctor drives with his jeep to Gennet's brother to help him. Gennet's brother is cured. As a reward, Gennet gets a yellow dress and a necklace at the market.

== Overview ==
Gennet Lives in Ethiopia is the twelfth out of 15 books from the series Children's Everywhere. While Anna Riwkin-Brick made the photos for the book, the Swedish writer Vera Forsberg wrote the text. Vera Forsberg also wrote the text to another book of the series: Salima Lives in Kashmir. Gennet Lives in Ethiopia has been translated into many languages, including Hebrew, English, Danish and German.

In Israel, the series Children of our Earth, which also includes Gennet Lives in Ethiopia, was a great success, thanks to the translations of the poet Leah Goldberg. In 2014, Israeli director Dvorit Shargal shot a 50-minute documentary titled Where Is Elle Kari and What Happened to Noriko-san?, which deals with some of the books from the series Children's Everywhere. After the film was released, nine stories of the Children's Everywhere series were being reissued in Israel, including Gennet Lives in Ethiopia.

== Reception ==
Elisabeth Wesseling praised the high artistic quality of the book. The New England Reading Association thought the book was delightful and informative. The United States Education Office recommended the book for grades 3 to 5.

== Editions ==
- Gennet bor i Etiopien, Rabén & Sjögren, 1967, Swedish edition
- Gennet Lives in Ethiopia, Macmillan, 1968, US-American edition
- Gennet aus Äthiopien, Oetinger Verlag, 1968, German edition
- Gennet bor i Ætiopien, Høst & Søn, 1968, Danish edition
- גנט הילדה מאטיופיה, Poalim, 1971, Hebrew edition
