= Noriko-San: Girl of Japan =

Book by Astrid Lindgren and Anna Riwkin-Brick

- Swedish first edition
- Author: Astrid Lindgren
- Original title: Eva möter Noriko-san
- Illustrator: Anna Riwkin-Brick
- Language: Swedish
- Series: Children's Everywhere
- Genre: Children's literature
- Publisher: Rabén & Sjögren
- Publication date: 1956
- Publication place: Sweden
- English publication date: 1958
- Preceded by: Elle Kari
- Followed by: Sia Lives on Kilimanjaro

Noriko-San: Girl of Japan or Eva visits Noriko-San (original title: Eva möter Noriko-san) is a book by the Swedish writer Astrid Lindgren, with photos by Anna Riwkin-Brick. In 1956 the book was published by Rabén & Sjögren.

== Plot ==
Eva's mother is reading a book about Japan to Eva. Then Eva explains to her mother that she will travel to Japan. Eva says that there is a five-year-old girl who wants to play with her. She calls the girl Noriko-san. Noriko is already looking forward to Eva's visit and puts on her kimono. A festival for boys is being celebrated outside. Noriko is sad that she can not join in, so her mother promises her, that they can arrange a party with girls for Eva. For that the mother allows Noriko to play with the valuable, old dolls. A while later, Noriko's cousins arrive. Just when they are wondering why Eva is not coming, one of them hears a plane. Eva gets out of the plane and is welcomed by Noriko. They exchange their clothes and play together for many days. Finally, Eva has to fly back home to her mother. She says goodbye to Noriko and even speaks Japanese. When asked by her mother why she speaks Japanese, Eva answers that when she is in Japan, she can also speak the language.

== Overview ==
Noriko-San: Girl of Japan is the second of 15 children's books in the series Children's Everywhere. It was the first book written by Astrid Lindgren and Anna Riwkin-Brick together. It was followed by a twelve-year collaboration between them. Riwkin-Brick took the pictures in Japan. When she returned from her trip, she showed the photos to the publisher Rabén & Sjögren. Astrid Lindgren also worked there. After initial rejection, she agreed to write the text for the photo book. The book is the only book in the series that describes a daydream and no real events.

== Documentary from Israel ==
In Israel, the series Children's Everywhere, which also includes Noriko-San: Girl of Japan, was a great success, thanks to the translations of the poet Leah Goldberg. In Israel Noriko-San was the most popular book of the series. In 2014, Israeli director Dvorit Shargal shot a 50-minute documentary titled Where Is Elle Kari and What Happened to Noriko-san?. In this film, she first found Eva from the book and then they searched together for Noriko-san. Through the film Eva Crafoord-Larsen and Noriko Shiraishi met again.

== Reception ==
Kirkus Reviews praised the "wonderful" photographs of Anna Riwkin-Brick and recommended the book for children from the second grade.

== Editions ==
- Eva möter Noriko-san, Rabén & Sjögren, 1956, Swedish edition
- Eva visits Noriko-San, Macmillan, 1957, US-American edition
- נוריקו-סאן הילדה מיפן, Hapoalim, 1957, Israeli edition, translation: Leah Goldberg
- Noriko-San, Girl of Japan, Methuen Publishing, 1958, British edition
- Noriko-San, Oetinger Verlag, 1956, German edition
- Noriko-San - historien om Eva og den lille japanerpige, Høst & Søn, 1957, Danish edition
