= Elle Kari =

1951 book by Elly Jannes

- Author: Elly Jannes
- Original title: Elle Kari
- Illustrator: Anna Riwkin-Brick
- Language: Swedish
- Series: Children's Everywhere
- Genre: Children's literature
- Publisher: Rabén & Sjögren
- Publication date: 1951
- Publication place: Sweden
- English publication date: 1952
- Followed by: Noriko-San: Girl of Japan

Elle Kari is a book by the Swedish writer Elly Jannes with photos by Anna Riwkin-Brick. In 1951 the book was published by Rabén & Sjögren as the first book in the photo novel series Children's Everywhere. Later authors like Astrid Lindgren, Leah Goldberg, Eugénie Söderberg, Vera Forsberg and Cordelia Edvardson wrote for the same series.

== Plot ==
Elle Kari is almost four years old and lives in Lapland. There she lives in a house in winter and in summer in a hut made of logs and peat. Elle Kari loves Tjappo, her father's dog. One day Tjappo disappears. Elle Kari is very sad, but then her mother tells Elle Kari that Tjappo and her father will spend the summer in the mountains. There her father makes sure that the wolves do not tear the little reindeer kids apart. When autumn comes, Tjappo returns with the reindeers. Elle Kari is happy. When Elle Kari falls asleep in the evening, Tjappo guards her and thinks that he wants to go back to the mountains, but only if Elle Kari comes along.

== Overview ==
Elle Kari is the first of 15 books from the series Children's Everywhere. The story is based on true events, but some things have been changed.

The collaboration between Elly Jannes and Anna Riwkin started before the book was written. They wanted to make a photographic book about the indigenous people of the Sámi as part of an UNESCO project. The photographic book entitled Nomads of the North (original title: Vandrande) was addressed to adult readers. During this work, Riwkin also photographed a little girl named Elle Kari and showed the pictures to Elly Jannes. Jannes suggested that Riwkin should create not just the adult book, but also one for children. This was finally published in 1951, with text by Jannes. The book was not only Anna Riwkin-Brick's first photographic book for children, but also the first Swedish photographic book depicting a child's everyday life. The book was an instant hit and has been translated into eighteen different languages. The first issue in Germany alone sold over 25,000 copies.

Elle Kari achieved a sudden fame after the publication of the book. For a long time she was reported on in newspapers and magazines. When Elle Kari had a daughter in the 1970s, a Swedish documentary film was filmed about the daughter.

== Documentary from Israel ==
In Israel, the series Children's Everywhere was a great success. The latter was also based on the translations of the poet Leah Goldberg. In 2014, Israeli director Dvorit Shargal shot a 50-minute documentary titled Where Is Elle Kari and What Happened to Noriko-san?. The film was such a great success that several books from the Children's Everywhere series were reissued in Israel, including Elle Kari. In the documentary, director Dvorit Shargal visits Elle Kari at her home, where Elle Kari speaks about her life. Dvorit Shargal also interviews the daughter of the author Elly Jannes, who was named after Elle Kari.

== Editions ==
- Elle Kari, Rabén & Sjögren, 1951, Swedish edition
- Elle Kari, 1952, US-American edition
- Elle Kari, Methuen, 1962, British edition
- Elle Kari, Oetinger Verlag, 1952, German edition
- Elle Kari - Lapin tyttö, Otava, 1962, Finish edition
- Elle Kari, Gylsendal, 1962, Norwegian edition
- Elli Kári, Sámi girjjit, 1994, Northern Sami edition
- Elle Kaari, Sámi girjjit, 1994, Northern Sami edition
- Elle Kari - historien om en lille pige fra Lapland, Høst & Søn, 1956, Danish edition
