= Sia Lives on Kilimanjaro =

- Author: Astrid Lindgren
- Original title: Sia bor på Kilimandjaro
- Illustrator: Anna Riwkin-Brick
- Language: Swedish
- Series: Children's Everywhere
- Genre: Children's literature
- Publisher: Rabén & Sjögren
- Publication date: 1958
- Publication place: Sweden
- English publication date: 1959
- Preceded by: Noriko-San: Girl of Japan
- Followed by: My Swedish Cousins

Sia Lives on Kilimanjaro (Swedish: Sia bor på Kilimandjaro) is a children's book written by Astrid Lindgren and with photographs by Anna Riwkin-Brick. The original Swedish edition was published in 1958 by the Rabén & Sjögren publishing company in Stockholm. The English translation was published in 1959, in London by Methuen, and in New York by Macmillan. The book was published as part of the Children's Everywhere photo book series. It is a story of a young girl who wants to visit the king at the Chagga Feast, but her father tells her she is too young, and her brother tells her only boys are allowed. The story is about self-determination.

== Story ==
Sia is eight years old and lives with her family on the Kilimanjaro, a high mountain in Africa. She has two younger brothers Saika and Kitutu, one younger sister Linga and one older brother Sariko. The family belongs to the Chaga people. Sia and her brothers and sisters help their parents with their works, like cutting grass. When Sia's parents decide to go to the Chagga Fest at Moshi to see King Marealle, Sia wants to join them, but her father tells her that no children are allowed there, she is too young for the feast and needs to stay home. Sia is told to take care of her younger brothers and sisters. Her older brother Sariko, decides to follow his parents, but tells Sia that only boys are allowed to go. Sia secretly follows him. She thinks that her aunt Mamole can take care of her brothers and sisters. Sariko suddenly realizes that Sia follows him. He angrily tells her to go back home. He adds that he is getting a lift and Sia can't walk there. Then he gets up onto the back of a truck and leaves Sia behind. Sia stops some motor cars and asks for a ride to Moshi. In Moshi Sia only sees boys at the feast, and she wonders if her brother was right and maybe only boys were allowed to come there. She watches some dancers and finally sees King Marealle. Sia is happy and tells him that she came a long way to see him. She also tells the King that her brother thought she was too young to go there. So the King decides to talk to her brother. Meanwhile, her parents are watching her. They are surprised that even though they have told their children not to come, their son and daughter are at the feast, talking to the King, but they decide not to be cross with their children. After the feast is over Sariko tells Sia that she is indeed not too young to go to the feast, she is as big as the Kilimanjaro.

== Background ==
The story is based on true events, but some things have been changed, such as Sia's original name. Sia did not know that she was photographed for a book. She did the photographs because of her father. As a grown up, Sia became a doctor who does research on HIV.

== Documentary film from Israel ==
Especially in Israel, the Children's Everywhere series, including Sia Lives on Kilimanjaro, was a great success, thanks to the translations by the poet Leah Goldberg. In August 2016 the Israeli director Dvorit Shargal made a 54 minutes film called Africa! Sia Lives on Kilimanjaro. Here Shargal goes to Africa to find Sia from Sia Lives on Kilimanjaro and tell her story.

== Awards and nominations ==
=== Awards ===
New York Herald Tribunes Spring Festival Award

- 1963 Children's Spring Book

=== Nominations ===
Deutscher Jugendliteraturpreis

- 1960 picture book

== Critical reception ==
The book received good reviews, but Lindgren's text was considered secondary to the pictures by Rikwin Brick. Bettye I. Latimer praised the excellent photographs of the stories and recommended it for pre-schoolers through 4th grade. She also said that the "pleasant story" describes very well how the Chagga people are living in Africa.

== Editions ==
- Sia bor på Kilimandjaro (1958): Rabén & Sjögren (Swedish edition)
- Sia wohnt am Kilimandscharo (1958): Oetinger (German edition)
- Sia Lives on Kilimanjaro (1959): Methuen Publishing (British edition)
- Sia Lives on Kilimanjaro (1959): Macmillan (US-American edition)
- Sia woont op de Kilimanjaro (1959): Raad voor de zending der Ned. hervormde kerk (Dutch edition)
- סיאה הילדה מאפריקה, Hapoalim, (1959) (Israeli edition), translated by Leah Goldberg
- Sia bor på Kilimanjaro (1970): Høst & Søn (Danish edition)
- Sia anaishi Kilimanjaro (1997): Utgivningsland okänt / Ej specificerat (Swahili edition)
