= Salima Lives in Kashmir =

- Author: Vera Forsberg
- Original title: Salima bor i Kashmir
- Illustrator: Anna Riwkin-Brick
- Language: Swedish
- Series: Children's Everywhere
- Genre: Children's literature
- Publisher: Rabén & Sjögren
- Publication date: 1970
- Publication place: Sweden
- English publication date: 1971
- Preceded by: Matti Lives in Finland

Salima Lives in Kashmir (original title: Salima bor i Kashmir) is the title of a book by the Swedish photographer Anna Riwkin-Brick. In 1970 the book was published by Rabén & Sjögren as the last book in the photo book series Children's Everywhere. Authors like Astrid Lindgren, Leah Goldberg, Eugénie Söderberg, Elly Jannes and Cordelia Edvardson wrote for the same series.

== Plot ==
Salima lives on a houseboat in Srinagar, which is the largest city in Kashmir. Salima's younger brother Nazir goes to school while Salima stays home to look after her younger sister. Nazir's classmates are almost all boys. Only one girl is in the class. Nazir wants his sister Salima to come to school as well, but his teacher tells him that his father and grandfather have to decide this. Nazir wants to talk with his grandfather, but his grandfather just laughs. He thinks that is a strange idea to send a girl to school. Furthermore he mentions that there are many things that Salima has to learn from her mother at home. Salima wants to prove to her grandfather that she is very smart and is able to go to school. She helps her mother wherever she can. When Salimas grandfather meets Nazir's teacher, the teacher tells the old man, that he should let his granddaughter come to school. Finally the grandfather agrees and Salima is happy. After some time she already is able to read, write and sum up. She reads the newspaper to her grandfather.

== Overview ==
Salima Lives in Kashmir is the last out of 15 books from the series Children's Everywhere. In 1969, photographer Anna Riwkin-Brick traveled to Kashmir to take photos for the book. Later, Vera Forsberg wrote a text to the photos. Vera Forsberg also wrote the text to another book of the series: Gennet Lives in Ethiopia. Salima Lives in Kashmir has been translated into many languages, including English, Hebrew, Norwegian and German.

In Israel, the series Children's Everywhere, which also includes Salima Lives in Kashmir, was a great success, thanks to the translations of Leah Goldberg. In 2014, Israeli director Dvorit Shargal shot a 50-minute documentary titled Where Is Elle Kari and What Happened to Noriko-san?, which deals with some of the books from the series. After the release of the film eight books of the Children's Everywhere series were reissued in Israel, but not Salima Lives in Kashmir.

== Reception ==
Vinayak Razdan praised the photos of Anna Riwkin-Brick. He said that the friendly smile of the children in the book, casts a spell over the viewer, and that it shows incredible beauty and innocence. Meena Khorana believed that the reader is able to empathize with the life of Salima. Meena said that it is interesting to read about Salima's desire to break with tradition and to go to school as a girl. The beauty of the Srinagar valley and its inhabitants is captured by the photos. Elisabeth Wesseling praised the high artistic quality of the book. Kirkus Reviews believed that "the story is too loosely and arbitrarily constructed to be of interest in itself".

== Editions ==
- Salima bor i Kashmir, Rabén & Sjögren, 1970, Swedish edition
- Salima Lives in Kashmir, Methuen Publishing, 1971, British edition
- Salima Lives in Kashmir, Macmillan, 1971, US-American edition
- Salima aus Kaschmir, Oetinger Verlag, 1971, German edition
- Salima bor i Kashmir, Gyldendal, 1971, Norwegian edition
- סלימה, הילדה מקשמיר, Merḥaviah: Sifriyat Po'alim, 1973, Israeli edition
