= Marko Lives in Yugoslavia =

1962 novel by Astrid Lindgren

- Author: Astrid Lindgren
- Original title: Marko bor i Jugoslavien
- Illustrator: Anna Riwkin-Brick
- Language: Swedish
- Series: Children's Everywhere
- Genre: Children's literature
- Publisher: Rabén & Sjögren
- Publication date: 1962
- Publication place: Sweden
- English publication date: 1963
- Preceded by: Mokihana Lives in Hawaii
- Followed by: Dirk Lives in Holland

Marko Lives in Yugoslavia (Swedish: Marko bor i Jugoslavien) is the title of a book by the Swedish writer Astrid Lindgren, with the photos of Anna Riwkin-Brick. In 1962 the book was published by Rabén & Sjögren.

== Plot ==
Marko lives in Macedonia, at that time Yugoslavia. He has a little white pig, which runs away on market day. His mother explains to Marko and his brother Petor that they should look for the pig. Finally, they find it and play with it for a while. Then it is Petor turn to take care of the pig, but the pig runs away again. Petor is not able to find it again. While searching for the pig, the boys are distracted by a wedding and other events, such as finding a secret cave. When Petor and Marko finally arrive home after a long day, the pig is already there. It has gone back there on its own.

== Overview ==
Marko lives in Yugoslavia is the seventh of a total of 15 books from the series Children's Everywhere. The book has been translated into many different languages, including English and German. In 1962, the book was first published in Sweden by Rabén & Sjögren. Marko Lives in Yugoslavia is one of the few books in the series that has not been published in Israel, where the books were very successful. The reason for this was that in the story was about a pig, that is embraced in the photos by Marko, which is considered in Judaism as not kosher.

During her eleven-year correspondence with Louise Hartung, which was published in the book Jag har också levat!, Astrid Lindgren wrote about the book. She explained that Anna Rikwin and the Yugoslav Legation wanted to take photos in Dalmatia. On September 27, 1960 Lindgren traveled to Yugoslavia, where she first made holidays with Louise Hartung, before she met up with Anna Riwkin on October 4 to create the photo book. First, the photo book should take place in Lovran, and later Riwkin decided to relocate it to Macedonia, as this still has something of the "original Balkan". When Lindgren left Macedonia, however, Riwkin had barely begun with the book.

After completing the series, Lindgren explained that while working with Riwkin-Brick was nice, she did not like the books, especially Marko Lives in Yugoslavia. She was not dissatisfied with the photos of Riwkin-Brick, but rather with her own performance as a writer.

== Editions ==
- Marko bor i Jugoslavien, Rabén & Sjögren, 1962, Swedish edition
- Marko Lives in Yugoslavia, Macmillan, 1963, US-American edition
- Marko in Jugoslawien, Oetinger Verlag, 1962, German edition
- Marko bor i Jugoslavia, Gyldendal, 1962, Norwegian edition
- Marko bor i Jugoslavien, Høst & Søn, 1962, Danish edition
