= Children's Everywhere =

Swedish photo book series

- Elle Kari (1951); Eva möter Noriko-san (1958); Sia bor på Kilimandjaro (1958); Mina svenska kusiner (1959); Lilibet, cirkusbarn (1960); Mokihana bor på Hawaii (1961); Marko bor i Jugoslavien (1962); Jackie bor i Holland (1963); Eli bor i Israel (1964); Randi bor i Norge (1965); Noy bor i Thailand (1966); Gennet bor i Etiopien (1968); Matti bor i Finland (1968); Miriam bor i en kibbutz (1969); Salima bor i Kashmir (1970)
- Author: Elly Jannes; Astrid Lindgren; Eugénie Söderberg; Leah Goldberg; Vera Forsberg; Cordelia Edvardson
- Illustrator: Anna Riwkin-Brick
- Cover artist: Anna Riwkin-Brick
- Country: Sweden
- Language: Swedish
- Genre: Children, photographic book
- Publisher: Rabén & Sjögren (Sweden); Methuen/Macmillan (UK); Atheneum/Lee & Shepard (US)
- Published: 1951 – 1970
- Published in English: 1952 – 1971
- Media type: Print (hardback & paperback)
- No. of books: 15

Children's Everywhere (also known as Children of the World) is a Swedish photographic book series published by Rabén & Sjögren, dealing with the daily lives of children around the world in the 1950s and 1960s. The illustration are by Anna Riwkin-Brick. The writers are Astrid Lindgren, Elly Jannes, Leah Goldberg and Cordelia Edvardson.

== Story ==
The book series deals with children from Europe, Asia or Africa, and also one from USA (Hawaii) whose everyday lives are described with images and a small amount of text.

== Background ==
The photographic book series was initially published in Swedish by Rabén & Sjögren. The first book in the series (Elle Kari) was released in 1951. At first Anna Riwkin-Brick took photographs of Elle-Kari and her surrounding and then Elly Jannes wrote the story. The book series was translated into 18 additional languages, including English, German (titled: Kinder unserer Welt – Children of our World) and Hebrew (titled: ילדי העולם – Children of the World). The first editions in Germany and the United Kingdom alone included 25,000 copies. The book was followed by 14 more books, which were sold more than 900,000 times.

=== Cooperation with Astrid Lindgren ===
Astrid Lindgren was the author of most of the books in the series, with a total of nine volumes. Originally Lindgren was not interested in writing for the photographic book series. When Anna Riwkin-Brick came back after a trip from Japan, her publisher wanted to create a photographic book with Riwkin-Brick's new pictures. No suitable author was found. Therefore, the publishers asked Astrid Lindgren to write the story. During most, but not all, of Riwkin-Brick's new projects Lindgren either accompanied Riwkin-Brick directly or followed her later. The photographs for the books were selected by both, Lindgren and Riwkin-Brick, before Lindgren wrote the story. An exception is their last work together, Matti Lives in Finland, which was written before the pictures were taken. After completing the series, Lindgren explained that although she had loved working with Riwkin-Brick, she did not like the books, especially Marko Lives in Yugoslavia (original: Marko bor i Jugoslavien) due to her own performance as a writer.

=== Documentary films from Israel ===
Especially in Israel, the series was a great success, thanks to the translations by the poet Leah Goldberg. In 2014 the Israeli director Dvorit Shargal made a 50 minutes film (Where Is Elle Kari and What Happened to Noriko-san?) about what had happened to Elle-Kari, Dirk, Noriko-san and Eva and the children from the Israeli books in the series. Furthermore, she showed how Noriko and Eva from the books met each other again in Tokyo. The film resulted in seven stories being reissued in Israel, including: Elle Kari, Noriko-San: Girl of Japan, Sia Lives on Kilimanjaro, Lilibet, Circus Child, Dirk Lives in Holland, Noy Lives in Thailand and Gennet Lives in Ethiopia.

In August 2016 a new film, Africa! Sia Lives on Kilimanjaro, was released. This time the director Dvorit Shargal goes to Africa to find Sia from Sia Lives on Kilimanjaro (Sia bor på Kilimandjaro).

In October 2017 the film Where is Lilibet the Circus Child and What Happened in Honolulu? followed. Here Dvorit Shargal tries to find out what had happened to Lilibet from Lilibet, Circus Child (Lilibet, cirkusbarn) and Mokihana from Mokihana Lives in Hawaii.

== Works ==
Year	Title (English)	Original title	Author	Illustrator
1951, English 1952	Elle Kari	Elle Kari	Elly Jannes	Anna Riwkin-Brick
1956, English 1958	Noriko-San: Girl of Japan	Eva möter Noriko-san	Astrid Lindgren	Anna Riwkin-Brick
1958, English 1959	Sia Lives on Kilimanjaro	Sia bor på Kilimandjaro	Astrid Lindgren	Anna Riwkin-Brick
1959, English 1959	My Swedish Cousins	Mina svenska kusiner	Astrid Lindgren	Anna Riwkin-Brick
1960, English 1961	Lilibet, Circus Child	Lilibet, cirkusbarn	Astrid Lindgren	Anna Riwkin-Brick
1961, English 1961	Mokihana Lives in Hawaii	Mokihana bor på Hawaii	Eugénie Söderberg	Anna Riwkin-Brick
1962, English 1963	Marko Lives in Yugoslavia	Marko bor i Jugoslavien	Astrid Lindgren	Anna Riwkin-Brick
1963, English 1964	Dirk Lives in Holland	Jackie bor i Holland	Astrid Lindgren	Anna Riwkin-Brick
1964, English 1964	Eli Lives in Israel	Eli bor i Israel	Leah Goldberg	Anna Riwkin-Brick
1965, English 1965	Randi Lives in Norway	Randi bor i Norge	Astrid Lindgren	Anna Riwkin-Brick
1966, English 1967	Noy Lives in Thailand	Noy bor i Thailand	Astrid Lindgren	Anna Riwkin-Brick
1967, English 1968	Gennet Lives in Ethiopia	Gennet bor i Etiopien	Vera Forsberg	Anna Riwkin-Brick
1968, English 1968	Matti Lives in Finland	Matti bor i Finland	Astrid Lindgren	Anna Riwkin-Brick
1969, English 1970	Miriam Lives in a Kibbutz	Miriam bor i en kibbutz	Cordelia Edvardson	Anna Riwkin-Brick
1970, English 1971	Salima Lives in Kashmir	Salima bor i Kashmir	Vera Forsberg	Anna Riwkin-Brick

== Awards and nominations ==
=== Awards ===
New York Herald Tribunes Spring Festival Award

- 1963: Sia Lives on Kilimanjaro (Sia bor på Kilimandjaro): Children's Spring Book

=== Nominations ===
Deutscher Jugendliteraturpreis

- 1960: Sia Lives on Kilimanjaro (Sia bor på Kilimandjaro): picture book
- 1966: Randi Lives in Norway (Randi bor i Norge): picture book
