= Mokihana Lives in Hawaii =

- Author: Eugénie Söderberg
- Original title: Mokihana bor på Hawaii
- Illustrator: Anna Riwkin-Brick
- Language: Swedish
- Series: Children's Everywhere
- Genre: Children's literature
- Publisher: Rabén & Sjögren
- Publication date: 1961
- Publication place: Sweden
- English publication date: 1961
- Preceded by: Lilibet, Circus Child
- Followed by: Marko Lives in Yugoslavia

Mokihana Lives in Hawaii (original title: Mokihana bor på Hawaii) is a book by the Swedish writer Eugénie Söderberg, with photos by Anna Riwkin-Brick. In 1961 the book was published by Rabén & Sjögren in Sweden.

== Plot ==
Mokihana lives in Hawaii where she has many friends. Originally the children's families came to Hawaii from different countries and cultures, but they all speak English. The friends meet each other almost every day and have many adventures. They are organising a secret birthday party for Anela, who turns ten. Mokihana and her friends are preparing flower wreaths for the party and Mokihana draws a picture of Anela's favourite dog Iki. Anela is surprised because she thought that everyone had forgotten her birthday. Together the friends celebrate her birthday, eat mangos, pineapple, banana, papayas, ice cream, cakes and drink orange juice. In addition, Anela gets chicks in a basket as a birthday present, and she is overjoyed.

== Overview ==
The book Mokihana is part of the Children's Everywhere series by Anna Riwkin-Brick and was made in Hawaii. Anna Riwkin-Brick and her sister Eugénie Söderberg lived there for several months. While Riwkin took the photos, Söderberg was responsible for the text. For a picture that appeared in the book, more than a hundred photos were taken.

== Documentary film from Israel ==
Especially in Israel, the Children's Everywhere series were a great success, which was also based on the translations by the poet Leah Goldberg. In 2017, Israeli director Dvorit Shargal shot a 50-minute documentary entitled Where Is Lilibet the Circus Child and What Happened in Honolulu?. In the film, director Shargal tried to find out what happened to Mokihana after the end of the book.

== Reception ==
At the time of publication, the book was considered as a school book for educational purposes. It showed how children, whose families were originally from different cultures, play with each other very happily without any prejudices. Rose C. Merenda wrote in the book Day Care and Early Education (1987) that Mokihana Lives in Hawaii is a great story to teach and educate children in schools on Hawaiian life. It is especially important because the students can compare Mokihana's life to their own life. The Moderna Museet in Stockholm presented an exhibition about Anna Riwkin in 2019, which also featured the Children's Everywhere series and Mokihana Lives in Hawaii. This exhibition was called The world beyond my suburb.

== Editions ==
- Mokihana, Rabén & Sjögren, 1961, Swedish edition
- Mokihana Lives in Hawaii, 1961, Macmillan, 1964, US-American edition
- מוקיהנה מהוי, Or-Am Publishing, 1961, Hewbrew edition
- Mokihana bor på Hawaii, Oetinger Verlag, 1962, German edition
- Mokihana fra Hawaii, Köpenhamn, 1964, Danish edition
