= Lilibet, Circus Child =

Book by Astrid Lindgren

- First edition
- Author: Astrid Lindgren
- Original title: Lilibet, cirkusbarn
- Illustrator: Anna Riwkin-Brick
- Language: Swedish
- Series: Children's Everywhere
- Genre: Children's literature
- Publisher: Rabén & Sjögren
- Publication date: 1960
- Publication place: Sweden
- English publication date: 1961
- Preceded by: My Swedish Cousins
- Followed by: Mokihana Lives in Hawaii

Lilibet, Circus Child (original title: Lilibet, cirkusbarn) is a book by the Swedish writer Astrid Lindgren, with photos by Anna Riwkin-Brick. In 1960 the book was published by Rabén & Sjögren.

== Plot ==
Lilibet lives with her father and mother in a caravan. This belongs to a circus, in which Lilibet's parents work. Lilibet loves animals. Every day she feeds the two elephants, Babette and Lona, with apples.

Every day Lilibet plays with her boyfriend Leo. They feel sorry for the tigers and the monkeys, who should not sit in cages but belong in the jungle. Leo would like to release the animals, but he has no say in the circus.

Lilibet wants to become a circus rider, but Leo keeps telling her that she can not do that. Although Lilibet practices riding horses every day, she is confused by Leo's statements.

The clown Teddy Ballon believes in Lilibet. He gives Lilibet a magic rope and explains that Lilibet can become a circus rider when she puts the magic rope around the tail of a horse and says hocus pocus Fidibus. Lilibet does that, but she can not convince Leo that she will be a good horse rider. Lilibet is sad and is comforted by her father. He thinks that she will become a great circus rider and this convinces Lilibet. In the end she is standing on the back of a horse.

== Overview ==
Lilibet, Circus Child is the fifth of 15 books from the series Children's Everywhere. The story is based on true events, but some things have changed. The book has been translated into many different languages, including English, German, Hebrew and Dutch. Lilibet is the only story of the series told in a first-person narrative.

Anna Riwkin Brick had a journalist friend who visited the circus. He told her about a 5.5-year-old girl who was a great fit for a new book. She went to the circus in northern Sweden and spent a week there. She then called Astrid Lindgren, who spoke to the girl and wrote her story. Later the girl arrived in Stockholm, and then they returned to the circus to complete the shooting.

== Documentary film from Israel ==
Especially in Israel, the Children's Everywhere series, including Lilibet, Circus Child, was a great success, thanks to the translations by the poet Leah Goldberg. In 2017, Israeli director Dvorit Shargal shot a 50-minute documentary entitled Where Is Lilibet the Circus Child and What Happened in Honolulu?. In the film, director Shargal tried to find out what happened to Lilibet after the end of the book. Lilibet now lives in Bussum in Holland and is a German teacher at Erfgooiers College. In reality, Lilibet is called Ingrid Heinrich.

== Reception ==
Ariana Melamed of Ynet said that Lilibet, Circus Child taught her how difficult and fascinating the life of a circus girl is.

Ruth Herrmann of Die Zeit wrote that Lilibet is about a little girl named Lilibet, which can be seen on many photos. Astrid Lindgren's text describes what Lilibet thinks, experiences and desires. The book is child-oriented, full of charm, with a naturally acting of little leading lady.

== Editions ==
- Lilibet, cirkusbarn, Rabén & Sjögren, 1960, Swedish edition
- Circus Child, Methuen Publishing, 1960, British edition
- Lilibet, Circus Child, Macmillan, 1966, US-American edition
- Lilibet, das Zirkuskind, Oetinger Verlag, 1960, German edition
- לילבס ילדת הקרקס, Hapoalim, 1961, Hebrew edition, translator: Leah Goldberg
- Lilibet sirkusbarn, Gyldendal, 1961, Norwegian edition
- Lilibet cirkusbarn, Gads, 1961, Danish edition
