= Dirk Lives in Holland =

1963 children's book

- Author: Astrid Lindgren
- Original title: Jackie bor i Holland
- Illustrator: Anna Riwkin-Brick
- Language: Swedish
- Series: Children's Everywhere
- Genre: Children's literature
- Publisher: Rabén & Sjögren
- Publication date: 1963
- Publication place: Sweden
- English publication date: 1964
- Preceded by: Marko Lives in Yugoslavia
- Followed by: Randi Lives in Norway

Dirk Lives in Holland (original title: Jackie bor i Holland) is the title of a book by the Swedish writer Astrid Lindgren, with photos by Anna Riwkin-Brick. In 1963, the book was published by Rabén & Sjögren in Sweden.

== Plot ==
Dirk lives in Holland, in a city directly by the sea. His father is a fisherman and sometimes Dirk joins him while he goes fishing.

Dirk would like to have a bike, but his parents cannot afford it, while other children have bikes and drive together to the place where the sailing yacht of the Queen will pass by.

His friend Elleke can distract him for a while, and they play with a rabbit in the garden. Then they try to reach the place, where the sailing yacht will pass by, by foot, but they are too late, and the boat is already gone. When Dirk tells his father about this, his father says that he wants to buy a bike for Dirk, but he has to save money for a long time.

Dirk's grandparents, however, have a surprise for Dirk. From their savings they buy a bike for him. Overjoyed, Dirk presents this to his friend Elleke.

== Documentary from Israel ==
In Israel, the series Children's Everywhere, which also includes Dirk Lives in Holland, was a great success, thanks to the translations of the poet Leah Goldberg. In 2014, Israeli director Dvorit Shargal shot a 50-minute documentary titled Where Is Elle Kari and What Happened to Noriko-san?. In the documentary Shargal visits Dirk in Holland. Dirk shows her the places where the photos were taken. He tells her about his first bicycle, which he received from Astrid Lindgren for his birthday and reads a letter that Astrid Lindgren later wrote to him. In it, Astrid Lindgren recalls her visit to Holland, where she created the book together with Anna Riwkin.

== Reception ==
Bjornen Sobel believed that the book gives an insight into the Netherlands and the lifestyle of the people in the 1950s. This photo book depicts a completely different environment than today, which is why he considered it a very attractive picture book for children of all ages.

== Editions ==
- Jackie bor i Holland, Rabén & Sjögren, 1963, Swedish edition
- Dirk Lives in Holland, Macmillan, 1964, US-American edition
- Japi aus Holland, Oetinger Verlag, 1963, German edition
- Japie bor i Holland, Høst & Søn, 1964, Danish edition
- דירק הילד מהולנד, Hapoalim, 1970, Hebrew edition
- Klaas as an Ísiltír, Oifig an tSoláthair, 1979, Irish edition
