= My Swedish Cousins =

Book by Astrid Lindgren

- Author: Astrid Lindgren
- Original title: Mina svenska kusiner
- Illustrator: Anna Riwkin-Brick
- Language: Swedish
- Series: Children's Everywhere
- Genre: Children's literature
- Publisher: Rabén & Sjögren
- Publication date: 1959
- Publication place: Sweden
- English publication date: 1959
- Preceded by: Sia Lives on Kilimanjaro
- Followed by: Lilibet, Circus Child

My Swedish Cousins (original title: Mina svenska kusiner) is the title of a book by the Swedish writer Astrid Lindgren, with photos by Anna Riwkin-Brick. In 1959 the book was published by Rabén & Sjögren.

== Plot ==
Bjorn lives in Dalarna, which is a part of Sweden, but Bjorn believes that Dalarna is all of Sweden. Through his many cousins he learns that Sweden is much bigger than he thinks. Bjorn's grandmother gets a lot of mail from her grandchildren, which she reads to Bjorn.

Maria and Anders live in Skåne. They write their grandmother from school and describe Mary's difficulties to sit still. After school, the siblings ride home with their bike. Then they ride a horse.

Sigrid lives in a fishing village on the west coast by the sea. She writes to her grandmother about her school trip to Gothenburg. On this she saw a ship, which was larger than a house. In her own village, however, the boats are small and are often used for fishing and sailing. She also writes that she always goes to school by boat because the school is on an island. On the way back she is able do the homework on the boat.

Johan and Eva live in the Swedish capital Stockholm. Johan tells his grandmother that the cat Pio, who she gave to Eva, is fine. He tells her that his sister Eva showed the city to Pio, but Johan believes that Pio is not interested in city life, because he is a land cat. Johan thinks that Pio would prefer to go back to the countryside. Otherwise, Pio is fine.

Gunnar lives in a mountain village in Norrland. There are mountains, forests, lakes and in winter there is a lot of snow. He writes that he loves to go skiing in winter.

Bjorn's cousins visit the grandmother in spring. The children play together. When his cousins leave, Bjorn is sad, but his grandmother comforts him. His cousins will come back in 360 days for a visit.

== Overview ==
My Swedish Cousins is the fourth of 15 books of the series Children's Everywhere. It was published in 1959 by Rabén & Sjögren, as Mina svenska kusiner.

The book wanted to give children an overview of life in different regions in Sweden. While the boy is called Lasse in the German version, he is called Björn in the Swedish original, as well as in the English translation.

In addition, the book has been translated into many different languages, including English, German and Hebrew. In Israel, the series Children of our Earth, which includes My Swedish Cousins, was a great success.

Bjorn and his grandmother wear typical clothes from the province of Dalarna.

== Editions ==
- Mina svenska kusiner, Rabén & Sjögren, 1959, Swedish edition
- My Swedish Cousins, Macmillan, 1959, US-American edition
- בני הדודים משבדיה, Or-Am publishing, 1959, Hebrew edition
- Lasse aus Dalarna, Oetinger Verlag, 1959, German edition
- Lasse fra Dalarna, Gad, Nord. rotogr., 1961, Danish edition
