= Randi Lives in Norway =

1965 book by Astrid Lindgren

- Author: Astrid Lindgren
- Original title: Randi bor i Norge
- Illustrator: Anna Riwkin-Brick
- Language: Swedish
- Series: Children's Everywhere
- Genre: Children's literature
- Publisher: Rabén & Sjögren
- Publication date: 1965
- Publication place: Sweden
- English publication date: 1965
- Preceded by: Dirk Lives in Holland
- Followed by: Noy Lives in Thailand

Randi Lives in Norway (also: Gerda Lives in Norway, original title: Randi bor i Norge) is the title of a book by the Swedish writer Astrid Lindgren, with photos by Anna Riwkin-Brick. In 1965 the book was published by Rabén & Sjögren.

== Plot ==
Randi lives in Lofoten. Her father is a fisherman. At home, Randi plays a lot with her neighbor and friend Helga. One day, however, Randi prefers to play with Reidar. When Helga runs after her and asks if she can play with Randi, Randi throws a snowball right into Helga's face. Then she runs away with Reidar. Helga does not give up and follows the friends, but the children continue throwing snowballs at Helga. Helga runs home crying. In the evening Randi feels bad because she was so mean to Helga and Helga was so sad. When she wants to play with Helga the next morning, Randi is afraid that Helga does not want to see her again. Helga wants to play with Randi and tells Randi that she really likes her, even though Randi had been mean to her the day before.

== Overview ==
Randi Lives in Norway is the tenth of 15 books of the series Children's Everywhere. The book was first published in 1965 by the Swedish publisher Rabén & Sjögren. In addition, the book has been translated into many different languages, including English and German. In the American version, Randi retains her name in the British version, and her name is Gerda. The story takes place in a northern Norwegian village in Lofoten.

== Reception ==
=== Reviews ===
The jury of the Youth Literature Prize justified the nomination of the book for the German Youth Literature Prize by stating that the children and the fishing village are turned into pictures that are so lively, that the children can literally smell the fish and feel the cold. This gives a good impression of the landscape and the people in Lofoten.

=== Nominations ===
Deutscher Jugendliteraturpreis

- 1966: Randi Lives in Norway (Randi bor i Norge): picture book

== Editions ==
- Randi bor i Norge, Rabén & Sjögren, 1965, Swedish edition
- Gerda Lives in Norway, Methuen Publishing, 1965, British edition
- Randi Lives in Norway, Macmillan, 1965, US-American edition
- Randi aus Norwegen, Oetinger Verlag, 1965, German edition
- Ingrid as an Iorua, Oifig an tSoláthair, 1979, Irish edition
- Randi bor i Norge, Høst & Søn, 1966, Danish edition
- Randi bor i Lofoten, Gyldendal, 1965, Norwegian edition
