= Matti Lives in Finland =

1968 book by Astrid Lindgren

- Author: Astrid Lindgren
- Original title: Matti bor i Finland
- Illustrator: Anna Riwkin-Brick
- Language: Swedish
- Series: Children's Everywhere
- Genre: Children's literature
- Publisher: Rabén & Sjögren
- Publication date: 1968
- Publication place: Sweden
- English publication date: 1968
- Preceded by: Gennet Lives in Ethiopia
- Followed by: Salima Lives in Kashmir

Matti Lives in Finland (original title: Matti bor i Finland) is a book by Swedish writer Astrid Lindgren, with the photos by Anna Riwkin-Brick. In 1968 the book was published at Rabén & Sjögren.

== Plot ==
Matti lives on a farm in Finland. He has one friend named Merja. Merja has a nice grandfather, who Matti also likes to visit. In addition, Merja owns a dog named Kari, which Matti loves. Matti would also like to have his own animal, but he does not get it.

One day when Merja falls into the sea and threatens to drown, Matti is able to save her. The two promise each other not to tell anybody about this.

Some time later, Matti's father comes to the farm with a small calf, which he gives to Matti. From then on, Matti takes care of the calf every day and visits it constantly.

One day, Merja's grandfather buys the calf from Matti's father. He wants to slaughter the calf for his birthday dinner. Matti is heartbroken, but Merja's grandfather does not make compromises, and when Matti's father wants to buy the calf, he refuses.

Merja sees how desperate and sad Matti is and decides to talk to her grandfather. She asks how much she is worth to him. Her grandfather says she is worth all the money in the world. Then she says that her grandfather should give the calf to Matti, because Matti had saved her and she would no longer exist without Matti. This is the moment when the grandfather realizes how important the calf is to Matti and gives it to him. After this everyone celebrates grandfather's birthday.

== Overview ==
Matti Lives in Finland was first published in 1968 and was released as Matti bor i Finland by the Swedish publisher Rabén & Sjögren. It is the thirteenth of a total of 15 children's books from the Children's Everywhere series. It is the last book by Anna Riwkin-Brick and Astrid Lindgren. The book is out of print and can only be purchased second-hand.

The book has been translated into many other languages, such as German, English and Hebrew. In Israel, the series Children's Everywhere, which also includes Matti Lives in Finland, was a great success.

== Development history ==
The book differs from the other Astrid Lingren works in the series. It was not Riwkin-Brick who first made the photos for the book, and Astrid Lindgren who wrote the text after it, but the other way around.

Lindgren wrote to Riwkin-Brick that the book should become a sort of Bullerbü photobook. It should be about a seven to eight-year-old, sweet, Finnish farm boy. It should show his everyday life while working on the farm and while playing.

Lindgren also wrote a manuscript describing which photos Rivkin should make of Matti. He was supposed to feed the pig, to pick up berries and so on. In the first version of Lindgren's story, Matti saves another boy's life. As he moves away, the boy gives his dog to Matti. Matti is not accepted by the dog as his new owner, which makes Matti very sad. Matti's mother explains that he should be patient. After Matti has dealt with other things throughout the day, the dog has become accustomed to the new environment. He accepts Matti as his new owner. In the last picture there should be a happy Matti, who jumps around with the dog. Lindgren wrote in close collaboration with Rivkin several versions of the story, which Riwkin oriented to with her photos. Lindgren changed her text in connection with the photos again and again, until the last and current book version was created.

== Reception ==
Kirkus Reviews praised the wonderfully fresh landscapes. In addition, they noted that the story has a sweet innocence that is rare today.

Readingastrid said that the book, unlike many of the other books of the Children's Everywhere series, is amazingly up to date. The book focuses on a fight that almost all children are exposed to: wanting to have a pet. The idea that someone would just buy this animal and eat it creates an exciting atmosphere for children even today, which encourages them to continue reading. Moreover, the children are able to empathize with the feelings of the main character, such as his anger.

== Editions ==
- Matti bor i Finland, Rabén & Sjögren, 1968, Swedish edition
- Matti Lives in Finland, Macmillan, 1968, US-American edition
- Matti Lives in Finland, Methuen Publishing, 1969, British edition
- Matti bor i Finland, Gyldendal, 1968, Norwegian edition
- Matti bor i Finland, Høst & Søn, 1968, Danish edition
- Matti aus Finnland, Oetinger Verlag, 1969, German edition
- Matti ja kesä, Otava, 1969, Finish edition
- מטי מפינלנד, Or-Am Publishing, 1979, Hebrew edition
