= Noy Lives in Thailand =

Book written by Astrid Lindgren

- Author: Astrid Lindgren
- Original title: Noy bor i Thailand
- Illustrator: Anna Riwkin-Brick
- Language: Swedish
- Series: Children's Everywhere
- Genre: Children's literature
- Publisher: Rabén & Sjögren
- Publication date: 1966
- Publication place: Sweden
- English publication date: 1967
- Preceded by: Randi Lives in Norway
- Followed by: Gennet Lives in Ethiopia

Noy Lives in Thailand (original title: Noy bor i Thailand) is the title of a book by the Swedish writer Astrid Lindgren, with photos by Anna Riwkin-Brick. In 1966, the book was published by Rabén & Sjögren.

== Plot ==
Noy lives with her parents in Thailand, in a small village near Bangkok. Noy would like to go to the big city, but her parents believe that she is still too small for it. Noy is more than pleased when her father actually wants to take her to Bangkok one day. Together, they go there by raft. Since Noy's father has to do some shopping, he tells Noy to wait for him on the raft, but Noy thinks the city is too exciting to wait there and leaves the raft. When Noy gets hungry, she wants to return to her father's raft, but she does not find the way back. After a long time she comes to a temple. She prays that she finds her father again, but at the same time she is so exhausted that she falls asleep on the spot. When she wakes up and leaves the temple, she sees her father standing there. He had already been worried about her. He takes Noy home. Along the way, Noy explains that Bangkok is good in two ways, it is good to get there, but just as good to leave again.

== Overview ==
Noy Lives in Thailand is the eleventh of a total of 15 books from the series Children's Everywhere. The story is based on true events, but some things have changed. In Sweden, the book was first published in 1966 by Rabén & Sjögren.

In addition, the book has been translated into many different languages, including English, German and Hebrew. While the girl's name in German is Wanthai, she is called Noy in the original and the English translation. In Israel, the series Children's Everywhere, which also includes Noy Lives in Thailand, has been a great success. The latter was also based on the translations of the poet Leah Goldberg. In 2015 a new edition of the book had been published in Israel.

== Reception ==
Readingastrid believed that Noy Lives in Thailand is one of the best children's stories of Children's Everywhere, and called it a simple, but also interesting and sweet story. Readingastrid considered Noy as a fun character, and also said that the story can be appealing to children today.

Sipurpashut.com described the book as a classic for several generations. In this book, the children get to know the everyday life of a girl in Thailand, learning about Noy, her family, her home and Bangkok.

== Editions ==
- Noy bor i Thailand, Rabén & Sjögren, 1966, Swedish edition
- Noy Lives in Thailand, Circus Child, Methuen Publishing, 1967, British edition
- Noy Lives in Thailand, Circus Child, Macmillan, 1967, US-American edition
- Wanthai aus Thailand, Oetinger Verlag, 1967, German edition
- Noy bor i Thailand, Høst & Søn, 1967, Danish edition
- Noy bor i Thailand, Gyldendal, 1967, Norwegian edition
- נואי הילדה מתאילנד, Hapoalim, 1967, Hebrew edition
