= Where Is Elle Kari and What Happened to Noriko-san? =

- Film poster
- Directed by: Dvorit Shargal
- Written by: Dvorit Shargal
- Edited by: Shimon Spector
- Production companies: Rabinovich Foundation; The Israel Film Council
- Release date: 2014
- Running time: 50 minutes
- Country: Israel
- Languages: Hebrew; English

Where Is Elle Kari and What Happened to Noriko-san? (Hebrew: איפה אלה קרי ומה קרה לנוריקו-סאן?) is an Israeli documentary by Dvorit Shargal from 2014. It deals with the photo books from the series Children's Everywhere by Anna Riwkin-Brick, Astrid Lindgren, Leah Goldberg and Elly Jannes. Where Is Elle Kari and What Happened to Noriko-san? is the first part of a film trilogy. The follow-up films, which also deal with the photo books from the series Children's Everywhere, were filmed in 2016 (Africa! Sia Lives on Kilimanjaro) and 2017 (Where Is Lilibet the Circus Child and What Happened in Honolulu?).

== Plot ==
As a child, director Dvorit Shargal read Anna Riwkin-Brick's books Elle Kari and Noriko-San: Girl of Japan. Through these books she learned about the lives of other girls in other distant countries. She identified with the protagonists, wanted to have skis like Elle Kari from the book of the same name, or wear a kimono like Noriko-san. When she opens her former favorite books, Shargal finds a letter written by her to Noriko-san. This was, however, sent back to her with the note: address unknown. Then she decides to start looking for the protagonists from the books. Noriko-san is of particular importance to her.

The search for Noriko-san, however, is more difficult than expected, as Shargal only has a first name. Therefore, she tries to find Ella Kari first, a girl from the indigenous Sámi people and the protagonist of the book with the same name. Shargal actually finds an Elle Kari through an internet search. It turns out that this Elle Kari is the daughter of the writer Elly Jannes. She is named after the protagonist of Anna Riwkin-Brick and Elly Janne's book. After interviewing her, Shargal finally meets Elle Kari from the book. Elle Kari tells about her life, shows more photos of Anna Riwkin-Brick and a documentary about her daughter from the 1970s. In addition, Shargal reports how the indigenous Sámi people developed after the 1950s.

To find out more about Anna Riwkin-Brick, Shargal searches the archive of the Swedish National Library in Stockholm. There she learns that Anna Riwkin wrote books along with the Israeli author Leah Goldberg. In Israel she meets the protagonists Anat, Shaul, Daniel and Miriam from the books Eli Lives in Israel and Miriam Lives in a Kibbutz of the Children's Everywhere series.

Later, she continues to search for her favorite protagonist Noriko-san. She learns that the book was written by Astrid Lindgren. Although she does not find any information about Noriko in the Astrid Lindgren Archive in Stockholm, she comes across a letter from the protagonist of the book Dirk lives in Holland, who is not called Dirk, but Jackie. She meets Jackie. He tells her about the work with Anna Riwkin and Astrid Lindgren. In addition, Jackie takes Shargal to the places where the photos were taken. He tells her about his first bicycle, which he had received from Astrid Lindgren for his birthday and reads a letter that Astrid Lindgren had written to him. In it, Astrid Lindgren recalls her visit to Holland, where she created the book together with Anna Riwkin.

When Shargal publicly searches for Noriko-san, she finds Eva, another protagonist from Noriko-san. Together they are looking for Noriko-san. They fly to Japan and visit the places where the photos were taken. They also ask locals about Noriko-san and eventually make adds in newspapers. Through a newspaper article they finally find Noriko-san and meet her.

== Overview ==
Where Is Elle Kari and What Happened to Noriko-san? is the debut film of the director Dvorit Shargal. Originally, Shargal worked as a journalist, but gave up her work to make a documentary about her search for the heroines of her childhood from the Children's Everywhere photobook series. Children's Everywhere deals with the lives of children in different countries, such as Sweden, Japan, Israel etc. The director had a particular interest in finding Noriko-san from the book of the same name, but the search was extremely difficult because she had only a first name. During her search, she came across other protagonists from the same book series and tried to find out more about the life of the photographer of the series, Anna Riwkin-Brick.

The documentary has been shot within four years in different countries and continents. Shargal first met Ella Kari in Jokkmokk (Sweden), then she traveled to Israel and Tokyo.

Because of the film, nine photo books of the series were reissued in Israel, including: Elle Kari, Noriko-San: Girl of Japan, Sia Lives on Kilimanjaro, Lilibet, Circus Child, Dirk Lives in Holland, Noy Lives in Thailand, Salima Lives in Kashmir, Eli Lives in Israel and Gennet Lives in Ethiopia.

Eva Crafoord-Larsen and Noriko Shiraishi, the protagonists from Noriko-San, met each other again within the film. In an interview, they explained that they have become good friends. They had met again after making the film, in Tokyo and Sweden.

The film was shown in several international film festivals. In Israel, the film premiered on 3 July 2014 as part of the Children and Youth Film Festival Tel Aviv. The film was shown nationwide in Israel in the cinema in December of the same year. It was also nominated for the Ophir Award as Best Documentary under 60 minutes

== Awards and nominations ==
=== Awards ===
- 2014: Filmmakers of the Year Film Festival – Documentary and Short International Movie Awards – Gold: Best film

=== Nominations ===
- 2014: Indian Cine Film Festival Mumbai: Best film (jury)
- 2015: Ophir Award, Best Documentary under 60 minutes
- 2015: Cayman Islands International Film Festival, Best feature documentary
- 2015: Tupelo Film Festival, Best Documentary
- 2015: International Filmmaker Festival of World Cinema in Milán, Best director

== Follow-up films ==
Dvorit Shargal made two more films dealing with Anna Riwkin-Brick's Children's Everywhere series.

=== Africa! Sia Lives on Kilimanjaro ===
Africa! Sia Lives on Kilimanjaro (Hebrew סיאה הילדה מאפריקה) was released on August 5, 2016. In the film the director Shargal drove again to the Astrid Lindgren archive in Stockholm. She talked to Astrid Lindgren's daughter Karin Nyman to learn more about Anna Riwkin-Brick and her books, but Karin Nyman could not tell Shargal much about her. At a screening of Where Is Elle Kari and What Happened to Noriko-san? a member of the audience said that she had the name and email address from "Sia" from Sia Lives on Kilimanjaro. The e-mail address turned out to be wrong, but Shargal managed to find Sia, who is actually called Erica Malekia. Shargal met Erica Malekia's family and found out more about their culture and their lives in Tanzania.

=== Where Is Lilibet the Circus Child and What Happened in Honolulu? ===
Where Is Lilibet the Circus Child and What Happened in Honolulu? (Hebrew: איפה לילבס ילדת הקרקס ומה קרה בהונולולו?) was released on October 20, 2017. Once again Shargal tried to find more protagonists of the Children's Everywhere series in the archive of Astrid Lindgren in Stockholm. There she found out that Lilibet from Lilibet, Circus Child, had performed in a circus called Cirkus Scott. Shargal visited the circus, but the circus director did not know Lilibet. He later promised Shargal to try to find out more about the girl. In the meantime Shargal met Eva Brick, the niece of Anna Riwkin-Brick. She found out more about the family and life of the photographer Anne Riwkin-Brik. She discovered that Anna Riwkin-Brick had flown to Hawaii with her sister Eugénie Söderberg to create a photo book about the girl Mokihana (Mokihana Lives in Hawaii). Immediately Shargal flew to Hawaii to find that girl. At first, her search was unsuccessful, but then she met an elderly gentleman who knew the book and reported that Anna and her sister lived in Hawaii for several months and his son was also photographed for the photo book. The search near Mokihana turned out to be more difficult than expected, but shortly before her departure Shargal managed to meet her. Shargal came from Hawaii directly to Sweden, where she learned the name of Lilibet and her father. In addition, she came in contact with Lilibets half-brother. She learned that Lilibet is actually called Ingrid Heinrich and now lives in Bussum, Holland. Shargal visited her in Holland. Ingrid Heinrich told Shargal about her work with Astrid Lindgren and Anna Riwkin-Brick, as well as her life in the circus.
