= Vi (magazine) =

Swedish lifestyle magazine

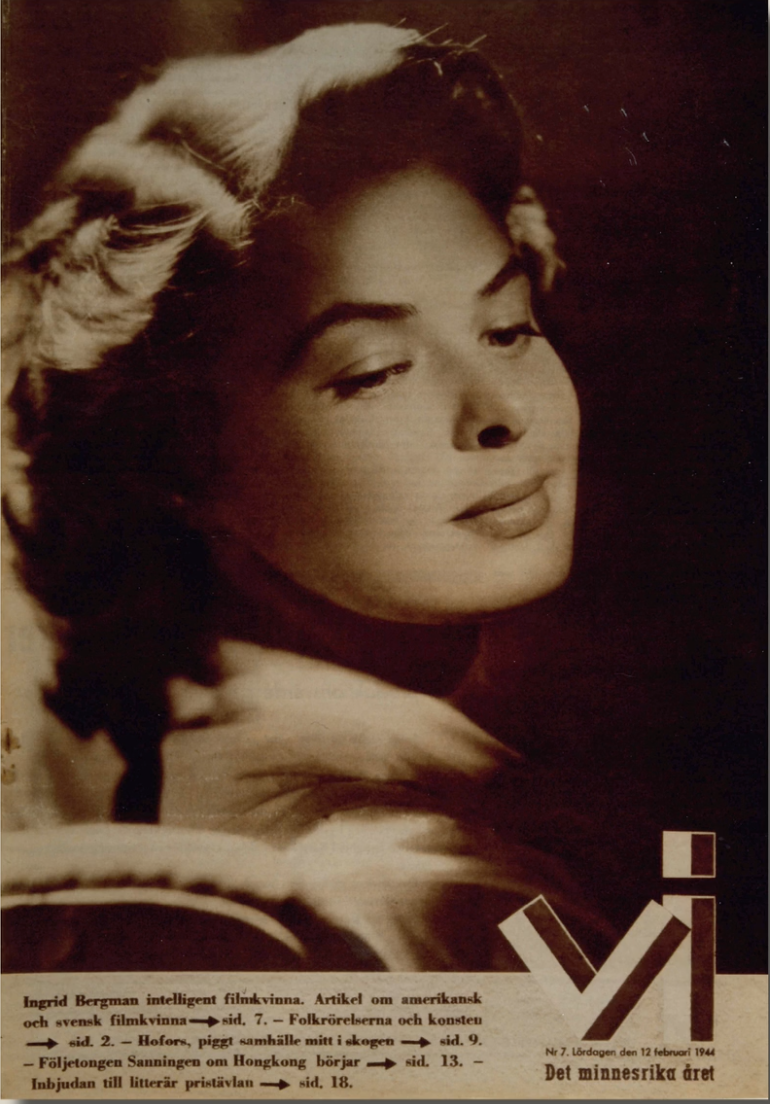
- Vi magazine cover, 12 February 1944
- Frequency: monthly
- Format: magazine
- Publisher: Bonnier Publications AB
- Paid circulation: 37,200
- First issue: 1913
- Company: Kooperativa Förbundet
- Country: Sweden
- Based in: Stockholm,
- Language: Swedish
- Website: https://vi.se/
- ISSN: 0346-4180

Vi is a Swedish lifestyle magazine founded in 1913. It is headquartered in Stockholm.

== History ==
A cooperative association founded the newspaper Konsumentbladet ('Consumer Magazine') in 1913, which at first was a weekly newspaper of four pages with editorials, articles, cartoons, a short story and reviews about cooperatives and household economics. From January 1914, regular publication started, immediately achieving a circulation of 40,000 copies.

In 1924, the ideological content was reduced and Konsumentbladet was transformed into a family newspaper "for Sweden's household" and its circulation rose to 300,000 copies.

It was retitled Vi (in English; 'We') in 1937, in accord with the adoption of short titles and striking mastheads by the abundance of picture magazines of the era, like LIFE (1936) and LOOK (1937) in the US, Post (1938) and Lilliput (1937) in the UK (1938), and Vu (1928) and Regards (1932) in France, and a corresponding commitment to a house style based on New Typography made by Vi's publisher Kooperativa Förbundet. Rune Hassner writes:

"Only a handful of illustrated periodicals have actually significantly deviated from the standard pattern of the popular press and more consciously sought to use the photographic image reportage to inform about social conditions and political or economic issues that vitally affected the readers' own well-being. At the same time, several of these magazines have become forerunners in terms of tight, efficient image presentation and high image quality. Among them can be mentioned the German-founded Arbeiter Illustrierte-Zeitung (A-I-Z), the Soviet Russian SSSR na Strojke (U S S R in Construction), the French weekly Vu and two of the main exponents of the popular weekly press in Europe in the 1930s, the English Picture Post and Weekly Illustrated, The Survey in the USA and the Swedish weekly Vi."

== Ethos ==
Vi was subtitled "the weekly newspaper owned by its readership". First editor-in-chief Seved Apelqvist in Vi no. 18, 1945, announced the magazine's intentions:

"Vi will amuse and entertain without dumbing down. We want to reflect the reality of the present but not falsify it. […] We want to broaden horizons.”

In the 1980s Vi magazine initiated a tree planting project, the Vi-skogen ('Vi forest'), in the countries around Lake Victoria in Africa. One who inspired the project was Harry Lindquist. The project, using readers' donations, plants trees to prevent desertification. By 2006 over 100 million trees had been planted involving 1.5 million people who at the same time have benefited from better living conditions.

== Content ==
=== Photography ===
Known for its photojournalism, Vi published many Swedish photographers, such as Hans Malmberg, Georg Oddner and Tore Johnson (members of the agency Tio fotografer) early in their careers. Photographer Anna Riwkin in 1942, and working for Vi, traveled to Lapland for a report on a Sami village. She and the journalist Elly Jannes returned several times, resulting in books about Sami life and the very popular children's book Elle Kari. Having established himself in 1938, until 1946, Karl W. Gullers contributed pictures to Vi, with a cover story 'The Black Metropolis,' and also wrote articles himself. In the spring of 1945 he made around 30 photographs in Malmö of the arrival on white buses of former Nazi concentration camp survivors for the magazine. The impact of his photographs influenced the Swedish aid effort.

Stefan Gurt, in his Så dödar vi en människa ('That's how we kill a human being') remembers;

"The Swedish image of China is often strange. The country is so far away and the culture is so foreign that it is easy to use it as a canvas on which to project wishful dreams or fears ... I remember a picture of a group of uniformed twelve-year-olds in Vi magazine, when I was little you got it if you were a member of Konsum. The children lunged with bayonets, their faces contorted with rage. - The caption explained that in China they had to educate children that way because Chinese people lack natural aggression."

=== Writing ===
Vi specialised in contemporary social reportage and fiction by authors including Evert Taube, Stig Dagerman, Vilhelm Moberg, Karin Boye, Nils Ferlin, Moa Martinson, Lubbe Nordström and Ivar Lo-Johansson, who in 1949 campaigned for improved living conditions for the elderly, and more recently Karolina Ramqvist and Anna-Karin Palm. Children's literature was included through collaboration with Astrid Lindgren (author of Pippi Longstocking) to publish extracts from her series on mischievous children in an old-fashioned village, Barnen i Bullerbyn ('The children in Bullerbyn'). Lennart Hellsing's stories appeared with illustrations by Stig Lindberg.

The 12 February 1944 cover displayed a portrait of "Ingrid Bergman, intelligent film woman," announcing an article on "women in American and Swedish film," and others titled "Folk movements and art;" "Hofors, lively community in the middle of the forest;" "The truth about Hong Kong;" and invited readers to enter a literary prize competition.

The magazine in 1942, against criticism from Stockholms-Tidningen, conducted the first opinion polls in Sweden.

== Postwar ==
In 1947 Vi achieved its largest circulation; 676,000 copies, corresponding to 40 percent of Sweden's households.

From the 1950s, more space was devoted to photographs and foreign reportage and environmental journalism increased, though it did not lose sight of its original identity as a consumer magazine. It was the first in Sweden to present a translation of Rachel Carson's Silent Spring. In 1974, it published Anna-Britt Agnsäter's pioneering food pyramid, which would later be adapted for use internationally.

In 1988, the magazine, loss-making during the economic downturn of the 1970s, was spun off from the Kooperativa Förbundet, and is today viably profitable in the hands of AB Tidningen Vi, owned by the Kooperativa Förbundet. By the 1990s Stefan Andhé, in Läsning för smått desperata ('Reading for the slightly desperate') was describing Vi as "Konsum's provincial old membership magazine that has gone and become a wise but worldly 90s weekly magazine, almost suave."

== 21st century ==
In 2005, the magazine switched from fortnightly to monthly publication and a modern glossy format.

In 2006, a series of articles, Vändpunkten (lit. 'Turning point') began, in which famous and ordinary people talked about events that caused their lives to change direction, which in the case of Michael Nuquist, generated an audio book.

In 2008, the sister magazine Vi läser was started.

2011, a period renewal under the editorship of Sofia Wadensjö Karén saw the creation of a new position of senior editor was established and was taken up by Stina Jofs, who in 2007 was nominated for the Stora Journalistpriset in the category "Storyteller of the Year".

== Prizes and awards ==
In 1975, Lars Westman for his articles on Swedish trials received the Stora Journalist prize, awarded also in 1977 to Stig Edling and Hans Nestius for their review of the National Board of Health and Welfare. In 2007, the newspaper won the prize for Magazine of the Year in the category popular press under 50,000 copies, which is awarded by the industry organization Publishingpriset. The jury's justification was "A classic that manages to maintain its high quality year after year".

Vi itself has, since 1947, offered the Tidningen Vi:s litteraturpris, a monetary award increased to SEK 50,000 in 2008 (a value in 2022 of US$4,427), and diploma, for Swedish fiction writers. From 1947–1991, the newspaper received scholarship funds from the Kooperativa Förbundet book publishing house and the Boklotteriet (Book Lottery) 1948–1965 which continued as the Litteraturfrämjandet ('Promotion of literature') until 1992 after which the magazine alone has been responsible for the entire scholarship amount.

== Editors-in-Chief ==
- 1933–1945: Seved Apelqvist
- 1945–1959: Nils Thedin
- 1959–1966: Birger Lundberg
- 1966–1968: Orjan Wallqvist
- 1968–1970: Bo Präntare
- 1970–1978: Sten Lundgren
- 1979–1982: Allan Larsson
- 1982–1987: Monica Boëthius
- 1988–1992: Mats Ekdahl
- 1992–2004: Göran Gynne
- 2005–2010: Anneli Rogeman
- 2011–2018: Sofia Wadensjö Karén
- 2018–2019: Markus Wilhelmson (acting)
- 2019– Unn Edberg
