= Daniel Brick =

Swedish journalist, writer, and public intellectual

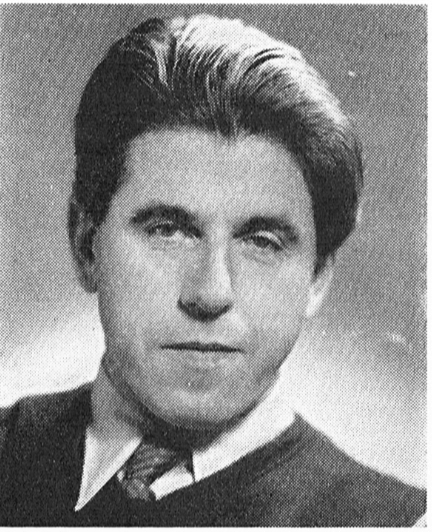
- Born: March 23, 1903; Stockholm, Sweden
- Died: January 19, 1987 (aged 83); Danderyd, Sweden
- Occupations: Journalist, writer, translator, editor
- Spouse(s): Anna Riwkin (1929–1970, her death); Taube Mirsky (1980–)

Daniel Brick (23 March 1903 – 19 January 1987) was a Swedish journalist, editor, translator, public intellectual, and a leading voice in Jewish cultural life in 20th-century Sweden.

== Biography ==
Daniel Brick was born to Elias David Brick, a merchant, and Maria Klara Brick (née Burstein), Lithuanian-Jewish immigrants who had arrived in Sweden via Finland. He was the twelfth of thirteen siblings. The family moved from Stockholm to Norrköping in 1905, returning to the capital around 1910. Brick studied at Norra Latin and earned a bachelor's degree in literature history from Stockholm University in 1929.

That same year, he married the photographer Anna Riwkin, sister of his close collaborator and fellow translator Josef Riwkin. Their home became a hub for modernist and radical intellectual circles in Stockholm.

Brick became a central figure in Sweden’s Jewish cultural scene. He co-founded the magazine Judisk Krönika (lit. 'Jewish Chronicle') in 1932 and served as its editor-in-chief until 1979. He was also general secretary of the Zionist Organization in Sweden from 1935 to 1948. In 1952, a forest was planted in his honor in Israel. In 1957, he established the Jewish Cultural Institute (Judiska Kulturinstitutet) in Stockholm, a space for interfaith dialogue and intellectual exchange.

During the interwar years, Brick published several pamphlets confronting antisemitism, including Why Are the Jews Always Blamed? (1939, 1944) and Against Antisemitism: Swedish Authors Take a Stand (1943). He contributed to the Nordisk familjebok and lectured frequently on Jewish and Zionist topics. Known for his fierce engagement in public debate, he was described posthumously as “a fighter, unafraid to make enemies.”

In 1980, ten years after the death of Anna Riwkin-Brick in 1970, he remarried Taube Mirsky. He died on 19 January 1987.

== Work as Translator ==
During the 1920s and 1930s, Brick translated a number of works from Russian, Yiddish, and Czech into Swedish—often in collaboration with others. He played a major role in introducing Soviet and East European modernist literature to Swedish readers. His best-known translation is that of The Good Soldier Švejk by Jaroslav Hašek, published in 1930–1931. While the translation was based largely on the German edition and contains some inaccuracies, it was an enormous popular success and was reprinted repeatedly through the late 20th century.

== Selected works ==
=== Writings ===
- Varför anklagar man judarna? (Why Are the Jews Always Blamed?), Internationella kvinnoförbundet för fred och frihet, 1939
- Antisemitismen – en folkfara (Antisemitism – A Danger to Society), Kämpande demokrati, 1943

=== Translations (selected) ===
- Isaac Leib Peretz: Två världar: noveller (Two Worlds: Stories), from Yiddish (with Aisik Libman), 1926
- Nikolaj Ognev: Kostia Rjabtsevs dagbok (Kostia Ryabtsev’s Diary), with Josef Riwkin, 1929
- 14 sovjetryska berättare (14 Soviet Russian Authors), with Josef Riwkin, 1929
- Jaroslav Hašek: Den tappre soldaten Švejks äventyr under världskriget (The Good Soldier Švejk), 1931
- Jerzy Kossowski: Tegelhuset (The Brick House), with Eugénie Söderberg, 1932
- Leon Pinsker: Självbefrielse (Auto-Emancipation), 1937
