= Frank Perls =

Frank Richard Perls (October 23, 1910 – February 9, 1975) was a German-born American art dealer who was best known for uncovering a series of fraudulent art works. As an interpreter with the United States Third Army, Perls worked together with Army intelligence officer Martin Dannenberg in April 1945 in the discovery of a copy of the 1935 Nuremberg Laws signed by Adolf Hitler.

== Early life ==
Perls was born on October 23, 1910, in Berlin, where his father, Hugo Perls, ran an art gallery. He attended the University of Freiburg, majoring in art history, and joined his mother in 1932 at the Kaethe Perls Gallery in Paris. He emigrated to the United States in 1937 and together with his brother Klaus established the Perls Galleries in Manhattan. He opened his own gallery in Hollywood in 1939 and later relocated his place of business to Wilshire Boulevard in Beverly Hills, California.

== Army interpreter ==
During World War II, Perls served in the infantry of the United States Army, participating in the Normandy landings, where he served as an interpreter. He and Army intelligence officer Martin Dannenberg were directed by an informant to a bank vault in Eichstätt, Bavaria, where they discovered an original copy of the 1935 Nuremberg Laws signed by Adolf Hitler. Dannenberg recounted that Perls had tears in his eyes when he realized the enormity of their find and the fact that it was two Jews who had made the discovery. They turned the document in to Third Army headquarters and it made its way up the chain of command to General George S. Patton. Patton kept the document for himself and donated it to The Huntington Library in San Marino, California, where it was kept in a bank vault for 54 years. First put on public display at the Skirball Cultural Center in 1999, the document was donated to the United States National Archives in 2010.

== Discovery of art forgeries ==
Perls was a personal friend of Pablo Picasso and the family of Henri Matisse. In 1967, Perls was responsible for uncovering a series of unauthorized casts made of six bronze sculptures by Alberto Giacometti. That same year, he concluded that there were 44 forged pieces included in a group of 58 purchased for $1 million by oilman and art collector Algur H. Meadows, including works that had been attributed to Marc Chagall, Edgar Degas and Picasso.

In an auction held in 1968 at Parke-Bernet, Perls acquired "Still Life with a Poem" by Juan Gris for $120,000 and Georges Rouault's "Le Chinois" for $92,000, setting records for works by both artists purchased at auction. He served as director of the Art Dealers Association of America and was made a life fellow of the Los Angeles County Museum of Art.

Perls died at age 64 on February 9, 1975, in Beverly Hills after having undergone open heart surgery three months earlier.

== Sale of Nazi-looted art ==
Perls' sale of a stolen Pissarro painting, Rue Saint-Honoré in the Afternoon, Effect of Rain, first to Sidney Brody, and then, later, to Knoedler, resulted in a famous lawsuit, in which the heirs of a Jewish family plundered by the Nazis sued the Thyssen Museum, which had eventually acquired the painting. The Cassirer v. Thyssen-Bornemisza Collection Foundation case has been litigated for nearly two decades, most recently in the United States Supreme Court.
