= Margarete Eisenmann =

Jewish art collector and Holocaust victim (1868–1942)

Margarete Eisenmann (1868 – 1942) was a Jewish art collector and Holocaust victim.

== Life ==
Eisenmann was born in Berlin. Her father was de Wilhelm (Wolf) von Ledermann-Wartberg and her mother was Elise von Ledermann-Wartberg. She married Felix Samuel Eisenmann. The couple had one son, Günther Bernhard Eisenmann. Her father-in-law was Raphael Eisenmann. It was from him that she inherited the Lucas Cranach the Elder's painting, The Resurrection (1530).

== Nazi persecution ==
When the Nazis come to power in German in 1933, Eisenmann and her family were persecuted because of their Jewish heritage. She was, in accordance with Hitler's anti-Jewish laws, robbed of her property and forced to pay a Jewish Wealth Tax, or Judenvermögensabgabe, instated under the Nazi regime in 1938. The tax required German Jews with an annual income over RM 5,000 to pay 20 percent of their assets to the state. Eisenmann was arrested and sent to the Theresienstadt Ghetto in September 1942 and killed at the Treblinka concentration camp. Her estate was seized and auctioned off.

Eisenmann's son Günther and grandson Percy Henschel survived Nazi persecution.

== Claims for restitution of looted artworks ==
After the war, in 1949, the looted Cranach painting resurfaced in a Sotheby's sale in London, where it had been consigned by dealer Hans W. Lange, whose auction house was known for forced sales of Jewish-owned property. It passed through the hands of New York dealers Hugo Perls and the Knoedler gallery before Eugene Thaw bought it around 1968.

Eisenmann's son and grandson attempted to recover the Cranach. No other works from the family's estate are known to have been successfully recovered. Henschel died in 2007.

"The last time it was seen, it was hanging on a wall in Hitler's chancellery," he said in an interview with the Guardian a year before he died. . "This painting represents all that I lost."

A settlement was reached concerning the Cranach in 2021.

== See also ==
- The Holocaust
- List of claims for restitution for Nazi-looted art
- Rudolf Heinemann
