= Hermann Heller (legal scholar) =

German philosopher and legal scholar (1891–1933)

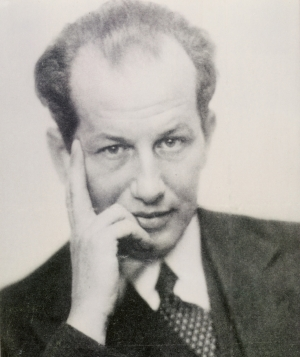
- Born: Hermann Ignatz Heller; 17 July 1891; Teschen, Silesia, Austria-Hungary
- Died: 5 November 1933 (aged 42); Madrid, Spain
- Occupation: Jurist
- Spouse: Gertrud Falke
- Partner: Elisabeth Langgässer
- Children: Gertrud "Jane" Heller Winikus; Ruth Heller; Cordelia Edvardson; Lukas Heller
- Relatives: Bruno Heller (grandson); Zoë Heller (granddaughter)

Hermann Heller (17 July 1891 – 5 November 1933) was a German legal scholar and philosopher of Jewish descent. He was active in the non-Marxist wing of the Social Democratic Party of Germany (SPD) during the Weimar Republic. He attempted to formulate the theoretical foundations of the social-democratic relations to the state, and nationalism. He was politically active in the relatively conservative Hofgeismarer Kreis of the SPD and is believed to have authored the group's statement of principles.

== Biography ==
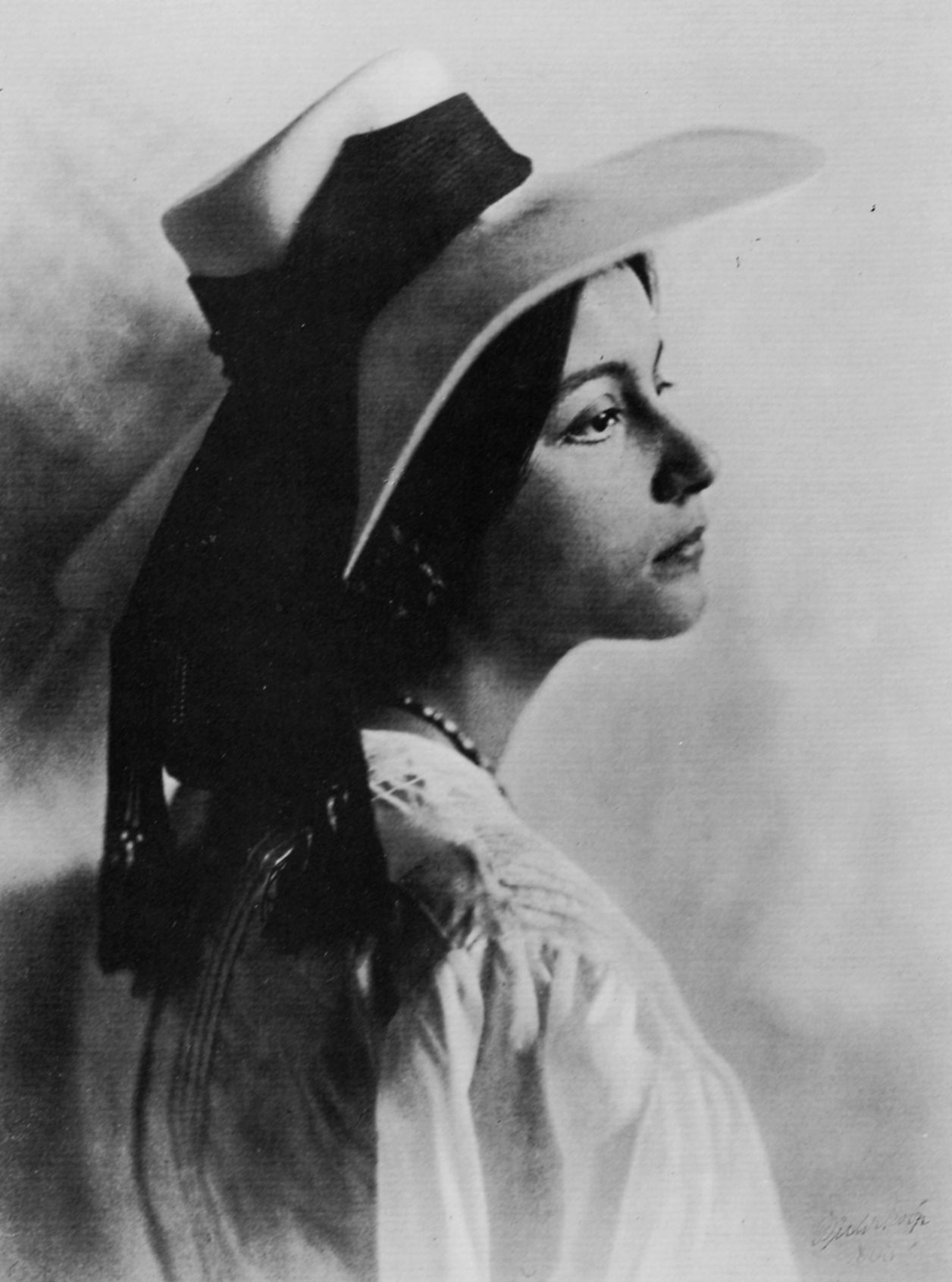
Hermann Heller's wife Gertrud Falke (1891–1984) in 1908.

Heller was born in Teschen, Austrian Silesia. In World War I he volunteered for the army, served in an Austro-Hungarian artillery regiment and got a heart disease at the front. In 1921 Heller was married to the dancer Gertrud Falke (daughter of famed German poet Gustav Falke). They had three children, Jane, Ruth, and Lukas. Lucy Heller, Bruno Heller, Emily Heller, and Zoë Heller are his grandchildren. In 1928 Heller had a short relationship with Elisabeth Langgässer. Their daughter, Cordelia, was born in 1929.

=== Work ===
In his short life, he was involved in a number of political debates and controversies, most notably with Hans Kelsen, Carl Schmitt and Max Adler. In short, Heller's theories are both a reinterpretation of Hegelian social theory and an emendation of Eduard Bernstein's revisionism. Heller calls for the integration of the working class in the social, cultural and political structures of the nation-state. Against Carl Schmitt he argued that it is not so much the state of emergency, but rather the state of social and political stability which defines the sovereign. He is generally perceived to have been a major influence on Carlo Schmid who, in turn, drafted most of the German Constitution and was the main force behind the reform of the SPD.

=== Legacy ===
Heller was forced to go into exile to Spain in 1933 with his wife and children, and died in Madrid in the same year, leaving his magnum opus, Staatslehre, unfinished. His collected works, in three volumes, have been published by Mohr Verlag of Tübingen.

Recently, there has been a renewed interest in Heller's work, especially in Germany. Some of his work has been translated into English. His views have been influential in both Japan and the Spanish-speaking world. Among political scientists who study democracy, liberalism and authoritarianism, Heller's work has had a renewed interest in the 2010s and in the 2020s. They attribute the origin of the term "authoritarian liberalism" to a 1933 article by him.
