= Svenskt författarlexikon =

Swedish biobibliographical dictionary

- Language: Swedish
- Subject: Biobibliography
- Genre: Nonfiction
- Publisher: Rabén & Sjögren
- Publication date: 1942–1981
- Publication place: Sweden
- Media type: Biographical dictionary
- Pages: 5348
- OCLC: 976739822

Svenskt författarlexikon, subtitled Biobibliografisk handbok till Sveriges moderna litteratur, is a Swedish biobibliographical dictionary of Swedish-language authors published by Rabén & Sjögren between 1942 and 1981, covering the years 1900–1975 in seven parts in ten volumes.

The first part in three volumes was published in 1942 under the direction of Bengt Åhlén (1897–1955). The first two volumes (935 pages) are a biographical dictionary of Swedish-language (Swedish, Finnish-Swedish and Swedish-American) fiction writers who were active in 1900 to 1940. The aim was to include all authors who have published any work of fiction of at least 16 pages in length. The length of the articles varies from a few lines to 13 pages (August Strindberg). In addition to works of fiction, non-fiction (under the heading Varia) and translations are also listed. However, those who are strictly translators are not included. The third volume is an alphabetical index of book titles (427 pages) and author pseudonyms (20 pages) as well as the authors' place of residence in various regions (36 pages).

| Part | Scope of the volume | Pages | Published | Editor | Contributors |
|---|---|---|---|---|---|
| 1 | 1900–1940: A–L | 523 | 1942 | Bengt Åhlén | Carl Thore Fries (born 1909), Paul Harnesk (1903–1965), Agneta Lönborg |
| | 1900–1940: M–Ö | 412 | 1942 | Bengt Åhlén | Carl Thore Fries (born 1909), Paul Harnesk (1903–1965), Agneta Lönborg |
| | 1900–1940: Index | 496 | 1942 | Bengt Åhlén | Carl Thore Fries (born 1909), Paul Harnesk (1903–1965), Agneta Lönborg |
| 2 | 1941–1950: A–Ö | 690 | 1953 | Bengt Åhlén | |
| 3 | 1951–1955: A–Ö | 436 | 1959 | Bengt Åhlén (died 1955), Agneta Åhlén (born 1913) | |
| | 1941–1955: Index | 274 | 1959 | Agneta Åhlén | Carl Thore Fries |
| 4 | 1956–1960 | 563 | 1963 | Paul Harnesk | Bengt Lundblad (born 1918), Lisbet Höök |
| 5 | 1961–1965 | 534 | 1968 | Bengt Lundblad | Edvard Söderlund, Torsten Lönegren (born 1913) |
| 6 | 1966–1970 | 707 | 1975 | Bengt Lundblad, Torsten Lönegren | |
| 7 | 1971–1975 | 713 | 1981 | Bengt Lundblad, Torsten Lönegren | |
| Total | | 5348 | | | |

== Similar biographical dictionaries ==
- Eva Björling, Svenskt barnboksförfattarlexikon ('Dictionary of Swedish Children's Authors') (1977), covering 1960–1974 (in Swedish)
- Svend Dahl, Povl Engelstoft, Dansk skønlitterært forfatterleksikon 1900–1950 ('Dictionary of Danish Fiction Authors') (three parts, 1959–1964) (in Danish)
