= Hugo Perls =

German art dealer and historian (1886–1977)

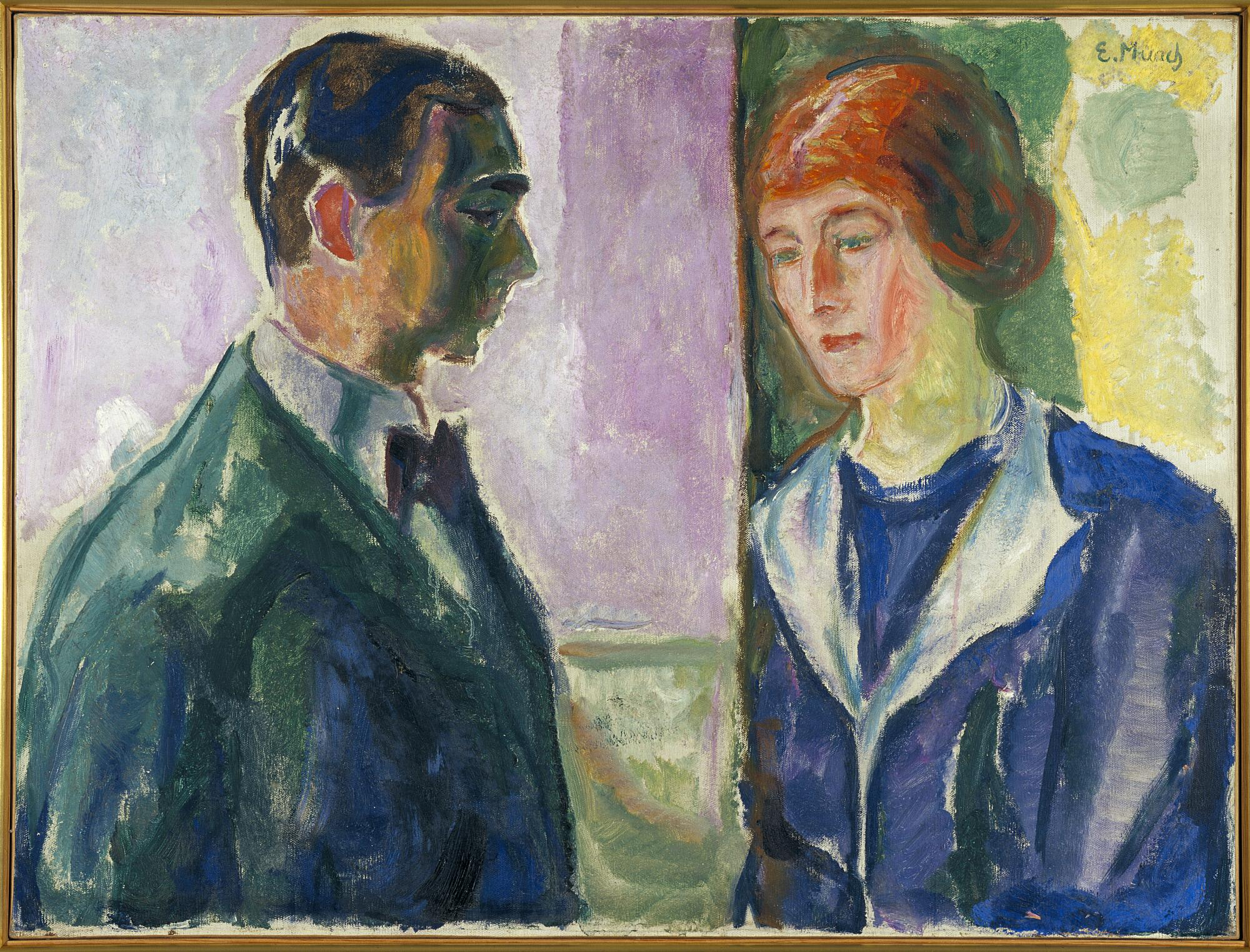
- Born: 1886
- Died: 1977; New York City
- Occupations: Philosopher, art dealer, art collector, jurist, writer
- Spouse(s): Käte Perls, Eugénie Söderberg
- Children: Klaus Perls

Hugo Perls (24 May 1886–1977 was an international art dealer, historian, philosopher and notable collector born in Rybnik in Upper Silesia. During his lifetime, he witnessed his homeland change from its German origins to Polish. He studied law, philosophy, and art history at the University of Freiburg and in Berlin. On completion of his studies he joined the German civil service and worked for the Ministry of the Interior prior to serving in the German Foreign Office during World War I. Perls married his first wife Kaethe in 1910.

== Early career ==
Perls began collecting artwork in 1914 and was working as a professional art dealer by 1921. He established the Kaethe Perls Gallery in Berlin and collected and sold the works of many famous artists, particularly impressionists, including Edvard Munch, Pablo Picasso, Claude Monet, Vincent van Gogh, and Paul Cézanne, among others. A portrait was painted of Perls and his wife Kaethe by Munch in 1913.

In 1931, Perls moved back to Paris because of the rise of Nazi Germany. He engaged himself in scholastic activities studying the works of Plato in their original Greek and also the works of Goethe and Kant. Following this research he was himself inspired to compose several articles regarding Plato, his philosophy and aesthetics. These pieces were published in a number of French philosophical journals and he went on to give lectures on Plato at the Sorbonne. His first book: L'Art et la Beauté vus par Platon was published in 1938 as a result of his scholastic research.

== Later life ==
Perls immigrated to the United States in 1941 during World War II and lived in Manhattan, the same year that he married his second wife the Swedish writer Eugénie Söderberg (1903–1973). The Perls Galleries in New York City had been established by his son Klaus Perls in 1937 and during this time Perls may have assisted his son in the acquisition of artwork. In 1939, the Frank Perls Gallery was opened by his eldest son in southern California and Perls briefly lived in Italy and traveled in Europe to further study collections of paintings after World War II. A third son, Thomas A. Perls, a physicist, was born to Hugo and Kaethe in Berlin in 1923.

Following World War II and until his death, Perls concentrated on writing and publishing. Most of his works concerned Plato and his philosophy and their conceptual application to the judgment and appreciation of art. His most significant work Platon: sa conception du kosmos was originally published in 1946. This book was republished in German twenty years later and based on Perl's studies, while living in Paris, of Plato's original writings. His published works included the discussion of aesthetics and the relationship between beauty and art although Die Komödie der Wahrheit (The Comedy of Truth) also featured other topics such as German intellectualism and the growth of Antisemitism.

After Perls's wife Eugénie died in New York City in 1973, he married for a third time, to writer Monica Schall. Hugo Perls died in New York in 1977.

== Otto Wacker forgeries ==
Perls was sued by the Hamburg art collector Elsa Wolf-Essberger for selling forgeries of Vincent van Gogh paintings from Otto Wacker. According to the art historian Stefan Koldehoff, Perls "owned 11 of the Wacker fakes".

== Nazi-era restitution claims ==
In 2021 the estate of Eugene Thaw reached a settlement agreement with the heirs of Margarete Eisenmann concerning Lucas Cranach the Elder's The Resurrection which had passed through Hugo Perls and the Knoedler gallery before reaching Thaw. Eisenmann was deported to Theriesenstandt in September 1942 and killed at the Treblinka concentration camp.

== Works ==
- Mousa, étude sur l'esthétique de Platon, Revue Philosophique (Paris), March 1934.
- Mousa, étude sur l'esthétique de Platon, (second article) Revue Philosophique (Paris), March 1934.
- La Philosophie de Droit dans l'Oeuvre de Platon, Revue Philosophique (Paris), 1936.
- La Savoir et la Foi Religieuse dans l'oeuvre de Platon, Mercure de France (Paris), 1938.
- L'Art et la Beauté vus par Platon, Paris: Skira, 1938.
- Platon, sa conception du Kosmos, New York: Edition de la Maison Française, 1945.
- Le Tyran d'aprés Platon, Oeuvres Nouvelles (New York), 1946.
- Platon et Kant, Les 2 Concepts de Cause in Revue de Métaphysique et de Morale (Paris), 1937.
- Le Triomphe de la Beauté, Pagine Nuove (Rome), 1948.
- Le Secret de l'Art dans l'oeuvre de Goethe, Revue Philosophique (Paris), 1948.
- Das Geheimnis der Kunst, Zürich: Artemis, 1959.
- L'esthétique de Goethe, Revue Philosophique (Paris), 1960–1962.
- Warum ist Kamilla schön?, Munich: Paul List Verlag, 1962.
- Plato, seine Auffassung vom Kosmos, Bern: Francke Verlag, 1966.
- Die Komödie der Wahrheit, Bern: Francke Verlag, 1967.
- Goethes Ästhetik und andere Aufsätze zur Literatur und Philosophie, Bern: Francke Verlag, 1969.
- Lexikon der platonischen Begriffe, Bern: Francke Verlag, 1973.
