= Eugene V. Thaw =

American art collector and philanthropist (1927–2018)

Eugene Victor Thaw
- Born: October 27, 1927; New York, New York, U.S.
- Died: January 3, 2018 (aged 90); Cherry Valley, New York, U.S.
- Education: DeWitt Clinton High School; St. John's College
- Occupations: Art dealer and collector
- Spouse: Clare Eddy
- Children: one son

Eugene Victor Thaw (October 27, 1927 – January 3, 2018) was an American art dealer and collector. He was the owner of an art gallery on Madison Avenue in Manhattan, and a past president of the Art Dealers Association of America. With his wife, Clare, he donated over 1,000 works of art to the Fenimore Art Museum and the Morgan Library & Museum.

== Early life ==
Thaw was born on October 27, 1927, in Washington Heights, Manhattan, New York City. His father was a heating contractor and his mother a schoolteacher. Thaw was educated at the DeWitt Clinton High School in Brooklyn and St. John's College in Annapolis.

== Career ==
Thaw opened an art gallery and bookstore on West 44th Street at the Algonquin Hotel in 1950. He moved the gallery to Madison Avenue in 1954, He sold artwork to private collectors like Paul Mellon and Norton Simon as well as institutions like the Art Institute of Chicago, the Cleveland Museum of Art, the National Gallery of Art.

Thaw was a co-founder of the Art Dealers Association of America in 1962, and he served as its president from 1970 to 1972. He was an honorary trustee of the Metropolitan Museum of Art and the Morgan Library & Museum.

Thaw was also an art collector. Thaw's collection included drawings from modern and old masters, American Indian art, ancient Eurasian bronzes, early medieval jewelry, Native American art, architectural models, and eighteenth- and nineteenth-century oil sketches, French faience, in addition to paintings, sculpture, and furniture. He was the owner of drawings and paintings by Paul Cézanne, Joseph Cornell, Salvador Dalí, Honoré Daumier, Edgar Degas, Eugène Delacroix, Jean-Honoré Fragonard, Alberto Giacometti, Vincent van Gogh, Francisco Goya, Lee Krasner, Georgia O'Keeffe, Pablo Picasso, and Jackson Pollock, Odilon Redon, Rembrandt, as well as Native American art. With his wife, he donated 870 works of American Indian art to the Fenimore Art Museum. They also donated more than 400 works to the Morgan Library & Museum.

In 1985 and 1986 a group of small format paintings from the Thaw collection was exhibited at The Pierpont Morgan Library and the Virginia Museum of Fine Arts alongside drawings, bronzes, objets de vertu and faience, to present an idea of their additional interests as collectors.

In 2008, The Cooper Hewitt National Design Museum held an exhibition titled "House Proud", that commemorated a substantial gift made by Eugene and Clare Thaw of eighty five nineteenth-century exquisitely detailed watercolors of domestic interiors, the largest collection of this subject matter in America. The selection was ultimately shown in Paris at [[Musée de la Vie romantique]] in 2012-2013.

The Morgan Library & Museum published a collection of his articles as Reflections of an Independent Mind in 1997. The book predominantly contains book reviews from 1980 to 1995 (including a very negative review of Suzi Gablik's Has Modernism Failed?), but also articles on collecting (1977-1995), museums and auction houses (1977-1990), and essays on Vincent Van Gogh (1980, 1984), Paul Cézanne (1984), Edgar Degas (1985), John Cheever (1982), Ralph F. Colin (1985), Pierre Matisse (1989), János Scholz (1993, 1995), John Rewald (1994), and Lore Heinemann (1997). These articles originally appeared in periodicals such as The New Republic, The New York Review of Books, The New York Times Book Review, The Times, The Spectator, The New Criterion, Heritage, ARTnews, and The American Scholar, as well as book editions of art works in his collection.

== Personal life and death ==
Thaw married Clare Eddy in 1954. They resided in Cherry Valley, New York, and on Park Avenue in New York City, as well as in Santa Fe, New Mexico, from 1987 to 2013. They had a son, Nicholas.

While living in Santa Fe, the Thaws purchased the Wind River Ranch outside Watrous, New Mexico, for recreational use. In 2004, Eugene Thaw began to explore the possibility of donating the ranch to a non-governmental organization (NGO) for use in conservation and education efforts. He initially approached the Wildlife Conservation Society, but it rejected his offer. In 2005 he created the Wind River Ranch Foundation to carry out conservation, restoration, research, and educational functions on the land. Between 2007 and 2010, he offered the ranch property to several NGOs, but the economic effects of the Great Recession of 2007–2009 made them reluctant to accept it without a full endowment. In 2010, the United States Fish and Wildlife Service (USFWS) approached the discouraged Thaw and offered to purchase the ranch from him and establish a new National Wildlife Refuge on it to be named the Rio Mora National Wildlife Refuge. Thaw countered that he would donate — rather than sell — the land to the USFWS for the purpose of establishing the refuge if it agreed to use the refuge designation to preserve native species and allow the Pueblo of Pojoaque, a Native American tribe, to continue to graze its American bison on the land. Budget cuts between 2010 and 2012 left the USFWS without the funds necessary to staff the proposed refuge, so in 2012 Thaw donated US$1,715,000 to the Denver Zoo in Denver, Colorado, so that the zoo could staff and manage the refuge for the Fish and Wildlife Service through the end of 2019. With the financial arrangements and legal requirements complete, the Thaws donated the Wind River Ranch to the USFWS on September 27, 2012, for use in protecting the Mora River watershed and providing education about the natural and cultural heritage of the area. The same day, United States Secretary of the Interior Ken Salazar dedicated the Rio Mora National Wildlife Refuge on the property.

Thaw's wife Clare died in June 2017. Thaw himself died on January 3, 2018, in Cherry Valley, at age 90. Two hundred of his works were auctioned by Christie's on October 30, 2018.

== Nazi-era restitution claims ==
In 2021 the estate of Eugene Thaw reached a settlement agreement with the heirs of Margarete Eisenmann concerning the painting by Lucas Cranach the Elder, The Resurrection. Eisenmann was deported to Theriesenstandt in September 1942 and killed at the Treblinka concentration camp. Her estate was seized by Nazis and auctioned off. In 1949, the looted Cranach painting resurfaced in a Sotheby's sale in London, where it had been consigned by dealer Hans W. Lange, whose auction house was known for forced sales of Jewish-owned property. Thaw bought it around 1968 after the Cranach had passed through the hands of New York dealers Hugo Perls and the Knoedler gallery.
