= Martin Dannenberg =

American insurance executive (1915-2010)

Martin Ernest Dannenberg
- Born: November 5, 1915; Baltimore, United States
- Died: August 18, 2010 (aged 94)

Martin Ernest Dannenberg (November 5, 1915 – August 18, 2010) was an American insurance executive who served as chairman of the Sun Life Insurance Company for five decades. While serving as a counterintelligence officer in the United States Army during World War II with the U.S. Third Army, Dannenberg discovered an original copy of the Nuremberg Laws signed by Adolf Hitler. The document was in the personal possession of General George S. Patton and held by The Huntington Library until it was turned over to the United States National Archives days after Dannenberg's death.

== Biography ==
Dannenberg was born on November 5, 1915, in Baltimore, where his family had been part of the founding of Har Sinai Congregation in 1842. After completing high school, he worked for the Sun Life Insurance Company as a clerk in the records department and earned his bachelor's degree from Baltimore City College. He later attended Johns Hopkins University and the University of Baltimore School of Law at night, but dropped out after his boss showed him former lawyers who were forced to sell fruit on the street during the Great Depression. After completing his military service, Dannenberg returned to work for Sun Life, becoming the company chairman until his retirement in 1987. During his tenure, he undertook a number of acquisitions that turned the company into a major national insurance industry competitor. He was active with the Boy Scouts of America and had been honored as the oldest living Eagle Scout in Maryland.

A resident of Guilford, Baltimore, he was active in community organizations and served as president of Har Sinai Congregation. Dannenberg died at age 94 on August 18, 2010, of complications from a fall. He was survived by his second wife, as well as a daughter, two sons, a stepdaughter, eight grandchildren and three great-grandchildren.

== Nuremberg Laws document ==
Dannenberg attempted to enlist in the United States Army after World War II broke out, hoping to do counterintelligence duty, but was told he would be contacted after he was drafted. In April 1945, he visited the Dachau concentration camp, where he recounted that he had seen bodies stacked liked cordwood. He was approached in a beer hall by Hans Ruch, an employee of the finance ministry who was on the run from the Gestapo after telling his bosses that he believed that Germany had lost the war. Ruch told him that "I know the whereabouts of a document I think you Americans would like to have" and Dannenberg followed the lead to a bank vault in the Bavarian town of Eichstätt. On April 28, together with interpreter Frank Perls, Dannenberg found a manila folder sealed with red wax embossed with swastikas. Inside was an original four-page copy of the Nuremberg Laws signed by Adolf Hitler in September 1935, which stripped German Jews of their citizenship and prohibited Jews from marrying "Aryans". He said that he and Perls immediately realized the significance of what they had found and were moved by the fact that it had been uncovered by two Jewish soldiers.

Dannenberg had thought of retaining the document as a keepsake, and passed it on to Third Army headquarters where it came into the possession of General George S. Patton. Ignoring orders from General Dwight D. Eisenhower to turn all such material over to prosecutors preparing for the Nuremberg Trials of Nazi war criminals, Patton kept the document for himself. After returning to the United States, Patton gave the document to The Huntington Library, which had been established by Henry E. Huntington, a friend of his father's who had helped Patton get admitted into West Point. The document remained there for decades in its most secure bombproof vault, out of public view. Its existence first came to public attention when it was placed on loan to the Skirball Cultural Center in Los Angeles starting in 1999, where it was viewed by millions of visitors before it was removed from display in 2009 due to concerns about continued exposure to light. On August 25, 2010, one week after Dannenberg's death, The Huntington Library donated the document to the United States National Archives, which plans to put it on display in Washington, D.C. in advance of the 75th anniversary of the enactment of the Nuremberg Laws.
