= Judisk Krönika =

- Editor in chief: Anneli Rådestad
- Frequency: Bimonthly
- Circulation: 6,500 (in 2000)
- Founder: Daniel Brick
- Founded: 1932
- Country: Sweden
- Based in: Stockholm
- Language: Swedish
- Website: www.judiskkronika.se
- ISSN: 0345-5580

Judisk Krönika ("Jewish Chronicle") is a Jewish magazine based in Stockholm, Sweden. Published on a bimonthly basis with six issues a year, the magazine's circulation was around 6,500 copies in 2000. The editor in chief since 2015 is Anneli Rådestad.

== History and profile ==
The journal was founded in 1932 by Daniel Brick and Simon Brick. Judisk Tidskrift and the journal had high readership levels among the Jewish origin Swedes during the 1940s and 1950s. Judisk Krönika published continuously about anti-Jewish developments from early 1933 and throughout the entire period of Nazi terror.

In 1979, the Jewish assemblies and Jewish organizations in Sweden took over responsibility for the magazine, which then became the main information channel of Judaism in Sweden. In 1988, Stiftelsen Judisk Krönika ("Judisk Krönika Foundation") was founded, which functions as the publisher.
