= Elly Jannes =

Swedish writer & journalist (1907–2006)

- Born: 15 November 1907; Örebro, Sweden
- Died: 11 February 2006 (aged 98)
- Spouse: Svante Hojeberg (died 1966)
- Children: Elle-Kari
- Parent(s): Janne Petterson; Anna Landstrom

Elly Jannes (November 15, 1907 – February 11, 2006) was a Swedish writer and journalist.

== Biography ==
Jannes was born in Örebro in November 1907. She was the daughter of Janne Petterson and his wife Anna Landström. She grew up in Brevens bruk in Kilsmo. Her upbringing at the mill affected her life and writing. Her perspective was always that of the working girl, aware of her origins and her upbringing, in the poor Sweden of the early 20th century.

Elly Jannes was the youngest of five siblings. Her older sisters supported her to learn to read. Since Jannes was a small child, she dreamed of becoming a journalist and writer. She later won a short story contest in Idun and was employed by the magazine. In 1936 she left Idun, was hired as a reporter for the magazine Vi and worked for it until she retired.

Elly Jannes was married to a doctor, Svante Höjeberg (born in 1917, died in 1966), and had a daughter, Elle-Kari Höjeberg, born in 1953, who was working as a programme manager at Sweden Radio P2 (2006). Elle-Kari was named after the protagonist of the photographic novel Elle Kari. The photographic novel was written by Jannes and included photographs by Anna Riwkin-Brick. It was the first book in the series Children's Everywhere and has been translated into eighteen different languages. The first issue in Germany alone sold over 25,000 copies. Years later, the Israeli director Dvorit Shargal made a documentary (Where Is Elle Kari and What Happened to Noriko-san?) where she tried to find Elle Kari, the protagonist from the book. She talked with Jannes's daughter about the making of the book.

== Bibliography ==
- Renarna visar vägen 1942 (photographs by Anna Riwkin-Brick)
- Detta är mitt enda liv 1944
- Människor därute 1946
- Österland 1949
- Nomads of the North (Vandrande by) 1950 (photographs by Riwkin-Brick)
- Elle Kari 1951 (photographs by Riwkin-Brick)
- Solnedgångens land 1953
- Öknen skall glädjas 1954
- Ett år med Kari 1955
- På väg till Ujamaa, (photographs by Elle-Kari Höjeberg), Rabén & Sjögren, Stockholm 1972, ISBN 91-29-48052-3
- Människor i Tanzania 1974
- Möten i Moçambique 1976

== Awards ==
- Svenska Dagbladet Literature Prize 1944
