= Eugénie Söderberg =

Swedish-American writer and journalist

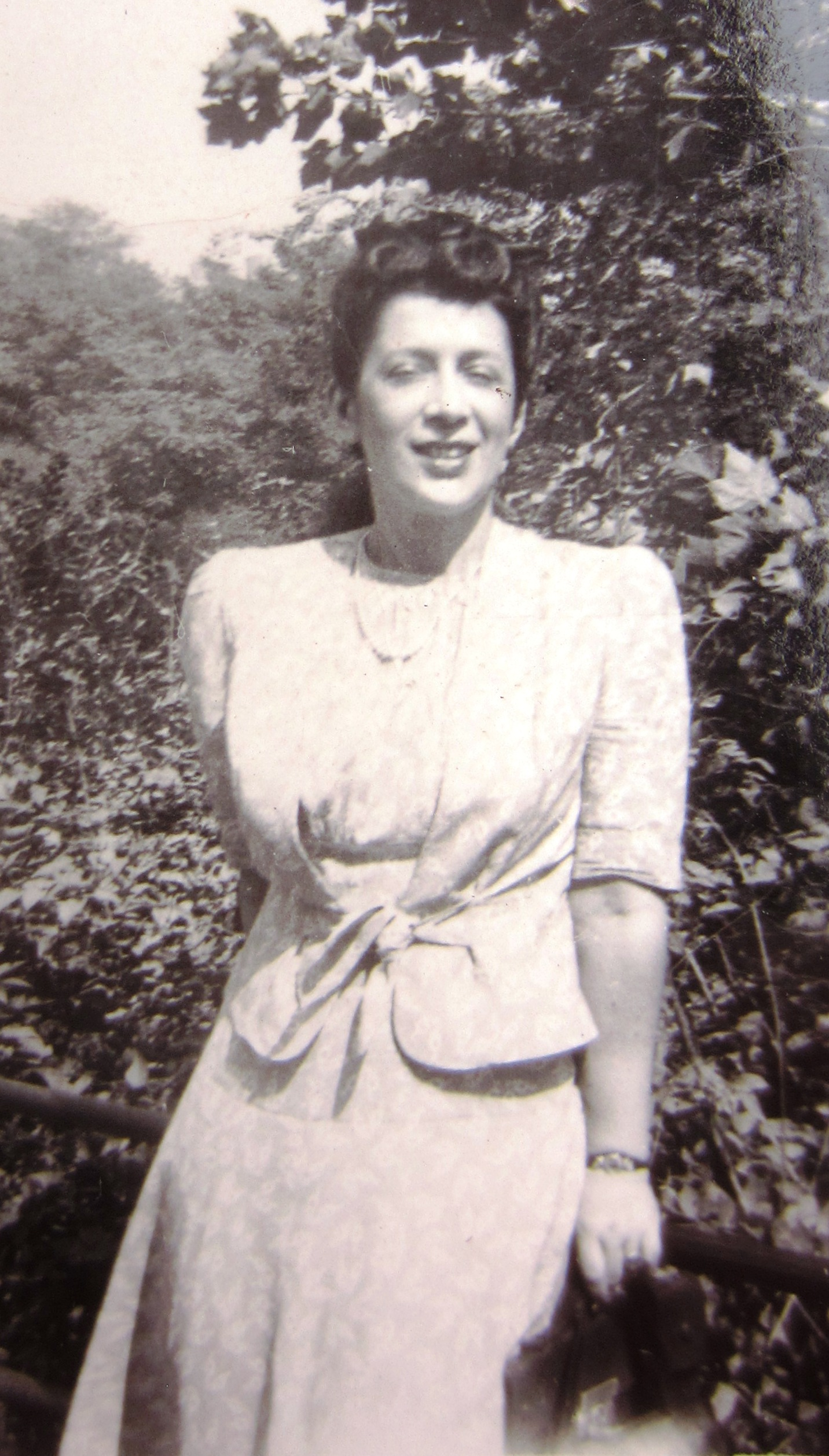
- Eugénie Söderberg-Perls in Central Park, New York after 1940. Photo: Göteborgs Universitetsbibliotek.

Eugenie Söderberg (1903–1973) was a Swedish-American writer and journalist born in Heidelberg, Germany noted for her profound concern with women's issues which she addressed in her novels and short stories.

== Early years ==
In 1912, her father, Alexander Riwkin, a Russian-Jewish immigrant who had studied philosophy established himself in Stockholm, Sweden, as an industrialist following a short return to the family's home town, Gomel in Russia. The Riwkin home flourished as a center for culture, attracting both established and upcoming literary figures from Scandinavia and abroad. Eugenie, the eldest daughter was encouraged by her philosopher father who was also a lecturer and writer of short stories in Russian and Yiddish.

Eugenie's younger brother Joseph Riwkin also followed a similar path, acting for a while as a stimulating nucleus within a group of the most aspiring young writers of Sweden. These included Gunnar Ekelöf, Harry Martinson, Karin Boye, Ebbe Linde, who with many others participated as writers and editors in the avant-garde Swedish magazine, Spektrum.

== Career ==
Eugenie was soon working as a creative writer and earning her living as an editor, journalist and newspaper reporter. She attained immediate success in 1930 with her first novel Studentfabriken (The Student Factory). The work was translated into fourteen languages and also produced as a film.

In 1928 she married the young writer Mikael Söderberg and son of Hjalmar Söderberg. After only a couple of years of marriage her husband died in 1931. She continued to maintain a close relationship with her in-laws, in particular her father-in-law. However it was her sister Anna Riwkin, Sweden's foremost photographer, who was to be her closest friend throughout her lifetime, although she remained close to her brother Joseph and her sister-in-law, Ester Riwkin, both also writers.

== Later life ==
In 1940 Eugenie Söderberg came to the United States as a reporter for Scandinavian newspapers and in 1942 she married the well-known art dealer and Plato scholar Hugo Perls. She eventually became an American citizen and continued to write both journalistically and creatively, covering American theater, music and art. One of her later books, Min Son är Min (My Son is Mine), appeared in 1965 and was well received.

The writer died in January 1973, at the age of sixty-nine.

== Publications (selection) ==
- 1933 – Kulturen i Sovjet (as Eugénie Riwkin–Söderberg, Bonnier)
- 1936 – Studentfabriken: roman (Bonnier)
- 1947 – Med bästa avsikt: roman (Medén)
- 1961 – Mokihana bor på Hawaii (Rabén & Sjögren)
  - English translation: Mokihana lives in Hawaii (1961)
- 1962 – Hawaii (with Anna Riwkin-Brick)
- 1965 – Min son är min (Rabén & Sjögren)
- 1970 – "Kollektivet kring Spektrum". In the newspaper Bonniers litterära magasin, 1970: nr 8
