= Cordelia Edvardson =

Journalist, author, and Holocaust survivor (1929–2012)

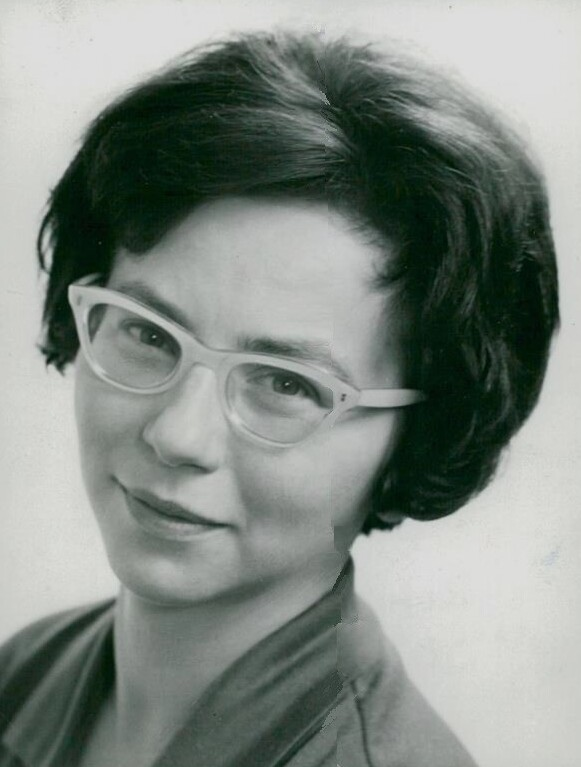
- Photo of journalist and Holocaust survivor Cordelia Edvardson
- Born: Cordelia Maria Langgässer; 1 January 1929; Munich, Bavaria, Germany
- Died: 29 October 2012 (aged 83); Stockholm, Sweden
- Occupations: Journalist, author
- Parent(s): Hermann Heller; Elisabeth Langgässer
- Relatives: Lukas Heller (half-brother); Bruno Heller (nephew); Zoë Heller (niece)

Cordelia Maria Edvardson (née Langgässer; 1 January 1929 – 29 October 2012) was a German-born Swedish journalist, author and Holocaust survivor. She was the Jerusalem correspondent for Svenska Dagbladet, a Swedish daily newspaper, from 1977 to 2006. Edvardson reported extensively on the Israeli–Palestinian conflict, remaining a columnist for Svenska Dagbladet after leaving her post in 2006.

== Background ==
Edvardson was born in Munich, Germany, in 1929. She was raised Catholic. However, since her father, Hermann Heller, was Jewish, Edvardson was arrested by the Nazis and deported to the Theresienstadt and Auschwitz concentration camps during the Holocaust. Her maternal grandfather had also been Jewish, and converted to Catholicism.

After immigrating to Sweden after World War II, Edvardson began her journalism career. In 1984, she published an autobiography (Bränt barn söker sig till elden (English: Burned Child Seeks the Fire)) documenting her life as a Holocaust survivor, which earned her the Geschwister-Scholl-Preis literary prize.

== Passing ==
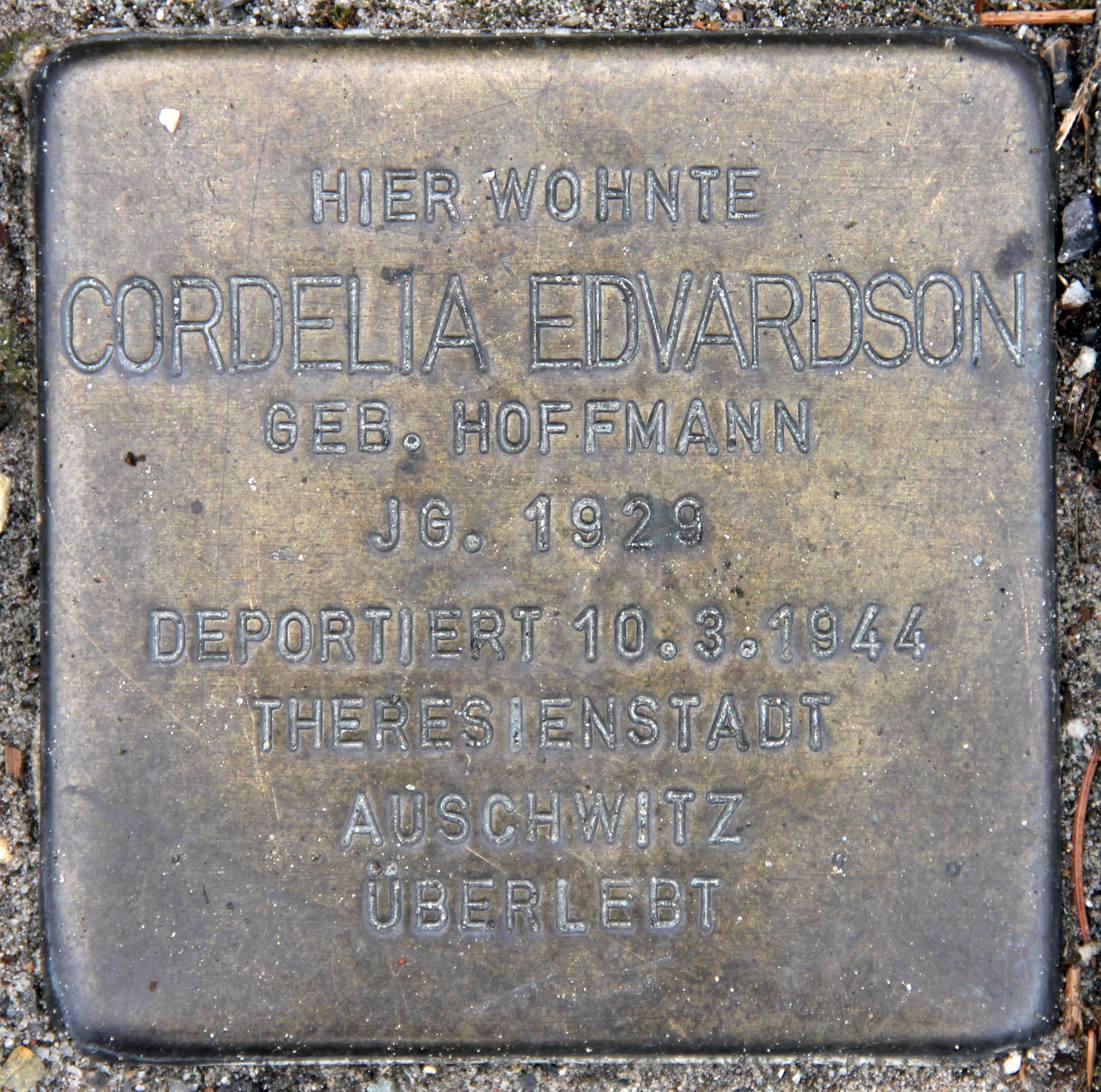
A plaque at Edvardson's childhood home in Berlin, marking her deportation to Auschwitz.

Cordelia Edvardson died from an illness in Stockholm on 29 October 2012, at the age of 83.
