= Anna Riwkin-Brick =

Russian-born Swedish photographer

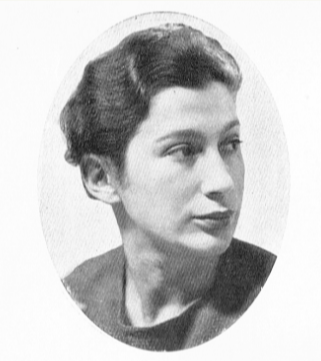
- Anna Riwkin-Brick, 1950
- Born: Anna Riwkin; 10 June 1908; Surazh, Chernigov Governorate, Russian Empire
- Died: 19 December 1970 (aged 62); Tel Aviv, Israel
- Other name: Anna Riwkin
- Citizenship: Swedish
- Occupation: Photographer
- Years active: 1927–1970
- Known for: Photography, children's books, photojournalism
- Notable work: Elle Kari, The Family of Man (exhibition)
- Spouse: Daniel Brick (m. 1929)
- Awards: Elsa Beskow Medal (1963)

Anna Riwkin-Brick born Anna Riwkin (Hebrew: חנה ריבקין-בריק, Surazh, Chernigov Governorate, Russia 23 June [O.S. 10 June] 1908 – Tel Aviv 19 December 1970) was a Russian-born Swedish photographer.

== Early life ==
Anna Riwkin was born in Surazh in the Russian Empire into a Jewish family and came to Sweden, at the age of 7, with her parents in 1914. Her father Scholom Sender (Alexander) Riwkin, born in Gomel in 1878, had studied philosophy in Heidelberg before becoming a paper manufacturer, and published philosophical pamphlets in his youth. Her mother was Frida Perlman (1881–1944). The family were part of the Ashkenazi Jewish community. Anna was affectionately nicknamed Anusjka and Channo within the family.

In 1915, the Riwkin family moved to Sweden, where Anna grew up with her siblings, including her sister Honjah (later the writer Eugénie Söderberg) and her brother Josef Riwkin. For a period, the children were tutored by the Russian revolutionary Nikolai Bukharin while living in Stockholm. From 1919 to 1922, Anna and her siblings lived with their mother in Swinemünde in northern Germany (now Świnoujście, Poland) before returning to Stockholm, where Anna attended the progressive Whitlockska samskolan and studied ballet for three years. She danced professionally for some time before an injured foot put an early stop to her career.

== Career ==
=== Photographer ===
She was employed as an assistant to the court photographer Moisé Benkow in 1927, and started her own portrait and dance photography studio in Stockholm in 1928. Around this time, she also worked as a theater and dance photographer, and her portraits began appearing in the radical cultural magazine Spektrum, founded by her brother Josef Riwkin. Her photography was closely linked with Stockholm's intellectual and artistic circles in the late 1920s and 1930s, where figures such as Karin Boye, Gunnar Ekelöf, and Erik Mesterton were prominent contributors.

She married Daniel Brick the editor of the Swedish-Jewish Zionist periodical Judisk Krönika, translator of Russian, Yiddish and Czech, in 1929, and marketed her work by displaying portraits of young writers and intellectuals from among her husband's acquaintances.

As a former dancer, she remained interested in dance as a subject of photography and illustrated a book on Swedish dance, Svensk Danskonst, published in 1932 and in the following year her photographs were exhibited in the international exhibition Dance and Movement in Paris.

In the summer of 1933, she visited Paris with her friend Thora Dardel and photographed leading figures in the surrealist movement including Jean Arp, André Breton, Salvador Dalí, Max Ernst, and Man Ray. A famous group photo of these artists was taken by Riwkin but later misattributed to Ernst.

She later illustrated a book on ballet in 1960, Balettskolan with texts by the choreographer Birgit Cullberg and the dance teacher Lilian Karina Vasarhelyi.

=== Photojournalism ===
From the 1930s, Riwkin added journalistic work to her repertoire, collaborating on several books with the journalist Elly Jannes and the writer Ivar Lo-Johansson. Her first one-person show was held in 1936 in Kungsgatan in 1936.

After the Second World War, she worked for the Swedish photojournalistic magazine Se, for which she went on numerous trips both within Sweden and to foreign countries, photographing mainly women subjects in Greece, Yugoslavia, USA, Japan, Korea, Israel and India. In 1948 she published a book on Palestine.

She returned to Israel in 1955, publishing another photo book with Daniel Brick, titled Israel, that portrayed the early years of the state through expressive, human-centered photography. She also collaborated with social reformer Elise Ottesen-Jensen on photographic documentation of women's issues in Sweden.

From her photojournalistic and travel photography came the work selected by Edward Steichen for his 1955 globally-touring The Family of Man exhibition. One, of a family in the snow in Lapland, is typical of work she was later to publish in children's books, while the other, used to illustrate the idea of protest in the exhibition, is cropped image of a woman animatedly relating a story to neighbours from the couple's book Israel.

=== Children's picture books with photography ===
In 1950, with the aim of promoting tolerance by introducing children from different countries to each other's lives, and international understanding through children's literature that would also be read by adults, Riwkin-Brick was commissioned by the UNESCO to make a photo book about the Sámi people. She persuaded Elly Jannes, a journalist for the journal Vi, to write the text for Vandrande by ('Wandering Village', also released as 'Nomads of the North'), published in 1950. Anna Riwkin-Brick took many photos of a Sámi family's little girl Elle Kari that were not included in the Vandrande by edition, and Elly Jannes suggested they make another photo book about Elle Kari and to aim it at a child audience which was published in 1951.

It was the first Swedish picture book with photos of everyday life of a child in a continuous story, and the first of many such books that the photographer was to make. It was a success. Translated into eighteen languages in editions with high print runs; 25,000 copies were printed for the first edition released in Germany, the United Kingdom, and the United States. Riwkin-Brick issued a series of 19 children's books (Children's Everywhere), each focusing on the everyday life of a child in a particular place or country. For nine of these books, Astrid Lindgren wrote the text and authors for others include Hebrew author Lea Goldberg who contributed the text for Eli bar i Israel (Eli Lives in Israel, 1964); Cordelia Edvardson, an immigrant from Germany to Sweden and author of the autobiographical novel Briinnt barn (Burnt Child, 1985), wrote the text for Mirjam bar i Kibbutz (Mirjam Lives in a Kibbutz, 1969); Riwkin-Brick's sister Eugenie Soderberg penned the text of Makihana (1961); and Vera Forsberg contributed the texts for Gennet bar i Etiopien (Gennet Lives in Ethiopia, 1967) and Salima bar i Kashmir (Salimar Lives in Kashmir, 1970). Sales of Riwkin's children's books totalled 900,000 copies. In 2014 the Israeli director Dvorit Shargal searched for the children in the books and made a film (Where Is Elle Kari and What Happened to Noriko-san?) about what had been happening to the children after these books were published. Noiriko and Eva from the books were able to meet up again in Tokyo.

=== Photo agency ===
In 1960 Riwkin established the photo agency Full Hand with Gösta Glass, Gustav Hansson, Bo Dahlin and Rolf Blomberg.

Her book Medmänniskor ('Fellow Beings'), in which she rephotographed her friends of the 1920s; dancers, artists, gypsies and the Sámi child Elle Kari (of her first children's book), was published in 1962.

== Award and legacy ==
Anna Riwkin-Brick received the Elsa Beskow Medal in 1963, the first time it was awarded to a photographer instead of an illustrator.

Riwkin died in 1970 of cancer in Israel. On the instruction of her will, her photographs were donated to Moderna Museet's Fotografiska Museet in Stockholm.

== Exhibitions ==
- 1936 Anna Riwkin ateljé, Kungsgatan, Stockholm (solo)
- 1938 Forsners Utsällningshall, Stockholm (solo)
- 1953 Bankhallen, Stockholm (solo)
- 1954 Museum Tel-Aviv, Israel (solo)
- 1955 The Family of Man international travelling exhibition (group)
- 1957 Barnbilder vid KF's International Kongress (solo)
- 1968 Stockholms Stadsmuseum, Stockholm
- 1969 A Trip Around the World, Museum Tel-Aviv, Israel (solo)
- 1972 Galleri Heland, Stockholm (solo)

Posthumous exhibitions of photographs by Anna Riwkin-Brick were held at the Moderna museet, Stockholm:

- 10 December 1977 – 5 March 1978,
- 14 February – 23 May 2004

== Publications ==
- Riwkin-Brick, Anna; Brick, Daniel (1948), Palestine: photographs by Anna Riwkin-Brick, World Pub. Co
- Riwkin-Brick, Anna; Jannes, Elly (1950), Nomads of the north, Kooperativa förbundets bokförlag
- Riwkin-Brick, Anna; Arvidsson, Karl Axel (1953), Millesgården, Rabén & Sjögren, Veckotidingen Vi
- Milles garden, Raben & Sjogren, 1953
- Riwkin-Brick, Anna; Jannes, Elly (1956), Elle Kari, Methuen
- Goldberg, Leah; Riwkin-Brick, Anna, 1908–, (ill.) (1956), Malkat Sheva ha-ḳeṭanah: sipur me-ḥaye yeladim ʻolim, Sifre Tsabar
- Riwkin-Brick, Anna; Brick, Daniel (1958), Israel: the land of yesterday and tomorrow, W.H. Allen
- Lindgren, Astrid (1958), Noriko-San: girl of Japan, Methuen
- Riwkin-Brick, Anna; Lindgren, Astrid (1959), My Swedish cousins, Swedish Institute: Rabén & Sjörgen
- Lindgren, Astrid; Riwkin-Brick, Anna (1959), Sia lives on Kilimanjaro, Methuen & Co
- Arvidsson, Karl Axel; Riwkin-Brick, Anna; Dancy, Eric; Burke, P. E. (1960), Carl Milles and Millesagarden, Raben & Sjogren
- Riwkin-Brick, Anna (1960), Circus child: photographs by Anna Riwkin-Brick, story by Astrid Lindgren. Translated from the Swedish ed, Methuen
- Riwkin-Brick, Anna; Lindgren, Astrid (1961), Lilibet, circus child, Macmillan
- Riwkin-Brick, Anna (1961), Mokihana lives in Hawaii, Methuen
- Riwkin-Brick, Anna; Soderberg, Eugénie. Hawaii, a way of life (1962), Hawaii, a way of life, Macmillan Company
- Riwkin-Brick, Anna; Lindgren, Astrid (1963), Dirk lives in Holland, Methuen
- Riwkin-Brick, Anna; Lindgren, Astrid (1963), Marko lives in Yugoslavia, Methuen
- Riwkin-Brick, Anna; Lindgren, Astrid (1965), Randi lives in Norway, Macmillan
- Goldberg, Leah; Riwkin-Brick, Anna (illustrator) (1966), Harpatḳah ba-midbar, [Tel Aviv] Ha-Ḳibuts ha-meʼuḥad
- Riwkin-Brick, Anna; Forsberg, Vera (1968), Gennet lives in Ethiopia, Macmillan
- Riwkin-Brick, Anna; Lindgren, Astrid (1968), Matti bor i Finland. Foto: Anna Riwkin-Brick, Rabén & Sjögren
- Riwkin-Brick, Anna; Forsberg, Vera (1968), Gennet lives in Ethiopia, Wheaton, ISBN 978-0-08-008818-1
- Bushell, Gerard; Riwkin-Brick, Anna, 1908-, (illus.) (1969), Churches of the Holy Land, Cassell, ISBN 978-0-304-93370-9
- Riwkin-Brick, Anna; Goldberg, Lea (1964), Eli lives in Israel, Methuen
- Lindgren, Astrid; Lindgren, Astrid (1965), Gerda lives in Norway, Methuen
- Riwkin-Brick, Anna; Lindgren, Astrid (1967), Noy lives in Thailand, Methuen
- Edwardson, Cordelia; Riwkin-Brick, Anna (1970), Miriam lives in a kibbutz, Wheaton, ISBN 978-0-08-006572-4
- Riwkin-Brick, Anna; Forsberg, Vera (1970), Salima bor i Kashmir, Rabén & Sjögren
- Forsberg, Vera; Riwkin-Brick, Anna (1971), Salima lives in Kashmir, Methuen, ISBN 978-0-416-65340-3
- Wine, Maria; Riwkin-Brick, Anna, 1908-1970, (ill.) (1971), Djurkrets. Dikter av Maria Wine. Bilder av Anna Riukin, Rabén & Sjögren, ISBN 978-91-29-43174-2
- Moderna museet (Stockholm, Sweden); Wigh, Leif; Bergman, Ulla; Sidwall, Åke (1977), Fotografer--Curt Götlin, Anna Riwkin, Karl Sandels, Moderna museet/Fotografiska museet, ISBN 978-91-7100-133-7
- Riwkin-Brick, Anna; Lindgren, Astrid; Ó Súilleabháin, Eoghan (1979), Klaas as an Ísiltír, Oifig an tSoláthair

== Publications about Anna Riwkin-Brick ==
- Wigh, Leif; Moderna museet (Stockholm, Sweden) (2004), Anna Riwkin: portrait of a photographer, Moderna museet, ISBN 978-91-7100-699-8
- Catalogue of an exhibition at Fotografiska museet, 10 December 1977 – 5 March 1978. Moderna museet (Stockholm, Sweden); Wigh, Leif; Bergman, Ulla; Sidwall, Åke (1977), Fotografer--Curt Götlin, Anna Riwkin, Karl Sandels, Moderna museet/Fotografiska museet, ISBN 978-91-7100-133-7
- If she has a camera in her hand, she is not afraid (Tel Aviv, Israel) (2025), Dvorit Shargal.
