= Høst & Søn =

Høst & Søn, formerly Andr. Fred. Høst and Andr. Fred. Høst & Søn, was a publishing house and bookshop founded in 1836 in Copenhagen, Denmark. It was acquired by Munkegaard in 1975 and has been part of Gyldendal since 1998. As of 2003, Høst & Søn is no longer operated as an independent subsidiary but survives as a brand under Rosinante & Co. that specializes in children's books and youth literature.

== History ==
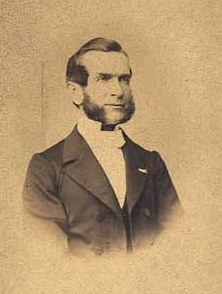
Andreas Frederik Høst in the 1860s

The company was established on 15 April 1836 when Andreas Frederik Høst (1811-1897) opened a combined book and art shop at Gothersgade 49 in Copenhagen. In 1842, Høst was appointed to university book shop and by then he had commenced his activities as a publisher. Among his early publications were books by Hans Christian Ørsted and Adam Oehlenschläger.

The company was renamed Andr. Høst & Søn when Høst's son Peter Chr. Muusfeldt Høst (1847-1900) became a partner on 1 January 1873. By then its activities also included import of books. Peter Christian Høst became the sole owner of the company on 1 July 1892. A department specializing in used books opened on 1 January 1883 under the name Skandinavisk Antikvariat. On 24 November that same year Høst's bookshop was appointed to court bookshop. In 1896 the company relocated to Bredgade 35.

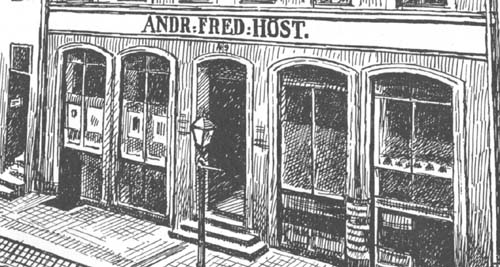
Høst's book shop in c. 1840

Peter Chr. Høst's widow Marie Claire Høst (1854-1932) took over the operation of the company after his death on 25 February 1900. On 1 July 1901 she was appointed to English court bookseller. Their son Andreas Frederik Høst (1885-1912) became a partner on 1 January 1911 but died just 28 years old on 4 May the following year.

On 1 January 1917, Marie Claire Høst sold the company to Johannes Lind (1890-1935). Marie Høst initially kept Skandinavisk Antikvariat tbut sold it to Sigurd Wandel in July 1924 and Høst & Søn then established a new bused bookshop. In 1934 the company acquired Koppels Forlag. Johannes Lind's widow Gerda Lind took over the company after his death on 23 February 1935. It is converted into an aktieselskab on 1 January 1936. Johannes and Gerda Lind's son Mogens C. Lind (1918-2000) was appointed to CEO in 1946.

The company changed its name to Høst & Søns Forlag after the bookshop closed on 31 December 1975. In 1986, it was sold to Munkegaard. Joachim Malling, who already heading Hans Reitzels Forlag, another Munkegaard subsidiary, then became the CEO of both companies. The company initially moved to Dronningens Tværgade and later to Nørre Søgade. Erik C. Lindgren took over the management of the company after Malling was promoted to CEO of the entire Munkegaard Group.

In 1998 Høst & Søns Forlag was acquired by Gyldendal along with the rest of Munkegaard Group. Høst & Søn was discontinued as an independent subsidiary in 2003.

== Today ==
Høst & Søn is no longer operated as an independent subsidiary but survives as a brand under Rosinante & Co. that specializes in children's books and youth literature.
