= Velvet Underground (blog) =

Israeli blog

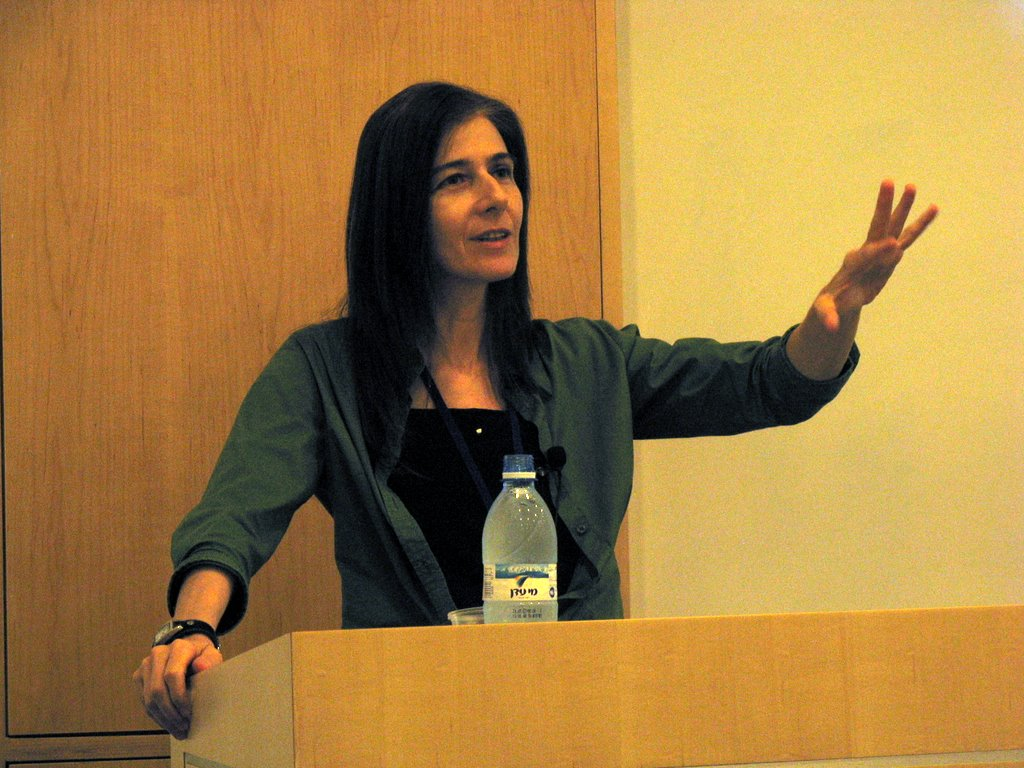
Dvorit Shargal by Anton Nossik

Velvet Underground (Hebrew: ולווט אנדרגראונד; Velvet Andergraund) is an Israeli blog.

Its creator was anonymous and followed meticulously all the recent events in all the newspapers and media arenas in Israel. As she referred to herself by the pseudonym "Velvet", she documented each and every development, and also some behind the scenes actions that took place—such as new personas that are being appointed for key media roles and big media scandals—sometimes exposing them herself.

In a post dated May 14, 2006, Velvet made local history by publishing for the first time a rough assessment of the wages paid for journalists, for article and magazine stories, in the leading media newspapers and portals in Israel, such as Walla!, Maariv, Yedioth Ahronoth and Globes.

On June 29, 2006, 04:31 Israel time, Velvet revealed her identity to be Dvorit Shargal (דבורית שרגל)—an Israeli journalist who writes film reviews on the weekly Rating magazine. As for her conclusions from Israeli press, after carefully observing it for six months, she writes: "What did I learn of Israeli journalism that I did not already know? Nothing new, actually. Mostly it was the fact that there are too many journalist that don't know their work: don't know how to interview, investigate, or write properly—not to mention to read and or to edit. I also learned that most of them are not even bothered by the responsibility that lies beneath their keyboards. Some of them even insist that they were correct, even after proven otherwise."

In November 2009 Dvorit attended the World Blogging Forum in Bucharest, Romania, where bloggers from all over the world talked about the freedom of speech and online journalism.
