= Rabén & Sjögren =

Swedish book publishing company

- Parent company: Norstedts förlag
- Founded: 1942; 84 years ago
- Country of origin: Sweden
- Headquarters location: Stockholm
- Publication types: Books
- Fiction genres: Children's and youth literature
- Official website: www.raben.se

Rabén & Sjögren is a book publishing company in Sweden. It was established in 1942 by Hans Rabén and Carl-Olof Sjögren. Since 1998 it has been part of Norstedts förlag.

The publishing focus is on children's and youth literature. Rabén & Sjögren was very successful, publishing the books of Astrid Lindgren. Other authors include Enid Blyton and Jostein Gaarder.

Rabén & Sjögren also published Svenskt författarlexikon ("Dictionary of Swedish Authors"), a bibliobiographical dictionary of Swedish-language authors in ten volumes between 1942 and 1981.
