= Astrid Lindgren bibliography =

The following is a list of books published by Astrid Lindgren, a Swedish author of children's fiction.

== Children and youth novels ==
=== Series ===
Title (series)	Title (individual novel)	Alternative titles	Original title	Original release	English release	Notes and references
Bill Bergson series (Mästerdetektiven Blomkvist)	Bill Bergson, Master Detective		Mästerdetektiven Blomkvist	1946	1952	
Bill Bergson series (Mästerdetektiven Blomkvist)	Bill Bergson Lives Dangerously		Mästerdetektiven Blomkvist lever farligt	1951	1954	
Bill Bergson series (Mästerdetektiven Blomkvist)	Bill Bergson and the White Rose Rescue		Kalle Blomkvist och Rasmus	1954	1965	
The Children on Troublemaker Street series	The Children on Troublemaker Street	Lotta, Lotta Says No!, Mischievous Martens	Barnen på Bråkmakargatan	1956	1964	
The Children on Troublemaker Street series	Lotta on Troublemaker Street	Lotta Leaves Home, Lotta Makes a Mess	Lotta på Bråkmakargatan	1961	1964	
Emil of Lönneberga series (Emil i Lönneberga)	Emil in the Soup Tureen	Emil and the Great Escape, That Boy Emil!	Emil i Lönneberga	1963	1970	
Emil of Lönneberga series (Emil i Lönneberga)	Emil's Pranks	Emil and the Sneaky Rat, Emil Gets into Mischief	Nya hyss av Emil i Lönneberga	1966	1971	
Emil of Lönneberga series (Emil i Lönneberga)	Emil and Piggy Beast	Emil and His Clever Pig	Än lever Emil i Lönneberga	1970	1973	
Karlsson-on-the-Roof series (Karlsson på taket)	Karlsson-on-the-Roof	Karlson on the Roof, Eric and Karlsson-on-the-Roof	Lillebror och Karlsson på taket	1955	1958	
Karlsson-on-the-Roof series (Karlsson på taket)	Karlson Flies Again	Karlsson-on-the-Roof is Sneaking Around Again	Karlsson på taket flyger igen	1962	1977	
Karlsson-on-the-Roof series (Karlsson på taket)	The World’s Best Karlson		Karlsson på taket smyger igen	1968	1980	
Kati series	Kati in America		Kati i Amerika	1951	1964	
Kati series	Kati in Italy		Kati på Kaptensgatan	1952	1961	
Kati series	Kati in Paris		Kati i Paris	1953	1966	
Madicken series	Mardie	Mischievous Meg	Madicken	1960	1962	
Madicken series	Mardie to the Rescue		Madicken och Junibackens Pims	1976	1981	
Madicken series	The Runaway Sleigh Ride		Titta, Madicken, det snöar!	1983	1984	
Pippi Longstocking series (Pippi Långstrump)	Pippi Longstocking		Pippi Långstrump	1945	1950	
Pippi Longstocking series (Pippi Långstrump)	Pippi Goes On Board	Pippi Goes Aboard	Pippi Långstrump går ombord	1946	1957	
Pippi Longstocking series (Pippi Långstrump)	Pippi in the South Seas		Pippi Långstrump i Söderhavet	1948	1959	
The Six Bullerby Children / The Children of Noisy Village series (Barnen i Bullerbyn)	The Children of Noisy Village	Cherry Time at Bullerby	Alla vi barn i Bullerbyn	1947	1962	
The Six Bullerby Children / The Children of Noisy Village series (Barnen i Bullerbyn)	Happy Times in Noisy Village		Bara roligt i Bullerbyn	1952	1963	

=== Individual novels ===
Title	Alternative titles	Original title	Original release	English release	Notes and references
The Brothers Lionheart		Bröderna Lejonhjärta	1973	1975	
Mio, My Son	Mio, My Mio	Mio, min Mio	1954	1956	
Ronja, the Robber's Daughter		Ronja rövardotter	1981	1983	
Seacrow Island		Vi på Saltkråkan	1964	1968	
Rasmus and the Vagabond	Rasmus and the Tramp	Rasmus på luffen	1956	1960	

== Picture books ==
=== Series ===
Title (series)	Title (individual novel)	Alternative titles	Original title	Original release	English release	Notes and references
Children's Everywhere series	Noriko-San: Girl of Japan	Eva Visits Noriko-San	Eva möter Noriko-san	1956	1958	
Children's Everywhere series	Sia Lives on Kilimanjaro		Sia bor på Kilimandjaro	1958	1959	
Children's Everywhere series	My Swedish Cousins		Mina svenska kusiner	1959	1959	
Children's Everywhere series	Lilibet, Circus Child		Lilibet, cirkusbarn	1960	1961	
Children's Everywhere series	Marko Lives in Yugoslavia		Marko bor i Jugoslavien	1962	1963	
Children's Everywhere series	Dirk Lives in Holland		Jackie bor i Holland	1963	1964	
Children's Everywhere series	Randi Lives in Norway	Gerda Lives in Norway	Randi bor i Norge	1965	1965	
Children's Everywhere series	Noy Lives in Thailand		Noy bor i Thailand	1966	1967	
Children's Everywhere series	Matti Lives in Finland		Matti bor i Finland	1968	1968	
The Children on Troublemaker Street series	Lotta's Bike	Of Course Polly Can Ride a Bike	Visst kan Lotta cykla	1971	1972	
The Children on Troublemaker Street series	Lotta's Christmas Surprise	Of Course Polly Can Do Almost Anything	Visst kan Lotta nästan allting	1965	1978	
The Children on Troublemaker Street series	Lotta's Easter Surprise		Visst är Lotta en glad unge	1990	1991	
Emil of Lönneberga series (Emil i Lönneberga)	Emil's Little Sister		När lilla Ida skulle göra hyss	1984	1985	
Emil of Lönneberga series (Emil i Lönneberga)	Emil's Sticky Problem		Emils hyss nr 325	1970	1986	
Peter & Lena series	I Want a Brother or Sister	That's My Baby	Jag vill också ha ett syskon	1971	1979	
Peter & Lena series	I Want to Go to School Too		Jag vill också gå i skolan	1971	1980	
Pippi Longstocking series (Pippi Långstrump)	Pippi on the Run		På rymmen med Pippi Långstrump	1971	1976	
Pippi Longstocking series (Pippi Långstrump)	Pippi's After-Christmas Party		Pippi Långstrump har julgransplundring	1950	1995	
Pippi Longstocking series (Pippi Långstrump)	Pippi Longstocking in the Park		Pippi Långstrump i Humlegården	1945	2001	
Pippi Longstocking series (Pippi Långstrump)	Pippi Moves In!		Pippi flyttar in	1969	2012	
The Six Bullerby Children / The Children of Noisy Village series (Barnen i Bullerbyn)	Christmas in Noisy Village		Jul i Bullerbyn	1963	1964	
The Six Bullerby Children / The Children of Noisy Village series (Barnen i Bullerbyn)	Springtime in Noisy Village		Vår i Bullerbyn	1965	1966	
The Six Bullerby Children / The Children of Noisy Village series (Barnen i Bullerbyn)	Children's Day in Bullerbu	A Day at Bullerby	Barnens dag i Bullerbyn	1961	1967	
The Tomten series	The Tomten		Tomten är vaken	1960	1961	
The Tomten series	The Tomten and the Fox		Räven och Tomten	1965	1965	

==== Individual books ====
Title	Alternative titles	Original title	Original release	English release	Notes and references
Brenda Brave Helps Grandmother		Kajsa Kavat hjälper mormor	1958	1961	
A Calf for Christmas		När Bäckhultarn for till stan	1989	1992	
Christmas in the Stable		Jul i stallet	1961	1962	
The Day Adam Got Mad	Goran's Great Escape	När Adam Engelbrekt blev tvärarg	1991	1993	
The Dragon with Red Eyes		Draken med de röda ögonen	1985	1986	
The Ghost of Skinny Jack		Skinn Skerping – Hemskast av alla spöken i Småland	1986	1988	
I Don't Want to Go to Bed		Jag vill inte gå och lägga mig!	1947	1988	
In the Land of Twilight		I Skymningslandet	1949	2012	
Mirabelle		Mirabell	2002	2003	
Most Beloved Sister	My Very Own Sister	Allrakäraste syster	1973	1974	
My Nightingale Is Singing		Spelar min lind, sjunger min näktergal	1959	1985	
Now That Night Is Near		Alla ska sova	2019	2020	
The Red Bird		Sunnanäng	1959	2005	
Scrap and the Pirates	Skrallan and the Pirates	Skrållan och Sjörövarna	1967	1968	
Simon Small Moves In		Nils Karlsson-Pyssling flyttar in	1956	1965	
The Story Journey From Junedale to Nangilima		Sagoresan från Junibacken till Nangilima	2006	2010	

== Other works ==
Title	Alternative titles	Original title	Original release	English release	Notes and references
25 automobile tours in Sweden		25 bilturer i Sverige	1939	1939	Published by Motormännens riksförbund (The Swedish Automobile Association) and Svenska turisttrafikförbundet (Swedish Tourist Traffic Association), Astrid Lindgren was not credited as the author.
Pomperipossa in Monismania	Pomperipossa in Monimania	Pomperipossa i Monismanien	1976	2002	Published in Swedish Book Review 2002:1, P. 22-26.
If I were God		Vore jag Gud or Om jag vore gud	1975	2018	Published in Never Violence!
Why do we write children's books?		Varför skriver man barnböcker?	1983	2017	Essay, first published in the final edition of Svensk Litteraturtidskrift (1983), the English essay was published in Children's Literature, volume 45, 2017, P. 188-195, Johns Hopkins University Press and was translated by Elizabeth Sofia Powell.
Pippi Can Lift a Horse: The Importance of Children's Books			1982	1983	Lecture, delivered by Astrid Lindgren at the Library of Congress on 15 November 1982, during the National Children's Book Week, later published as an English essay in The Quarterly Journal of the Library of Congress (1983), Volume 40, No. 3, P. 188-201.

== Not translated into English ==
Title	Original release	Notes and references
Britt-Mari lättar sitt hjärta	1944	
Kerstin och jag	1945	
Nils Karlsson-Pyssling	1949	Only the stories Simon Small Moves In, Mirabelle, Most Beloved Sister and In the Land of Twilight have been translated into English. The rest of the stories (Lustig-Gök, En natt i maj, Ingen rövare finns i skogen, Prinsessan som inte ville leka and Peter och Petra) not.
Sex Pjäser for barn och ungdom	1950	Contains the theatre plays: Pippi Långstrumps liv och leverne, Mästerdetektiven Blomkvist, Huvudsaken är att man är frisk, En fästmö till låns, Jag vill inte vara präktig, and Snövit.
Kajsa Kavat	1950	Only the stories Brenda Brave Helps Grandmother and The Day Adam Got Mad have been translated into English. The rest of the stories (Gull-Pian, Lite om Sammelagust, Nånting levande åt Lame-Kal, Under körsbärsträdet, Hoppa högst, Stora syster och lille bror, Pelle flyttar till Komfusenbo, Märit and Godnatt, herr luffare!) not.
Sunnanäng	1959	Only the stories The Red Bird and My Nightingale Is Singing have been translated into English. The rest of the stories (Tu tu tu! and Junker Nils av Eka) not.
Rasmus, Pontus och Toker	1957	
Pjäser för barn och ungdom - andra samlingen	1968	Contains the theatre plays: Ingen rövare finns i skogen; Jul hos Pippi Långstrump; Serverat, ers majestät; Rasmus, Pontus och Toker; Rasmus på luffen; Kalle Blomkvist, Nisse Nöjd och Vicke på vind.
Mitt Småland	1987	
En jul i Småland för länge sen	1992	It was first published in the novel En jul när jag var liten and later released as picture book.
Mitt barndomshem Näs: Astrid Lindgren berättar	2007	
Dina brev lägger jag under madrassen: en brevväxling 1971-2002	2012	
Jultomtens underbara bildradio och andra berättelser, 1933-1947	2013	Contains the stories: Jultomtens underbara bildradio, Johans äventyr på julafton, Filiokus, Pumpernickel och hans bröder, Den stora råttbalen, Julafton i Lilltorpet, Olle och Svipp, Mors-Dagsgåvan, Också en morsdagsgåva, Vännevän och harungen, Jorma och Lisbet, Sakletare, Måns börjar skolan, Två små bröder, and De första försöken: efterord.
Före grupp 8 – mycket före. Kåserier och noveller för vuxna	2014	Contains the stories: Maja får en fästman, Anders, Filiokus, Fyra kåserier av "Bibban", Om Epiktetos och vårhatten, Om platser, Om övertid, Om Bertil och fosterlandet, "Goddag tant Fia ...", Kampen om Fredrik, Dialog på Bröllopsdagen, Mitt fiasko som fru, Brevet. Novell, Fröken Palmkvist får semester, Johansson blir vetlös, Mammas lilla Nickon, Fröken Nettel vill inte skriva böcker, and Möte med fru Blomkvist.
Jag har också levat!	2016	

=== Plays ===
Title	Notes and references
Kalle Blomkvist, Nisse Nöjd och Vicke på Vind	Published in the book Pjäser för barn och ungdom. andra samlingen (1968).
Jul hos Pippi Långstrump	Published in the book Pjäser för barn och ungdom. andra samlingen (1968).
Serverat, Ers Majestät!	Published in the book Pjäser för barn och ungdom. andra samlingen (1968).
En fästmö till låns	Published in the book Sex pjäser för barn och ungdom (1950).
Huvudsaken är att man är frisk	Published in the book Sex pjäser för barn och ungdom (1950).
Jag vill inte vara präktig	Published in the book Sex pjäser för barn och ungdom (1950).
Snövit	Published in the book Sex pjäser för barn och ungdom (1950).
Pippi Långstrumps liv och leverne	Published in the book Sex pjäser för barn och ungdom (1950).
Mästerdetektiven Kalle Blomkvist: För kasperteater två korta akter	Published in the book Serverat, Ers Majestät! (1955).

== Biographies ==
=== Autobiographical books ===
Title	Original title	Original release	English release	Notes and references
Samuel August from Sevedstorp and Hanna i Hult, also A Love story	Samuel August från Sevedstorp och Hanna i Hult	1975	2007	
How Astrid Lindgren achieved enactment of the 1988 law protecting farm animals in Sweden	Min ko vill ha roligt (only parts of the book have been translated into English)		1989, Animal Welfare Institute	
Never Violence	Aldrig våld	2018	2018	
War Diaries, 1939–1945	Krigsdagböcker 1939-1946	2015	2017	

=== Other biographies ===
Title	Author	Original title	Original release	English release	Notes and references
Astrid from Vimmerby	Lena Törnqvist	Astrid från Vimmerby	1998	1999	
Astrid Lindgren – A Critical Study	Vivi Edström	Astrid Lindgren: Vildtoring och lägereld	1992	2000	
Astrid Lindgren, Storyteller to the World	Johanna Hurwitz	Astrid Lindgren, Storyteller to the World	1989	1989	
Astrid Lindgren: The Woman Behind Pippi Longstocking	Jens Andersen	Denne Dag, Et Liv - En Astrid Lindgren-biografi	2014	2018	
Astrid Lindgren (World Authors Series)	Eva-Maria Metcalf	Astrid Lindgren	1995	1995	
From Astrid to Lindgren	Vladimir Oravsky, Kurt Peter Larsen	Från Astrid till Lindgren	2007	2018	
The whole world's Astrid Lindgren: an exhibition at Astrid Lindgren's Näs	Kjell Åke Hansson	Hela världens Astrid Lindgren	2007	2007	
Astrid Lindgren - a life	Cilla Dalén	Astrid Lindgren - ett liv	2017	2018	
Beyond Pippi Longstocking: Intermedial and International Approaches to Astrid Lindgren's Work	Bettina Kümmerling-Meibauer, Astrid Surmatz	-	2011	2011	

== Literature ==
- Lars Bergtsson (2014): Bildbibliografi över Astrid Lindgrens skrifter 1921-2010. Sweden. Salikon förlag.

== See also ==
- Astrid Lindgren's plays
- List of adaptations of works by Astrid Lindgren
