= List of adaptations of works by Astrid Lindgren =

This is a list of media based on work by Astrid Lindgren.

== Live-action film ==
=== Films based on Lindgren's works ===
Year	English title	Original title	Based on / related literature	Director	Country	References
1947	Bill Bergson, Master Detective	Mästerdetektiven Blomkvist	Bill Bergson, Master Detective	Rolf Husberg	Sweden	
1949	Pippi Longstocking	Pippi Långstrump	Pippi Longstocking	Per Gunvall	Sweden	
1953	Bill Bergson and the White Rose Rescue	Mästerdetektiven och Rasmus	Bill Bergson and the White Rose Rescue	Rolf Husberg	Sweden	
1955	–	Luffaren och Rasmus	Rasmus and the Vagabond	Rolf Husberg	Sweden	
1956	–	Rasmus, Pontus och Toker	Rasmus, Pontus och Toker (radioplay & novel)	Stig Olin	Sweden	
1957	Bill Bergson Lives Dangerously	Mästerdetektiven Blomkvist lever farligt	Bill Bergson Lives Dangerously	Olle Hellbom	Sweden	
1960	The Children of Bullerbyn Village	Alla vi barn i Bullerbyn	The Six Bullerby Children	Olle Hellbom	Sweden	
1961	Pippi Longstocking (Shirley Temple's Storybook)	Pippi Longstocking (Shirley Temple's Storybook)	Pippi Longstocking	Frank Bunetta	USA	
1964	–	Tjorven, Båtsman och Moses	Seacrow Island	Olle Hellbom	Sweden	
1965	–	Tjorven och Skrållan	Scrap and the Pirates	Olle Hellbom	Sweden	
1966	–	Tjorven och Mysak	Scrap and the Pirates	Olle Hellbom	Sweden	
1966	–	Mästerdetektiven Blomkvist på nya äventyr	Kalle Blomkvist, Nisse Nöjd och Vicke på Vind (play)	Etienne Glaser	Sweden	
1967	–	Skrållan, Ruskprick och Knorrhane	–	Olle Hellbom	Sweden	
1969	Pippi Longstocking	Pippi Långstrump	Pippi Longstocking	Olle Hellbom	Sweden, Germany	
1969	Pippi Goes on Board	Här kommer Pippi Långstrump	Pippi Longstocking	Olle Hellbom	Sweden, Germany	
1970	Pippi in the South Seas	Pippi Långstrump på de sju haven	Pippi Longstocking	Olle Hellbom	Sweden, Germany	
1970	Pippi on the Run	På rymmen med Pippi Långstrump	Pippi Longstocking	Olle Hellbom	Sweden, Germany	
1971	–	Podezřelé prázdniny	Bill Bergson, Master Detective	Ludvík Ráža	Czechoslovakia	
1971	–	Emil i Lönneberga	Emil i Lönneberga	Olle Hellbom	Sweden, Germany	
1971	–	Erazem in Potepuh	Rasmus and the Vagabond	Staš Potočnik	Slovenia	
1971	–	Malysh i Karlson, kotoryy zhivyot na kryshe	Karlsson-on-the-Roof	Margarita Mikaelyan, Valentin Pluchek	Soviet Union	
1972	–	Nya hyss av Emil i Lönneberga	Emil i Lönneberga	Olle Hellbom	Sweden, Germany	
1973	Emil and the Piglet	Emil och griseknoen	Emil i Lönneberga	Olle Hellbom	Sweden, Germany	
1974	–	Världens bästa Karlsson	Karlsson-on-the-Roof	Olle Hellbom	Sweden	
1976	–	Priklyucheniya Kalle-syschika	Bill Bergson, Master Detective	Arūnas Žebriūnas	Lithuania	
1977	The Brothers Lionheart	Bröderna Lejonhjärta	The Brothers Lionheart	Olle Hellbom	Sweden	
1978	–	Rasmus-brodyaga	Rasmus and the Vagabond	Mariya Muat	Soviet Union	
1979	–	Du är inte klok, Madicken	Madicken	Göran Graffman	Sweden	
1980	–	Madicken på Junibacken	Madicken	Göran Graffman	Sweden	
1981	–	Rasmus på luffen	Rasmus and the Vagabond	Olle Hellbom	Sweden	
1984	–	Peppi Dlinnyychulok	Pippi Longstocking	Margarita Mikaelyan	Soviet Union	
1984	Ronia, the Robber's Daughter	Ronja Rövardotter	Ronja, the Robber's Daughter	Tage Danielsson	Sweden	
1985	–	Emīla nedarbi	Emil i Lönneberga	Varis Brasla	Latvia	
1986	The Children of Noisy Village	Alla vi barn i Bullerbyn	The Six Bullerby Children	Lasse Hallström	Sweden	
1987	More About the Children of Noisy Village	Mer om oss barn i Bullerbyn	The Six Bullerby Children	Lasse Hallström	Sweden	
1987	Mio in the Land of Faraway	Mio min Mio	Mio, My Son	Vladimir Grammatikov	Sweden, Norway, Soviet Union, UK	
1988	The New Adventures of Pippi Longstocking	The New Adventures of Pippi Longstocking	Pippi Longstocking	Ken Annakin	USA	
1988	–	Kaka Ferskur	Pippi Longstocking	Todd Hughes	USA	
1988	–	Allrakäraste syster	Most Beloved Sister	Göran Carmback	Sweden	
1988	–	Go'natt Herr Luffare	Go'natt Herr Luffare	Daniel Bergman	Sweden	
1988	–	Gull-Pian	Gull-Pian	Staffan Götestam	Sweden	
1988	–	Nånting levande åt Lame-Kal	Nånting levande åt Lame-Kal	Magnus Nanne	Sweden	
1989	–	Hoppa högst	Hoppa högst	Johanna Hald	Sweden	
1989	Brenda Brave	Kajsa Kavat	Brenda Brave Helps Grandmother	Daniel Bergman	Sweden	
1989	–	Ingen rövare finns i skogen	Ingen rövare finns i skogen	Göran Carmback	Sweden	
1989	–	Peter och Petra	Peter och Petra	Agneta Elers-Jarleman	Sweden	
1990	–	Ohrožené prázdniny	Bill Bergson Lives Dangerously	Libuše Koutná	Czechoslovakia	
1990	–	Nils Karlsson Pyssling	Simon Small Moves In	Staffan Götestam	Sweden	
1990	–	Pelle flyttar till Komfusenbo	Pelle flyttar till Komfusenbo	Johanna Hald	Sweden	
1992	–	Lotta på Bråkmakargatan	The Children on Troublemaker Street	Johanna Hald	Sweden	
1993	–	Lotta flyttar hemifrån	The Children on Troublemaker Street	Johanna Hald	Sweden	
1995	–	Saltkråkan	Seacrow Island	Pernilla Skifs	Sweden	
1996	Bill Bergson Lives Dangerously	Kalle Blomkvist – Mästerdetektiven lever farligt	Bill Bergson Lives Dangerously	Göran Carmback	Sweden	
1997	Bill Bergson and the White Rose Rescue	Kalle Blomkvist och Rasmus	Bill Bergson and the White Rose Rescue	Göran Carmback	Sweden	
2009	Never Violence	Niemals Gewalt	Never Violence	David Aufdembrinke	Germany	

=== Films about Astrid Lindgren ===
==== Documentaries about Astrid Lindgren ====
Year	English title	Original title	Director	Country	Notes	References
1987		Ich bin ein Bullerbü-Kind. Astrid Lindgren im Gespräch mit Hansi Fischer.		Germany		
1989		Sonntagsgespräch mit Astrid Lindgren	Detlef Klotschke	Germany		
1990		Astrid Lindgrens Småland	Catharina Stackelberg	Sweden		
2014		Astrid – en berättelse	Kristina Lindström	Sweden		

==== Documentaries about works by Astrid Lindgren ====
Year	English title	Original title	Works by Astrid Lindgren	Director	Country	Notes	References
1969		Hej, Pippi – Wie Tom nach Schweden fuhr, um Pippi Langstrumpf zu suchen	Pippi Longstocking	Thomas Hoffmeister	Germany		
2014	Where Is Elle Kari and What Happened to Noriko-san?	Where Is Elle Kari and What Happened to Noriko-san?	Dirk Lives in Holland, Noriko-San: Girl of Japan	Dvorit Shargal	Israel		
2016	Africa! Sia Lives on Kilimanjaro	Africa! Sia Lives on Kilimanjaro	Sia Lives on Kilimanjaro	Dvorit Shargal	Israel		
2017	Where Is Lilibet the Circus Child and What Happened in Honolulu?	Where Is Lilibet the Circus Child and What Happened in Honolulu?	Lilibet, Circus Child	Dvorit Shargal	Israel		

==== Interviews with Astrid Lindgren ====
Year	English title	Original title	Director	Country	Notes	References
1989		Hier is... Adriaan van Dis (also Van Dis in de IJsbreker)	Ellen Jens	Netherlands	The interview is in English. It is from 21 May 1989 and was published as Episode 21 on the DVD Hier is... Adriaan van Dis. Honderd gesprekken. Deel IV..	

==== Narrative films ====
Year	English title	Original title	Director	Country	Notes	References
2018	Becoming Astrid	Unga Astrid	Pernille Fischer Christensen	Sweden		

== Animated film ==
Year	English title	Original title	Based on / related literature	Director	Country	Notes	References
1968	Junior and Karlson	Malysh i Karlson	Karlsson-on-the-Roof	Boris Stepantsev	Soviet Union		
1970	Karlson Returns	Karlson vernulsya	Karlsson-on-the-Roof	Boris Stepantsev	Soviet Union		
1985	Pippi Longstocking (ABC Weekend Special)	Pippi Longstocking (ABC Weekend Special)	Pippi Longstocking	Colin Chilvers	USA		
1997	Pippi Longstocking	Pippi Longstocking	Pippi Longstocking	Michael Schaack, Clive A. Smith	Sweden, Germany, Canada		
2002	–	Karlsson på taket	Karlsson-on-the-Roof	Vibeke Idsøe	Sweden, Norway		
2006	Lotta's Bike	Visst kan Lotta cykla	The Children on Troublemaker Street	Pelle Ferner	Sweden	The English version is released on the German DVD Lotta kann fast alles.	
2006	Lotta's Christmas Surprise	Visst kan Lotta nästan allting	The Children on Troublemaker Street	Pelle Ferner	Sweden	The English version is released on the German DVD Lotta kann fast alles.	
2007	Tomte Tummetott and the Fox	Tomte Tummetott und der Fuchs	The Tomten	Sandra Schießl	Germany	The English version is released on the German DVD Tomte Tummetott und der Fuchs.	
2013	That Boy Emil	Emil & Ida i Lönneberga	Emil i Lönneberga	Vibeke Idsøe	Sweden		
2019	The Tomten and the Fox	Reven og Nissen	The Tomten	Are Austnes	Norway		

== Television series ==
Year	English title	Original title	Based on / related literature	Director	Country	Notes	References
1964	Life on Seacrow Island	Vi på Saltkråkan	Seacrow Island	Olle Hellbom	Sweden		
1968-1971	Jackanory (10 episodes with Emil & Pippi)	Jackanory	–	Paul Stone	UK		
1969	Pippi Longstocking	Pippi Långstrump	Pippi Longstocking	Olle Hellbom	Sweden, Germany		
1974-1976	–	Michel aus Lönneberga	Emil i Lönneberga	Olle Hellbom	Sweden, Germany		
1997-1998	Pippi Longstocking	Pippi Longstocking	Pippi Longstocking	Paul Riley	Canada, Germany, Sweden		
2014	Ronja, the Robber's Daughter	Sanzoku no Musume Rōnya	Ronja, the Robber's Daughter	Goro Miyazaki	Japan		
2024	Ronja, the Robber's Daughter	Ronja Rövardotter	Ronja, the Robber's Daughter	Lisa James Larsson	Sweden		

== Video games ==
Year	English title	Original title	Based on / related literature	Developer	Platform/s	Country	Notes	References
2001	–	Här kommer Pippi Långstrump	Pippi Longstocking	Pan Vision	PC/Mac	Sweden		
2012	Pippi's Villa Villekulla	Pippis Villa Villekulla	Pippi Longstocking	Filimundus	iOS/Android	Sweden		
2024	World of Pippi Longstocking	Pippi Långstrumps Värld	Pippi Longstocking	Paper Play Games	iOS/Android	Sweden		

== See also ==
- Astrid Lindgren bibliography
- Astrid Lindgren's plays
