= Astrid Lindgren's plays =

Theatre plays written by Astrid Lindgren

Astrid Lindgren's plays are a number of theater plays written by Astrid Lindgren in the 1940s to 1970s. Part of the plays are based on her books, other stories were only written for theater. Since almost all of Astrid Lindgren's works have been staged for theater, this page only deals with the plays, whose scripts were written by Astrid Lindgren. Many of these works were published in the Swedish books Sex Pjäser för barn och ungdom (1950), Serverat, Ers Majestät! (1955) and Praeser för barn och ungdom. Other Samlingen (1968). Most of these works have not been translated into English. These include stories about well-known characters such as Kalle Blomquist or Pippi Longstocking, which were only written for the theater and were not published as prose.

== Plays ==
=== Kalle Blomkvist, Nisse Nöjd och Vicke på Vind ===
Kalle Blomkvist, Nisse Nöjd och Vicke på Vind (Kalle Blomkvist, Nisse Nöjd and Vicke på Vind) is a play by Astrid Lindgren.

Characters

- Kalle Blomkvist
- Anders Bengtsson
- Eva-Lotta Lisander
- Benka Forsberg
- Jonte
- Sixtus
- Hilda Krikonblad
- Hulda Krikonblad
- Nisse Nöjd
- Vicke på Vind
- Police officer Rudolf Rask

Plot

Kalle, Anders and Eva-Lotta of the White Rose are fighting with the Red Rose (Benka, Jonte and Sixtus) for the Stormumriken, a magical stone. One day the musicians Nisse Nöjd and Vicke på Vind arrive at the town. They want to earn money by making music, but they earn not enough. They decide to kidnap Hulda, the kind-hearted aunt of Kalle, who lives in a villa with her rich sister Hilda. They want to extort money from the rich Hilda. Instead of kidnapping Hulda, they kidnap Hilda, but she causes them some difficulties, tries to fight them off, throws the kidnappers' dishes onto the floor, etc. In addition, her sister Hulda cannot raise the money required to get Hilda back from the kidnappers. Kalle tries to find the kidnappers but is soon also caught and locked up along with Hilda. Meanwhile, the members of the White Rose and the Red Rose try to help Hulda. They finally manage to find the kidnappers' hiding place and are able to set Kalle and Hilda free. The kidnappers are taken into custody by the police.

Overview

In 1948 Astrid Lindgren wrote the play, which premiered at the Vår Teater in Stockholm in 1950. In 1966 the Swedish film Mästerdetektiven Blomkvist på nya äventyr was released, which is based on the play. In 1968 the play was published in the book Pjäser för barn och ungdom. andra samlingen. Even 60 years after its first publication, the play is still shown on Swedish theater stages. The play was performed under various titles: Kalle Blomkvist, Nisse Nöjd och Vicke på Vind and Mästerdetektiven Blomkvist på nya äventyr. A short version of the play was later released which was called Som dom gör i Amerika in America. The play is an independent story about Kalle Blomkvist and has not been translated into English.

Reception

Dramadirekt believed that, in contrast to the darker undertones of the books, the play is more of a satirical nature. In addition, the children stand for responsibility and reason, while the adults are presented as selfish or naive. Carina Bergius of Södermanlands Nyheter praised the strong dialogues of the play and also thought that the play makes the audience smile and laugh.

==== Som dom gör i Amerika in America ====
Som dom gör i Amerika in America (How they do it in America) is the short version of the play in one act. Kalle Blomquist and his friends do not appear in this version of the play. In this play, the street musicians Nisse and Vicke want to kidnap Hulda in order to extort money from her rich sister. Hulda calls for the police. The police officer Rask catches the criminals in front of the house. The kidnappers are stopped before they can kidnap anyone. This version of the play differs significantly from the original version. Som dom gör i Amerika was published in 1984 in the Swedish book Barnteater i en akt by Ingvar Holm & Ulla-Britt Janzon.

=== Mästerdetektiven Kalle Blomkvist: För kasperteater två korta akter ===
Mästerdetektiven Kalle Blomkvist: För kasperteater två korta akter (Master detective Kalle Blomkvist: For the Kaspertheater in two short acts) is a play by Astrid Lindgren.

Characters

- Kalle Blomkvist, 13-years-old
- Police officer Björk
- Mrs. Frida Fagerlund
- Bank robber

Plot

Police officer Björk is looking for the master detective Kalle Blomkvist, as all the money in the bank has been stolen by a thief.

An hour earlier, a masked man with a gun had robbed the bank. He had pointed the gun to the cashier and had forced the cashier to give him all the money.

Björk asks Kalle to help him to catch the thief. Kalle believes that the thief has disguised himself so that the police cannot recognize him. According to Kalle, the thief could even be looking like an old lady.

Suddenly an old lady named Frida Fagerlund arrives. She is holding a huge bag, which is big enough to hide the money from robbery. Therefore Kalle thinks the lady is the thief. It also looks like Mrs. Fagerlund is wearing a wig. Kalle believes that it is the thief, dressed up as an old lady. He decides to sneak up and pull the wig off Frida Fagerlund's head, but as soon as he pulls the hair, he realizes that the hair is real. Mrs. Fagerlund is angry and decides to go to the police and tell them about Kalle, who also decides to look for Björk.

Meanwhile the bank robber sneaks through the streets. Björk recognises him and wants to stop him, but the bank robber threatens him with his pistol. While Björk tries to distract the bank robber, Kalle sneaks up from behind. Kalle manages to take the gun away from the bank robber, who then runs away, and Kalle and Björk run after him. Then Mrs. Fagerlund suddenly comes around the corner. The bank robber runs straight to her and knocks her down, while he falls over her. Kalle and Björk, who are right behind him, also fall down. The bank robber lies under them. He says he is giving up and Björk arrests the bank robber.

Overview

Astrid Lindgren wrote the puppetry play in the 1950s. In 1955 the play was published in the Swedish book Serverat, Ers Majestät!, by Lindgren's friend Elsa Olenius, a pioneer in children's theater. She had previously staged some of Lindgren's plays, including plays about Pippi Longstocking. The story was not translated into English.

=== Serverat, Ers Majestät! ===
Serverat, Ers Majestät! (Served, Your Majesty!) is a play by Astrid Lindgren.

Characters

- King
- Princess Blendagull
- Kitchen boy Vicke Vire
- Count Gyllenbubbla
- Count Silverpluska
- Witch
- Court ladies
- Courtiers

Plot

The counts Gyllenbubbla and Silverpluska want to overthrow the king. They hope that the witch in the forest can help them. The witch gives them an enchanted pill. They want to put the pill into a cake for the king. As soon as the king will have eaten the cake, he should fall asleep and then do everything that he is told. The counts want to throw the king into prison. Then one of them is supposed to marry Princess Blendagull and become king, but they don't know which of them. Their plans are overheard by the Princess Blendagull and the kitchen boy Vicke Vire. While Princess Blendagull reports everything she has heard to her father, the king, Vicke goes to the witch, who gives Vicke two pills that can reveal lies and falsehood. Later the counts give the cake with the pill to the king. The king eats the cake, but secretly spits out the pill. In the meantime, the counts each eat a piece of cake with Vicke's fake pills. Then the king pretends to snore loudly. The counts wake him up. They believe that the pill has had its intended effect and want to put the king in jail. The king plays along and follows the counts, but Vicke has already contacted the courtiers. They release the king and capture the counts. When the king threatens to shoot the counts, they start to cry and tell the king that it was just a joke. Just when they say that, they shout cuckoo, because now Vicke's pills have had their effect, and they have to say cuckoo every time they lie. In the end the king forgives the counts. He employs Count Silverpluska as the treasurer and Count Gyllenbubbla as the accountant. He will never be able to get more loyal and honest servants. The smallest falsehoods and lies are immediately revealed by their cuckoo calls.

Overview

Astrid Lindgren wrote the play and is around 45 minutes long. In 1965 the play was recorded and shown on SVT1. In 1968 the play was published in the book Pjäser för barn och ungdom. andra samlingen by Rabén & Sjögren. Even 60 years after its first publication, the play is still shown on Swedish theater stages. The play was also translated into other languages, such as Finnish, or Danish, but it was not translated into English.

=== En fästmö till låns ===
En fästmö till låns (A fiancee to borrow) is a play by Astrid Lindgren.

Characters

- Julius Julén
- Tant Eufemia
- Karin Vinge
- Harald Engberg
- Julia Jönsson

Plot

Julius Julén studies ornithology. The study is financed by his aunt Eufemia, but she wants Julius to get married soon. Therefore, she explained to him that she would only continue to finance him, if he found a fiancée before the age of 25, but Julius is already 25 years old and his aunt puts him under pressure. Therefore, he writes to her that his roommate Karin Vinge is his fiancé, without telling Karin about it. Then Aunt Eufemia announces her visit. Julius reports to Karin on what he did, but Karin is not enthusiastic about it, especially because she already has a fiancé, Harald Engberg. Nevertheless, she tries to support Julius, but he could not tell Karin about everything he wrote to his aunt, so there are some misunderstandings. The situation becomes even more complicated when Karin's fiancée Harald arrives. In addition, Julius friend Julia comes for a visit and repeatedly tries to attract Julius' attention.

When Julia hears that Julius got engaged to Karin, she is shocked. Julia explains that she always thought Julius was different from all the other men and that she had always liked him, but now she is horrified because he stole Harald's fiancé. Julius says that he is not engaged to Karin and the two continue to talk. Julius realizes that Julia comes pretty close to his idea of a dream woman. She plays the harp and loves birds just like him. He asks her to marry him, which she agrees to do. Just as the two are hugging, Aunt Eufemia comes into the room. She is horrified that her nephew is flirting with two women at the same time. Julius explains that he only loves Julia and Karin is interested in Harald. Aunt Eufemia now accepts the engagement of Julia and Julius.

Overview

Astrid Lindgren wrote the play in the 1940s and is around 60 minutes long. In 1950 it was first published in the book Sex Pjäser för barn och ungdom by Rabén & Sjögren. Even 60 years after its first publication, the play is still shown on Swedish theater stages. In addition, the play was translated into other languages, for example into Romanian, or Finnish, but it was not translated into English.

Reception

The editors of Ålandstidningen believed that En fästmö till lans is a well-played comedy play with beautiful musical and dancing elements, and also makes the audience laugh.

=== Huvudsaken är att man är frisk ===
Huvudsaken är att man är frisk (The main thing is that you are healthy) is a play by Astrid Lindgren.

Characters

- Monika, a 16-year-old girl
- Lena, a 16-year-old girl
- Nobban, Lena's 11-year-old sister
- Göran, Lena's and Nobban's 18-year-old brother
- Klas, Göran's 18-year-old friend
- Fritjof Karlsson-Rask-Fagerlund, a robber
- Överkonstapel Blomkvist, senior sergeant
- Konstapel Afredsson, sergeant

Plot

Lena and Monika are alone with Lena's sister Nobban, who is only eleven years old and is her sisters' pain in the neck. Nobban is always in a good mood and lives according to the motto The main thing is that you are healthy. Not even the bad weather spoils her mood. The girls listen to the radio and hear that a dangerous robber is in the area. While Monika and Lena go into a store, Nobban stays home. Later, Klas, a friend of Nobban's brother Göran, comes into the house Nobban is scared at first, but finally realizes that it is Klas. Soon Göran arrives at the house as well. Nobban and Göran decide to scare the other girls. They want to pretend that Klas is the robber the police is looking for. Klas disguises himself as the robber and gets an old broken revolver. The girls, however, hear the plan, and they go into the house unnoticed by the others.

Monika and Lena plan to teach Klas a lesson. Lena suggests to contact the police to tell them that they saw someone who looks exactly like the robber near the house. The girls hope that the police will be on their way and that Klas will get into trouble. Meanwhile, the boys hide in the woodshed and Nobban goes into a shop. Lena and Monika, however, remain alone in the house. Suddenly there is a knock on the door. Fritjof Karlsson-Rask-Fagerlund enters and is the robber the police is looking for. He threatens Lena and Monika with a gun, but the girls believe that it is Klas and make fun of the robber. Only when the girls see his birthmark do they recognize who he is.

The robber threatens to shoot, but Monika and Lena can escape. Shortly afterwards, Fagerlund cuts the telephone cable. Klas comes into the house and is frightened when he sees the robber and asks him what he did to Monika and Lena. Before Fagerlund can answer, the police officers Blomkvist and Alfredsson arrive.

The police officers think that Klas is the robber. Even when Klas assures them that he is not Fagerlund, they do not believe him. They handcuff him while the real Fagerlund escapes. Only when Nobban and Göran get into the house can they clarify the story. Since the telephone doesn't work, the police officers ask Nobban to run to the nearest police station to call for reinforcements. Meanwhile, the police officers run into the forest to catch Fagerlund.

Göran is now alone in the house. Suddenly Fagerlund comes through the door with Lena and Monika. He points his gun at the girls and explains that the forest is full of police officers. Therefore, he will take the girls hostage and will not release them until he has managed to escape. Nobban quietly sneaks up to the criminal with a rolling pin. She knocks him down and Göran takes the gun from him. Later Blomkvist and Alfredsson get into the house and arrest Fagerlund.

Overview

Astrid Lindgren wrote the play in the 1940s. It is a crime comedy, that is about 45 minutes long. The story was first published in print in 1945. In 1950 it was published in the book Sex Pjäser för barn och ungdom by Rabén & Sjögren. Even 60 years after its first publication, the play is still shown on Swedish theater stages. In addition, the play was translated into other languages, such as Danish, but it was not translated into English.

Reception

Martin Hellström from Linköping University and author of the book Pippi på scen: Astrid Lindgren och teatern thought that Astrid Lindgren's plays from the 1940s should be used much more often in schools. He believed that the youngsters in the play were very modern for their time.

=== Snövit ===
Snövit (Snow White) is a play by Astrid Lindgren.

Characters

- Snövit
- Queen Sandra
- Prince Gudmund
- Lady Matilda
- Hunter Hubert Jägare
- Elves
- Wizard
- Dwarves
  - Puck
  - Muck
  - Mack
  - Jack
  - Pim
  - Tim
  - Lille Tom
- Cat

Plot

Queen Sandra is jealous of her stepdaughter Snövit, who is beautiful and gets even more beautiful every day. As soon as Snövit marries a prince, Snövit will become the queen of the country and will replace Queen Sandra. Queen Sandra wants to prevent that.

One day Prince Gudmund av Burgundy visits the castle. The queen tries to prevent Snövit and the prince from falling in love with each other, so she instructs a magician to transform Snövit into a little, stupid girl. Nevertheless, the prince and Snövit fall in love with each other and they even want to get married. Queen Sandra then asks hunter to kill Snövit, but when the hunter refuses, the queen threatens to kill his entire family, including his children. Eventually the hunter goes into the forest with Snövit, who convinces the hunter not to kill animals anymore, because the animals are sad when one of their own is dying. The hunter cannot kill Snövit either. Snövit wants to go back to the castle, but the hunter says she can't go there, otherwise the queen will kill his children. He cannot stay in the forest with her either, since he has to tell the Queen about his alleged deed. Therefore, the desperate Snövit remains alone in the forest.

Later Snövit sees a small house. She goes into the house, eats something and goes to bed. In the evening, the residents of the house, the seven dwarfs, come back from their work in the copper mine. When they hear Snövit's story, they welcome her to the house, but they warn her to be careful when they are working and not to open the door to anyone.

When the queen finds out that Snövit is still alive, she decides to kill her. She asks the wizard to turn her into an old man and get her a beautiful apple, which is fatally poisonous. Then she visits Snövit. She convinces Snövit to eat the apple, which she does and Snövit sinks motionless onto the ground. Then the queen disappears.

Later, the dwarfs carry Snövit on a bier through the forest. Prince Gudmund has been looking for Snövit everywhere and is horrified when he sees her lying motionless on the bier. The prince shakes her and tells her to wake up. Then Snövit opens her eyes and she lives. The prince and the seven dwarfs are overjoyed. When Snövit tells the prince what happened, he is horrified. He explains that they should ride back to the castle together.

Meanwhile, Queen Sandra subjects suspect that the queen is responsible for the disappearance of Snövit and want to overthrow the queen. The hunter says Queen Sandra should leave the city because her people no longer accept her as a queen. Just when the queen says that Snövit is dead and she is the only queen, Snövit arrives, and the people are cheering: "Our Queen". While the queen is horrified, the hunter is overjoyed that Snövit is alive. He apologizes to her for leaving her alone in the forest. Snövit is named the new queen, while queen Sandra has to leave the kingdom.

Overview

Astrid Lindgren wrote the play in the 1940s. The script is based on the story Snow White of the Brothers Grimm. It was first published in 1950 in the book Sex Pjäser för barn och ungdom by Rabén & Sjögren. Even 60 years after its first publication, the play is still shown on Swedish theater stages. In 2018, the book Snövit, which contains the play, was published by the Astrid Lindgren-sällskapets. The play is approximately 90 minutes long. The story was not translated into English.

Astrid Lindgren's first book Snövit Barnens Julkalender contained a story about Snow White. Lindgren received the book in 1911. On the cover there was a picture by Jenny Nyström, who had drawn Snow White, the character that has long black hair and a little red cap. Astrid Lindgren loved this book and read it over and over again. Her book inspired Lindgren to write a play about Snövit.

Reception

Turun Sanomat praised the play by Astrid Lindgren. Unlike the story of the Grimm brothers, in which Snow White is portrayed as fragile and vulnerable, Snövit is portrayed as a strong-willed, self-confident woman. The latter knows exactly what she wants, namely Prince Gudmund. When the queen asks her to dress more childishly on her 15th birthday, Snövit behaves like a six-year old to defy her stepmother. Turun said that there are many interesting things happening in the story to make even the smallest viewer happy.

=== Jag vill inte vara präktig ===
Jag vill inte vara präktig (I don't want to be splendid) is a play by Astrid Lindgren.

Characters

- Mrs. Arvidson
- Barbro Arvidson, Ms. Arvidson's 18-year-old daughter
- Marianne Arvidson, Mrs. Arvidson's 20-year-old daughter
- Klas Arvidson, Mrs. Arvidson's 13-year-old son
- Fritiof af Kornick, scientist

Plot

The sisters Barbro and Marianne live in a small house with their mother and 13-year-old brother Klas. The family is poor and can hardly afford anything. Marianne decides to find a rich husband. Barbro's mother also believes she can benefit from Marianne's marriage to a rich man, but Barbro doesn't understand why Marianne wants to have a rich husband, as other things are more important to her.

In the family's garden there is a rune stone. Scientists often stay at the house to research the stones. The archaeologist Fritiof af Kornick arrives when Marianne and her mother are attending a party. He only meets Barbro and they get along very well. Barbro assists the scientist with his work. In the evening they sit together on a bench. Fritiof says that he will never make much money with his scientific work and can not take care of Barbro, while Barbro replies that she never wanted to marry a rich man who gives her money, and she wants to be an independent woman. Fritiof says that he is happy to get a chance with her even though he is a very poor man. Klas overhears the conversation and tells his family about it. Marianne and her mother don't want Barbro to have a relationship with a poor scientist like Fritiof. Marianne even makes fun of Barbro for falling in love with such a poor man.

Then suddenly a letter from Marianne's friend Lillemor arrives. She writes to Marianne that Fritiof is a rich man from a very wealthy brewery family. Marianne decides to make Fritiof fall in love with her, while Barbro pretends that she won't mind. From then on Marianne spends time with Fritiof, while Barbro tries to avoid seeing him.

Klas doesn't like Barbro's behaviour and tells her that he cares about her. Klas knows that she loves Fridiof. Therefore, Barbro should fight for Fridiof, but Barbro explains that he should not interfere. She thinks that she doesn't have a chance with Fridiof anyway, because Marianne always gets what she wants.

Later Klas lets Fridiof know that Barbro is in love with him and also gives Fridiof the letter from Lillemor. Fridiof learns that Marianne might only like to marry him because of his money. Nevertheless, he makes her a marriage proposal and she accepts. Then Fridiof declares that he has a rich cousin with the same name. His cousin is also a scientist and the owner of a wealthy brewery, although Fridiof cannot offer that to Marianne. When Marianne hears this, she asks for time to consider whether she really wants to marry Fridiof or not. She later explains that initially she only spoke to Fridiof because he seemed to be rich, but now she has fallen in love with him. She always wanted a rich man, but she can imagine marrying him, even without the money, but she also knows which lifestyle she has to give up. Therefore she had asked for time to think. Then she mentions that she realised that she loves him, but he doesn't love her and never will. Therefore, she no longer needs to think about the marriage. She has to learn to fall out of love. Fridiof says that the conversation went very differently from what he had imagined and that he is sorry. Marianne then asks if Fridiof loves Barbro, which he confirms.

When Marianne leaves the room, Barbro arrives. Fridiof asks her to marry him, but Barbro hesitates to accept the marriage proposal, as she doesn't want to marry a rich man. She did not like to listen to her sister and mother when they talked about rich men. She also fears people might think that she married Fritiof just for his money, but ultimately she agrees to marry him. Fritiof now explains that he doesn't have much money, as he only gets his salary from the museum where he works. He tells her about his rich cousin with the same name. Barbro is relieved and tells Fritiof about her plan to become a nurse.

Overview

Astrid Lindgren wrote the play in the 1940s. In 1950, it was first published in the book Sex Pjäser för barn och ungdom by Rabén & Sjögren. The story was not translated into English.

Reception

Martin Hellström from the Linköping University and author of the book Pippi på scen: Astrid Lindgren och teatern thought that Astrid Lindgren's plays from the 1940s should be used much more often in schools. He believed that the young adults from the play were very modern for their time.

=== Jul hos Pippi Långstrump ===
Jul hos Pippi Långstrump (Christmas at Pippi Longstocking) is a play by Astrid Lindgren.

Characters

- Pippi Långstrump
- Tommy: Pippi's best friend and brother of Annika
- Annika: Pippi's best friend and sister to Tommy
- Lur-Pelle: a villain who becomes friendly

Plot

Pippi decorates her Christmas tree. Later, Tommy and Annika visit Pippi. Tommy is surprised to see a Falukorv sausage on Pippi's Christmas tree, but Pippi believes it is a normal Christmas decoration. Then the children get their Christmas presents. Annika receives a doll while Tommy is gets a toy car. Pippi, on the other hand, is given a rubber mask with a ghost face by Tommy and Annika, which she would like to try out right away. When Tommy and Annika tell her that they have heard at school that many children in the world do not have enough food, Pippi wants to help these children. She looks for her gold and puts it in her backpack to give to the children. This way, they are able to buy everything they need from the money. Pippi imagines a boy named Oskar who has nothing to eat and is very sorry for him. Then the three friends hear someone sneaking around Pippi's villa, who is revealed to be Lur-Pelle who wants to steal Pippi's backpack with the gold. Pippi scares him with the ghost mask. When Lur-Pelle hears about the poor, hungry children, he also wants to do something good for them and takes ten cents out of his pocket. He gives the coins to Pippi so that she can give the money to the poor children. Then Pippi, Tommy, Annika and Lur-Pelle celebrate Christmas together. They dance around the Christmas tree and sing self-made Christmas carols. Afterwards the audience is asked to be as generous as Lur-Pelle and to donate something for the children in the world who are not doing so well.

Overview

Astrid Lindgren wrote the play in the 1960s and is about 30 minutes long. In 1968 it was first published in the book Pjäser för barn och ungdom. Andra Samlingen by Rabén & Sjögren. The story was not translated into English.

=== Pippi Långstrumps liv och leverne ===
Pippi Långstrumps liv och leverne (Pippi Longstockings Life and Time) is a play by Astrid Lindgren.

Characters

- Pippi Långstrump
- Tommy
- Annika
- Police officers Karlsson and Larsson
- Miss
- Mrs. Granberg
- Mrs. Alexandersson
- Mrs. Settergren
- Dunderkarlsson
- Blom
- Efraim Långstrump
- Pupils

Plot

Pippi Långstrump lives alone with her horse and her monkey in the Villa Villekulla. She does a lot of pranks, such as when she puts her head into a cake or escapes from the police.

Overview

Astrid Lindgren wrote the play in the 1940s. In the spring of 1946, the play was shown on stage for the first time. It was staged by Lindgren's friend Elsa Olenius, a pioneer in the Swedish children's theater. The premiere took place in the Vår Teater in Stockholm. In 1950 the play was published in the book Sex Pjäser för barn och ungdom by Rabén & Sjögren. Even 60 years after its first publication, the play is still shown on Swedish theater stages. The story was not translated into English.

=== Pippi Långstrump – Musical ===
The musical Pippi Långstrump was written by Astrid Lindgren in the early 1980s. Siw Malmkvist played the title role of Pippi Longstocking. The story is based on the Pippi Longstocking novel.

Characters

- Pippi Longstocking (Siw Malmkvist)
- Tommy (Bengt Stenberg/Niklas Rygert)
- Annika (Pernilla Wahlgren/Nadja Sandberg)
- Mrs. Prysselius (Meg Westergren)
- Mrs. Settergren (Helena Kallenbäck)
- Captain Ephraim Longstocking (Kent Malmström)
- Thunder-Karlsson (Ulf Brunnberg)
- Blom (Sune Mangs)
- Police inspector Klang (Hans Wahlgren)
- Police inspector Kling (Gunilla Åkesson)
- The strong Adolf (Håkan Westerlund)
- Ringmaster (Ivar Wahlgren)
- School teacher (Christina Schollin)

Songs

- Snäll och lydig, hel och ren (text: Astrid Lindgren, music: Georg Riedel)
- Världens starkaste tjej (text: Astrid Lindgren, music: Georg Riedel)
- Tror du inte jag kan dansa schottis? (text: Astrid Lindgren, music: Georg Riedel)
- Pappa var är du? (text: Astrid Lindgren, music: Georg Riedel)
- Pluttifikation (Varför ja'nte kan nå'n) (text: Astrid Lindgren, music: Georg Riedel)
- Hej-hå! (text: Astrid Lindgren, music: Georg Riedel)
- Farväl, farväl (text: Astrid Lindgren, music: Georg Riedel)

Overview

In the early 1980s, Astrid Lindgren wrote a musical about Pippi Longstocking. She wanted Siw Malmkvist to play the role of Pippi Longstocking. At the age of 43, Siw Malmkvist felt too old for the role and initially turned it down, but since Astrid Lindgren stated that without Malmkvist there would be no Pippi Musical, Malmkvist eventually agreed to play Pippi. From 1980 to 1981 the musical was shown at the Folkan theatre in Stockholm. After that there was a tour through the folk parks in Sweden. The musical was directed by Staffan Götestam, who also played Jonathen in The Brothers Lionheart and directed several of Lindgren's other films. Astrid Lindgren wrote many of the songs exclusively for the musical. Only a few songs like Härkommer Pippi Långstrump or Sov alla were already played in other Pippi Longstocking film adaptations. In 1980 the album Pippi på Folkan was published. The musical was also recorded for Sveriges Television and was broadcast on television.

=== Other plays ===
Astrid Lindgren also wrote screenplays for the plays Rasmus, Pontus och Toker, Rasmus på luffen, Ingen rövare finns i skogen, Pippi Långstrump, Storasyster och lillebror, Karlsson på taket: hemskt drama i två akter, Mio, min Mio, Emil i Lönneberga, Kalas i Lönneberga and Mästerdetektiven Blomkvist. These stories were all performed theater, filmed and published in book form. Rasmus på luffen was released in English as Rasmus and the Vagabond, Mästerdetektiven Blomkvist as Bill Bergson, Master Detective, Pippi Långstrump as Pippi Longstocking, Karlsson på taket: hemskt drama i två akter as Karlsson-on-the-Roof, Mio, min Mio as Mio, My Son, Emil i Lönneberga as Emil i Lönneberga, and Mästerdetektiven Blomkvist as Bill Bergson, Master Detective. Ingen rövare finns i skogen, Rasmus, Pontus och Toker and Storasyster och lillebror have been released in Sweden and other countries as a picture book or novel, but there is no English edition. Rasmus, Pontus och Toker was released as a novel, but was also not translated into English.

== Books ==
- Huvudsaken är att man är frisk (Lindfors: 1945)
- Pippi Långstrumps liv och leverne: Teaterpjäs för barn (Rabén & Sjögren: 1946)
- Mästerdetektiven Blomkvist: Teaterpjäs för barn (Rabén & Sjögren: 1948)
- Sex pjäser för barn och ungdom (Rabén & Sjögren: 1950, six plays: Pippi Långstrumps liv och leverne, Mästerdetektiven Blomkvist, Huvudsaken är att man är frisk, En fästmö till låns, Jag vill inte vara präktig, Snövit)
- Spela teater : Pjäser och anvisningar för skolor (Rabén & Sjögren: 1950, two plays: Storasyster och lillebror, Mästerdetektiven Blomkvist)
- Pjäser för barn och ungdom - första samlingen (Rabén & Sjögren: 1959, five plays: Pippi Långstrumps liv och leverne, Mästerdetektiven Blomkvist, Huvudsaken är att man är frisk, En fästmö till låns, Jag vill inte vara präktig)
- Pjäser för barn och ungdom - andra samlingen (Rabén & Sjögren: 1968, six plays: Ingen rövare finns i skogen; Jul hos Pippi Långstrump; Serverat, Ers Majestät!; Rasmus, Pontus och Toker; Rasmus på luffen; Kalle Blomkvist, Nisse Nöjd och Vicke på Vind, 1968)
- Karlsson på taket: hemskt drama i två akter (Riksteatern: 1969)
- Barnteater i en akt (LiberFörlag: 1984, play: Som dom gör i Amerika)
- Snövit (Astrid Lindgren-sällskapet: 2018)

== Literature ==
- Martin Hellström: Pippi på scen. Astrid Lindgren och teatern. Makadam. 2015
- Karin Helander: Skratt och lek, saga och fantasi: Astrid Lindgren på scenen. In: Vänbok till Sonja Svensson edited by Jan Hansson and Gallie Eng. 76–84. Stockholm: Opal. 2008

== See also ==
- Astrid Lindgren bibliography
- List of adaptations of works by Astrid Lindgren
