= I Don't Want to Go to Bed =

I Don't Want to Go to Bed may refer to:

- I Don't Want to Go to Bed (album), a 1995 album by Cul de Sac
- I Don't Want to Go to Bed (book), a children's book by Astrid Lindgren
