= Oskar Löfkvist =

Swedish actor (born 1980)

Johan Oskar Löfkvist (born 27 September 1980) is a Swedish actor.

== Filmography ==
- Beck – Lockpojken (1997)
- Nils Karlsson Pyssling (1990)
