= Mirabelle (Astrid Lindgren book) =

2002 children's book

- Author: Astrid Lindgren
- Original title: Mirabell
- Illustrator: Pija Lindenbaum
- Language: Swedish
- Publisher: Rabén & Sjögren
- Publication date: 2002
- Publication place: Sweden
- English publication date: 2003

Mirabelle (original title: Mirabell) is a children's book written by Astrid Lindgren.

== Plot ==
Britta-Kajsa's greatest wish is to get a doll, However dolls are very expensive and her parents cannot afford to buy her one because they have limited financial resources .

One day, when Britta-Kajsa's parents are at work, Britta-Kajsa meets a strange little man. The latter asks Britta-Kajsa to open a gate for him so that he can drive through it with his carriage. Britta-Kajsa does as she is told. The little man explains that he can't give her any money, but a tiny little seed that she can plant into the garden.

Some time after Britta-Kajsa planted the seed, a doll grows out of it. Britta-Kajsa shows the doll to her amazed parents who cannot believe what they see. Later, Britta-Kajsa takes the doll into her room. Suddenly the doll starts to speak and says that her name is Mirabelle. From then on, Britta-Kajsa and Mirabelle do almost everything together. Britta-Kajsa thinks she has the greatest doll in the world.

== Background ==
Mirabelle was first published in 1948 in the Swedish magazine Vi. In 1949 it was published in the fairy tale collection Nils Karlsson Pyssling. In 1950 Astrid Lindgren was awarded the Nils Holgersson Plaque for this book.

A picture book was published in Sweden in 2002 and was illustrated by Pija Lindenbaum.

The book has been adapted into several theater plays.

== Analysis ==
According to Jens Andersen the doll Mirabelle is a manifestation of Britta-Kajsa's "need for closeness, friendship, and affection".

Gabriele Cromme said Britta-Kajsa shows the characteristics of a well-behaved girl. She wants a doll as a toy, is helpful towards strangers, has intuition and accepts her parents' values without contradiction. The female aspects of Britta-Kajsa become even stronger when she starts behaving like a caring mom who loves her pretty daughter (the doll). At first the doll is only interested in her new clothes. Later the doll shows self-confidence (the doll insists on the name Mirabelle), wildness, naughtiness and self-determination, for example when she tells Britta-Kajsa what she doesn't want to eat.

== Reception ==
Maria Ribbeck praised the illustrations by Pija Lindenbaum, calling them wonderful, with rich colors and a crazy chicken appearing on every page.

Galline Volanti praised the illustrations and text by Astrid Lindgren. She said that the story never gets boring and is never exaggerated, never bland, often brilliant and always meaningful.
