= In the Land of Twilight =

1994 book by Astrid Lindgren

- Author: Astrid Lindgren
- Original title: I Skymningslandet
- Illustrator: Marit Törnqvist
- Language: Swedish
- Genre: Children's literature, fantasy
- Publisher: Rabén & Sjögren
- Publication date: 1994
- Publication place: Sweden
- English publication date: 2012

In the Land of Twilight (original title: I Skymningslandet) is a children's book written by Astrid Lindgren.

== Plot ==
Göran has a sick leg. Since a year, he has to stay in bed. One night he hears that his parents say that he will never be able to walk again. Göran is desperate, but that very evening he is visited by Mr. Lilyvale from the land of twilight. Mr. Lilyvale flies with Göran to his land. There Göran eats candy that grows on trees, drives a tram, visits the king, dances and sings. Then Mr. Lilyvale brings Göran home. Göran is no longer sad about his sick leg. Because every evening at dawn Mr. Lilyvale comes back and brings Göran to the land of twilight where Göran is able to fly.

== Background ==
Mr. Lilyvale (Swedish: Herr Liljonkvast) was a fantasy friend of Lindgren's daughter Karin. As a small flying old man, he visited her in her room in the evening. Lindgren's daughter explained that Mr. Lilyvale could not be seen by anyone else because he flew away and hid as soon as someone entered the room. Mr. Lilyvale is a more pleasant and friendly predecessor of Karlsson-on-the-Roof, into whom Mr. Lilyvale later turned, according to Astrid Lindgren.

The story takes place in locations near Astrid Lindgren's apartment at Dalagatan 46 in Stockholm. In front of the Odenplan station on the north side of Odengatan there is a row of houses in which the fairy tale begins. From there, the protagonists move across Stockholm. They can see the old town including the entertainment island of Djurgården, the Klara quarters, the Kronobergsparken, the museum Skansen, and they visit the island of Stadsholmen with the royal castle.

Although it is never mentioned directly, the Land of Twilight has all features of the afterlife world: it is inhabited by elderly people, or people wearing old-fashioned costumes; only rarely can Göran see children, including a girl with a kind face who he knew in the primary school, but Mr. Lilyvale mentions that she has long been in the Land of Twilight.

In the Land of Twilight was first published in 1948 in the Swedish magazine Vi. Later it was published in the fairy tale collection Nils Karlsson Pyssling in 1949. In 1950 Astrid Lindgren was awarded the Nils Holgersson Plaque for this book. In 1994 it was published in Sweden as a picture book. In 2012 this picture book was translated into English.

== Reception ==
Silke Schnettler from the Frankfurter Allgemeine Zeitung praises book. She believes that text and images complement each other in a unique way. Schnettler thinks that the story is deeply sad on the one hand. On the other hand, it gives consolation. With the power of his imagination, the boy can free himself from the oppressive reality.

The Focus lists In the Land of Twilight among the best seven books for young readers. The magazine describes the book as one of the most beautiful dream stories of Astrid Lindgren, also calling it enchanting.

When Lindgren biographer Birgit Dankert was asked by Die Zeit about her favorite scene in Lindgren's books, she mentioned a scene from In the Land of Twilight. In this scene, Mr. Lilyvale replies to all of Göran's fears and concerns with the soothing sentence ".. does not matter in the land of twilight". Even when both fly over Stockholm and Göran is afraid because he thinks that he is not able to do anything at all, the reassuring sentence "Nothing matters" was mentioned. Then Dankert takes a deep breath.

The book is recommended by organizations of nursing help (Superhands of the Johanniter), palliative medicine or hospices (Palliativzentrum Unna, Kinder- und Jugendhospiz Regenbogenland).
