= My Nightingale Is Singing =

1959 children's book by Astrid Lindgren

- Author: Astrid Lindgren
- Original title: Spelar min lind, sjunger min näktergal
- Illustrator: Svend Otto S.
- Language: Swedish
- Publisher: Rabén & Sjögren
- Publication date: 1959
- Publication place: Sweden
- English publication date: 1985

My Nightingale Is Singing (original title: Spelar min lind, sjunger min näktergal) is a children's book written by Astrid Lindgren.

== Plot ==
When Maria is eight years old, her parents die from tuberculosis, and she is sent to a poorhouse, where residents live in isolation and difficult conditions.

Pompadella is the manager of the poor house. Since she expects to get more things while begging when she takes a child with her, she asks Maria to come with her. From now on, Maria accompanies Pompadella when Pompadella goes begging. Together they are very successful.

Maria also supports the other residents. She helps Hen-Helen to tie her shoes, gives Dearie-Dearie her wool when she has dropped it or consoles Joey Squint when he gets scared because he hears voices. She however finds no comfort for herself because Maria is not able to discover something beautiful.

One day when she goes begging with Pompadella she hears a story that gives her strength and comfort. She wants to keep the story in her mind forever, but the only thing she can remember is the line "My linden plays, my nightingale is singing". At first, all the miseries and sorrows disappear from the poor house when Maria thinks about these words, but the words are not enough anymore, and then Maria wants to have a real linden with a real nightingale.

One day Maria sees a pea lying on the floor. She plants it on the poor house's potato field, hopes and prays for it to become a linden. She tells Joey Squint that as soon as the linden sounds and the nightingale sings, he won't hear any more voices.

The next morning there is a linden in the field, but it doesn't sound and there is no nightingale sitting on the tree. The linden cannot comfort the residents of the house. Maria runs to the linden at night. She feels that the linden is dead, that there is no life and that no soul lives in it. Then Maria decides to give the tree her own soul. From now on she continues to live in the linden and hears the nightingale singing every evening.

The next morning, Maria has disappeared, but the linden is full of life. The most beautiful music sounds from it and a nightingale sits on it. It suddenly becomes beautiful and joyful in the poor house. The residents often ask about Maria. Only Joey Squint hears the linden whisper "It's me, Maria".

== Characters ==
Astrid Lindgren describes the type of people who were living in poor houses at that time. They were old, poor, frail, sick, unable to work, starving, having mental disorders or were orphans:

- Maria is eight years old. Her parents have died from tuberculosis. Since people are afraid of getting infected, nobody takes care of her. Maria has to live in the poor house.
- Pompadella is the manager of the poor house. She is the only one who has her own room, which she only shares with the bedbugs.
- Joey Squint is an old man who has lost his mind. He hears voices, which is why he often hits his head against the wall.
- Fuggy is the ugliest person in the whole village. The people scare their children with stories about him. He is actually harmless, very kind and would never harm anyone.
- Gaffer has a wooden leg.
- Hen-Helen has a bleary eye and crooked fingers.
- Dearie-Dearie is old and often drops its balls. She wraps its yarn from one ball to the next and is her only occupation.

== Background ==
My Nightingale Is Singing was first published in 1959 in the Swedish magazine Vi. In 1960 it was published in the fairy tale collection Nils Karlsson Pyssling.

In 1984 Rabén & Sjögren published My Nightingale Is Singing (Spelar min lind, sjunger min näktergal) as a picture book, illustrated by Svend Otto S. English, Danish and German editions of the book followed later. In the Swedish edition of the book Maria is called Malin.

The lines "My linden plays, my nightingale is singing" which make Maria so happy can be found a Swedish fairy tale. In the fairy tale, a woman is separated from her husband and child. Full of longing she searches for her family and asks: "Does my linden play? Does my nightingale sing? Is my little child crying? Will my husband ever be happy in his life again?"

In 1995 Jörn Arnecke wrote a German children's and youth opera of the book. Between 1995 and 1998, the prologue, the final scene and other parts of the opera were performed in theaters. In Denmark a musical of the book was made.

== Reception ==
Frankfurter Allgemeine Zeitung author Monika Osberghaus introduced My Nightingale Is Singing in the series My Favorite Fairy Tales. To her the book is the saddest of all Lindgren fairy tales. It allows the reader "to grieve uncontrollably and to feel sorry for the characters with great and serious dedication", but it also tells of the consolation and comfort that literature can give.

Søren Fanø wondered what the target audience of the book is. Svend Otto S.'s drawings clearly appeal to children, while Astrid Lindgren's text suits a more mature target group. In any case, he did not recommend the book to children less than nine years old.

As a child, the Danish crime writer Lotte Hammer was deeply touched by the story and the words "Does my linden play? Does my nightingale sing?". The story showed her how far a person can get if the person has hope and faith.
