= Ulla Sallert =

Swedish actress and singer

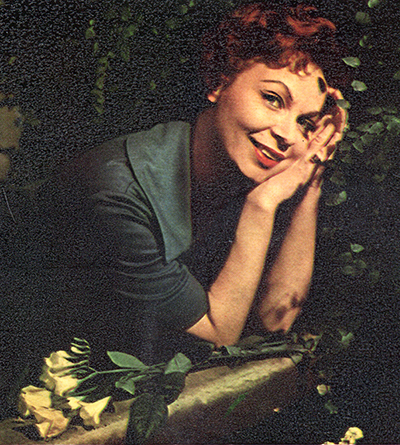
- Sallert in 1960
- Born: 27 March 1923; Stockholm, Sweden
- Died: 11 May 2018 (aged 95)
- Occupations: Actress, singer
- Years active: 1946–2018

Ulla Sallert (27 March 1923 – 11 May 2018) was a Swedish actress and singer.

Sallert was born in Stockholm, and studied singing at the Royal Swedish Academy of Music. Her debut performance was in an operetta at Oscarsteatern in 1944, and she became one of the foremost operetta and musical singers in Sweden in the 1950s. Sallert was part of the original cast of Ben Franklin in Paris; the role of Diane de Vobrillac was written especially for her. Her last role was the Duchess in Me and My Girl, which she performed several times in the 2010s.

== Selected filmography ==
- Evening at the Djurgarden (1946)
- Don't Give Up (1947)
- The Key and the Ring (1947)
- Voyage in the Night (1955)
- Hello Baby (1976)
- Nils Karlsson Pyssling (1990)

== Bibliography ==
- Ethan Mordden. Open a New Window: The Broadway Musical in the 1960s. Palgrave Macmillan, 2002.
