= Scrap and the Pirates =

Book by Astrid Lindgren

- Author: Astrid Lindgren
- Original title: Skrållan och Sjörövarna
- Language: Swedish
- Publisher: Rabén & Sjögren
- Publication date: 1967
- Publication place: Sweden
- English publication date: 1968
- Preceded by: Seacrow Island

Scrap and the Pirates, also Skrallan and the Pirates (original title: Skrållan och Sjörövarna) is a children's book written by Astrid Lindgren.

== Plot ==
In the summer Scrap (Swedish: Skrållan) lives on an island called Seacrow Island. She watches her grandfather Melcher and her father Peter eagerly roofing the house, while her mother Malin hangs up the laundry. Scrap loves her funny grandfather who often falls from the roof or into the sea.

Scrap also has a little uncle, Pelle, who only is ten years old. On Sea Crow Island there are also Tjorven, her dog Bootsmann, her two parents Nisse and Märta, as well as Stina and her grandfather. The sisters of Tjorven and Pelle's older brothers always do something together and Scrap has little contact with them. She prefers to spend time with Pelle, Tjorven and Stina. With the latter, she also celebrates her third birthday on the landing stage.

One day Tjorven, Pelle, Stina and Scrap play hide-and-seek with Melcher. Melcher lies down on a place where the chickens previously laid their eggs. His pants are totally dirty. Meanwhile, Pelle has completely forgotten that they are playing hide-and-seek. He watches a large grasshopper in the grass because he loves animals more than anything.

When Scrap tries to go on the seesaw with the dog Bootsmann, it doesn't work at all. Bootsmann weighs a lot more than she does, so her part of the seesaw is always up in the air. Later, the children play sack jumping.

Then they go to an old ship and fight there as gangs of pirates. They keep getting in the way of Mr. Vesterman, who wants to work there. Before going home, Scrap plays boating in a small basket. She thinks it was a very nice day.

== Background ==
Scrap and the Pirates (Skrållan och sjörövarna) was first published in 1967 by Rabén & Sjögren. The book Scrap and the Pirates is based on the films Tjorven och Skrållan and Tjorven och Mysak. The films were released in some countries, while in others only the book was released. While the book was translated into English, the films were not. The pictures in the book were taken during the shooting of the films.

The story takes place after the events of the Seacrow Island novel. Some events of the book are also described in the films, while others are completely new.

The book takes place on the fictional holiday island Seacrow Island. The island doesn't really exist, but some real places are mentioned in the book, including Söderöra, Furusund and Rödlöga. Thus, Seacrow Island is located on the northern Stockholm Archipelago.

The photos from the book are from Sven-Eric Delér and Stig Hallgren. The text is written by Astrid Lindgren.

== Reception ==
Yvonne Bauer from Stern believed that the story is far away from dealing with the pragmatic everyday topics that are described in most current children's books. Instead, it is about children and adults who do funny and stupid things.

Annika Jürgens of Eltern thought that the story is timelessly beautiful, also saying that the title is a great book for reading aloud with beautiful photos.

Kerstin Reinke from hoppsala.de believed that the figures are lovingly depicted, and that Astrid Lindgren tells the story with a lot of wit and charm.
