= I Want to Go to School Too =

Children's book by Astrid Lindgren

- Author: Astrid Lindgren
- Original title: Jag vill också gå i skolan
- Illustrator: Ilon Wikland; Birgitta Nordenskjöld
- Language: Swedish
- Publisher: Rabén & Sjögren
- Publication date: 1951
- Publication place: Sweden
- English publication date: 1980

I Want to Go to School Too (original title: Jag vill också gå i skolan) is a children's book written by Astrid Lindgren. It is about Peter and his sister Lena, who previously appeared in the book I Want a Brother or Sister.

== Plot ==
Lena wants to go to school, so her older brother Peter takes her with him one day. Peter shows her the way to school and explains on which streets Lena should be very careful. Then Lena gets to know the school. She is allowed to sit on the chair of Lisa, who is sick that day and cannot come to school. Lena watches Peter who is calculating and writing. During the break, Lena and Peter play in the playground of the school. When Peter's classmate Pelle says he thinks it is stupid to take small children to school, Pelle and Peter have a fight. Lena is afraid, but does not show it, so she is happy when the school bell rings and the biology class starts. Here Lena is able to contribute something to the lesson, because she realizes that the bird the teacher shows to the students is a chaffinch. Lena also accompanies Peter at breakfast in the dining room, during gymnastics and reading. After all, Pelle doesn't seem to mind small children at school anymore. When Lena and Peter are getting home, Lena is happy to know exactly how Peter's school is like.

== Background ==
I Want to Go to School Too (Jag vill också gå i skolan) was first published in Sweden in 1951 and was illustrated by Birgitta Nordenskjöld. In 1979 a new Swedish edition with pictures from Ilon Wikland was released. This book was translated into English in 1980. It has been translated into at least 20 different languages.

Astrid Lindgren published two books dealing with the lives of the siblings Peter and Lena. I Want a Brother or Sister is the first book followed by the second one I Want to Go to School Too. In I Want a Brother or Sister Peter gets his sister Lena and a brother, Mats, who isn't mentioned in I Want to Go to School Too.

== Analysis ==
According to Kretschmann, Behring and Dobrindt Astrid Lindgren describes the experiences of a child coming from a family where reading, writing and speaking is important. Books are available in the family, Lena gets a book from her mother, her questions are answered, she can imitate her brother, her brother explains things to her, and she learns from her family that reading and writing is important and it is worth the effort of learning. Kretschmann, Behring and Dobrindt argue that children like Lena have it more easy at school, than children from families where these things are not present. Often the lessons at school are made for children like Lena, whereas other children are often not included. For these children it is frustrating, to always be confronted with something they do not know or understand. These children develop anxieties, barriers to learning or defensive attitudes.

== Reception ==
Publishers Weekly believed that I Want to Go to School Too gives a reassuring answer to the questions young children have when they start school. In addition, the lively, cheerful illustrations by Ilon Wikland are praised.

Stiftung Lesen thinks the book is a great present for the Schultüte at the children's first day of school.

According to Kirkus Reviews Ilon Wikland's illustrations are more memorable than Astrid Lindgren's text, and also descrided them as entertaining and rich in detail.
