= I Want a Brother or Sister =

Book by Astrid Lindgren

- Author: Astrid Lindgren
- Original title: Jag vill också ha ett syskon
- Illustrator: Ilon Wikland; Birgitta Nordenskjöld
- Language: Swedish
- Publisher: Rabén & Sjögren
- Publication date: 1951
- Publication place: Sweden
- English publication date: 1979

I Want a Brother or Sister, also as That's My Baby (original title: Jag vill också ha ett syskon), is a children's book written by Astrid Lindgren. It is about Peter and his sister Lena, who later appeared in the book I Want to Go to School Too.

== Plot ==
A mother and a father have a baby son and call him Peter. Although the baby boy screams a lot, his parents love him very much and think he is the cutest child in the world. When Peter grows older, he plays with his friend Jan on the street. One day Jan shows Peter his little brother. Peter now wants to have siblings too. He goes to his mother and tells her about it. Peter's mother tells him that he will soon have a brother or sister. When Peter's sister Lena is born, Peter suddenly doesn't want to have a sister anymore. Lena screams constantly and gets a lot more attention than he does. In order to get his mother's attention, Peter does all kinds of nonsense as soon as Peter's mother is paying attention to Lena, so his mother has to pay attention to him.

When Peter cries because he thinks that his parents prefer Lena to him, his mother takes him on his lap and tells him how much she loves him. She explains to him that babies are always a lot of trouble and so was Peter when he was little. She also explains that she got Lena for Peter and that he should take care of her too. He had cried a lot when he was little, so his mother had to take care of him. Peter decides to take care of Lena. He is very proud when he makes her stop crying. He proudly presents his sister to the other children in the playground.

When Peter and Lena are older, his mother has a third child, Mats. Peter and Lena love Mats very much, even though he screams a lot and gets a lot of his parents' attention. Peter is glad that he has got Lena, as the two have a lot of fun together and without Lena Peter would have no one to have a pillow fight with.

== Background ==
I Want a Brother or Sister (Jag vill också ha ett syskon) was first published in 1951 by Rabén & Sjögren and was illustrated by Birgitta Nordenskjöld. In 1978 the new edition of the book was released in Sweden, illustrated by Ilon Wikland. This book was translated into English in 1979. It has been translated into at least 20 different languages.

Astrid Lindgren published two books dealing with the lives of the siblings Peter and Lena. I Want a Brother or Sister is the first book followed by the second one I Want to Go to School Too where Peter brings Lena to school. Mats doesn't appear in this book and Peter's and Lena's mother is only mentioned once, as Lena has a book that she has gotten from her mother.

== Reception ==
Ute Vaut thought that the book is a wonderful picture book in a great atmosphere. It shows that new siblings need to get a lot of attention from the parents, but also that the parents love their older child just as much as before. She recommended the book for children from the age of 4. Alexandra Rausch stated that the book could serve as easy preparation and discussion opportunity, on the basis of which the parents could talk to the older child about these things. Gerald Hüther and Cornelia Nitsch also recommended the story in their book Wie aus Kindern glückliche Erwachsene werden for children aged and above to prepare them for a sibling. Traude Trieb and Doris Becker agreed with this statement. Doris Becker said that Lindgren's picture book lovingly deals with this subject. Ella Berthoud and Susan Elderkin listed the book among the "ten best books when you get new siblings".

Stefan Erlemann from media-mania.de said that the book describes "stereotypical role models and behaviors"; the mother always bathes the children, the father just watches and babies always cry. Erlemannn also did not like the pictures of Ilon Wikland, calling them too colorful, naive and ugly.
