= Seacrow Island =

1964 novel by Astrid Lindgren

- Author: Astrid Lindgren
- Original title: Vi på Saltkråkan
- Illustrator: Ilon Wikland
- Language: Swedish
- Publisher: Rabén & Sjögren
- Publication date: 1964
- Publication place: Sweden
- English publication date: 1968
- Preceded by: Life on Seacrow Island
- Followed by: Scrap and the Pirates

Seacrow Island (original title: Vi på Saltkråkan) is a children's book written by Astrid Lindgren. The story continues in the book Scrap and the Pirates.

== Plot ==
Family Melkersson from Stockholm goes to Seacrow Island to live at Carpenter's Cottage during their summer holidays. Melker, a widowed father of four, has rented the house, without seeing it before. When it starts raining through the roof, the family is a little disappointed but soon begins to love the house by the sea. While the 19-year-old daughter Malin, takes care of the house and goes on dates, her oldest brothers Johan and Niklas befriend with Teddy and Freddy who are living on the Island. Together the friends experience many adventures, such as getting lost in the see, during a foggy day. Teddy's and Freddy's sister Tjorven befriends with Pelle, Melker's youngest son. Tjorven has a giant Bernard, that Pelle likes really much. He is a little jealous that Tjorven has such a great animal. Pelle and Tjorven are often joined by Stina, who visits her grandfather during the holidays. As Pelle loves animals so much Tjorven gets him a rabbit called Jocke that Tjorven takes care of when Pelle is in Stockholm. After several holidays on the island, the Carpenter's Cottage should be sold, by the owner. Family Melkersson is sad as they do not have enough money to buy the house. A rich man wants to demolish their beloved house to build a holiday house on it. When Melker finally acquires a lot of money, for writing a book, the house seems to be sold already by the estate agent. Pelle and Tjorven, however, manage to contact the owner of the house and can convince her to sell the house to Melker. Now the family is able to stay on Seacrow Island whenever they want.

== Characters ==
- Melker Melkersson is a single-father from Stockholm who is almost 50 years old. His wife died when their youngest son Pelle was born. Melker is a little clumsy but loved by all the people on Seacrow Island.
- Malin Melkersson is the 19-year-old daughter of Melker and sister to Johan, Niklas, and Pelle. Since her mother has died when Malin was 12 years old she took care of her brothers and her father. To her brothers, she is like a mother. Malin is pretty and fancied by many guys.
- Pelle Melkersson is seven years old and loves animals. He has a very close relationship with Malin.
- Johan & Niklas Melkersson are the brothers of Malin and Pelle. They always do things together. On Seacrow Island they befriend with Teddy and Freddy and have many adventures with them.
- Tjorven Grankvist is six years old and lives on Seacrow Island with her parents, her dog, and her two sisters. She is a loveable mischief, good natured and straightforward, and often encourages her somewhat more reserved friend Pelle to look for adventures with her. At the end of the book, she convinces him to find the elderly owner of the Carpenter's Cottage and "buy" the house from her for the Melkerssons, giving her one Swedish crown deposit.
- Bosun is a two-year-old giant Bernard and belongs to Tjorven.
- Nisse Grankvist is the island's shopkeeper and father of Tjorven.
- Marta Grankvist is the mother of Tjorven.
- Teddy (Teodora) & Freddy (Frederika) Grankvist are the sisters of Tjorven. They grew up on Seacrow Island and know the Island and its surroundings very well. When Johan and Niklas go to Seacrow Island on their holidays they always spent time with them. Teddy is thirteen and Freddy twelve years old.
- Stina is at most five years old. She often visits her grandfather Söderman on Seacrow Island and loves to tell fairy tales and stories.
- Söderman is the grandfather of Stina and lives on Seacrow Island
- Westerman is living on Seacrow Island. He is always in need for money.
- Krister is a guy who falls in love with Malin, but the dates of Malin and Krister are always disturbed by Malin's brothers and eventually they stop dating.
- Björn Sjöblom is a teacher. He teaches the children of Seacrow Island on an Island close by, where he also lives. He falls in love with Malin who does not love him back. So eventually he gets engaged with another woman.
- Peter Malm is a scientist who comes to Seacrow Island. He is the first guy Malin really falls in love with. Eventually, the couple marries.

== Background ==
The book is based on the TV series Life on Seacrow Island (in Swedish: Vi på Saltkråkan) and the film Tjorven, Båtsman och Moses. While the book has been translated into English, the TV series and film have not. Seacrow Island is the biggest novel that Astrid Lindgren wrote, containing 360 pages.

The story takes place on the fictional holiday island Seacrow Island which doesn't really exist, but some real places are mentioned in the book, including Söderöra, Furusund and Rödlöga. Thus, Seacrow Island is located on the northern Stockholm Archipelago. Astrid Lindgren and her family often spent their summers on the Island Furusund at the Stockholm archipelago. Many of Astrid Lindgren's books were written there. After thirty summer holidays at the Stockholm archipelago, Lindgren started to write Vi på Saltkråkan which takes place on a fictional island over there.

Saltkråkan (the Swedish name for Seacrow Island) is named after a sailing boat of the Lindgren family in Furusund. Astrid Lindgren bought this boat from Hans Rabén.

== Reception ==
April Bernard from The New York Review of Books believed that the book is "an idyll about a family and a village". She has been enchanted by the beautiful book and said that it is suitable for children and for adults.

According to International Board on Books for Young People, International Institute for Children's Literature and Reading Research and International Institute for Children's, Juvenile, and Popular Literature, the book is similar to those based on The Six Bullerby Children, but Astrid Lindgren gave the children "new surroundings and also developed them into independent children with a great love for animals and nature".
