= Most Beloved Sister =

1949 book by Astrid Lindgren

- First standalone edition (1973)
- Author: Astrid Lindgren
- Working title: Allrakäraste syster
- Cover artist: Hans Arnold
- Language: Swedish
- Published: 1949; 1973 (standalone edition)
- Publisher: Rabén & Sjögren
- Publication place: Sweden

Most Beloved Sister (Swedish: Allrakäraste syster) is a 1949 children's book by the Swedish author Astrid Lindgren. It was originally included in the collection Nils Karlsson Pyssling (OCLC 185229564), then re-released in 1973 with illustrations by Hans Arnold.

== Plot ==
The story revolves around seven-year-old Barbro, who has a secret twin sister called Ylva-li, who after birth, immediately ran away and hid under a rose bush in the garden. Ylva-li is the only person in Barbro's life who likes her more than anything else, and who calls her Most Beloved Sister. Barbro visits her sister by crawling down a hole under a rose bush in the garden, that the sisters call Salikon. Under Salikon lies a golden hall in a magical land where Ylva-li is queen. There, Barbro and Ylva-Li are friends with all sorts of creatures and animals, and each have their own dogs, two black poodles called Ruff and Duff. On the day the story takes place, the two sisters decide to go on a long adventure on horseback. They travel though a dark, looming forest, and eat eat candy and pancakes on a magical field. Lastly, they go a valley, where no one else can go but them. There, Ylva-li tells Barbro that she will die together with the bush above when Salikons roses wither. When Barbro comes home her mother surprises her with a puppy, a black poodle, named Ruff. The next day when Barbro goes to visit her sister under Salikon, the roses on the rose bush are dead, and there is no longer a hole in the ground.

== Overview ==
Most Beloved Sister was first published in 1949 in the Swedish magazine Vi. The book was illustrated by Eva Billow. In 1949 it was published in the fairy tale collection Nils Karlsson Pyssling. In 1950 Astrid Lindgren was awarded the Nils Holgersson Plaque for this book.

== Film ==
A short-film, directed by Göran Carmback, based on the book, was made in 1988.
