= Vladimir Oravsky =

Swedish writer and film director

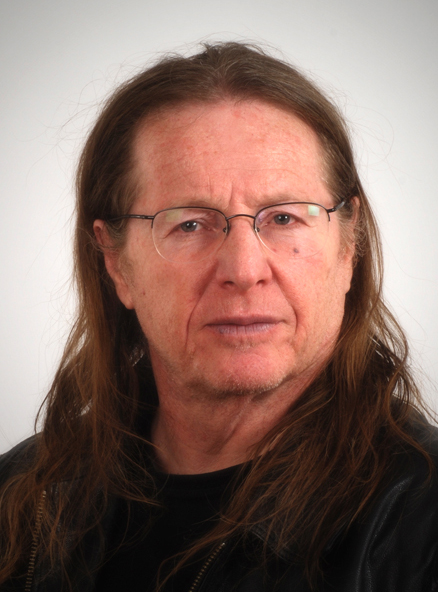
- Oravsky in 2013
- Born: 22 January 1947 (age 79); Rožňava, Czechoslovakia
- Occupations: Film director; author
- Years active: 1971–present
- Children: 2

Vladimir Oravsky (born 22 January 1947) is a Slovak-born Swedish author and film director.

Oravsky is published by many publishing houses, as Studentlitteratur, h:ström – Text & Kultur, Nya Doxa, Symposion, Raketförlaget, Lundtofte Publishing, De Rode Kamer and Branner og Koch. Oravsky has published books for children and youth, commissioned plays and screenplays. As his favorite model George S Kaufman, Oravsky works often in collaboration with writing partners, among them Kurt Peter Larsen, Daniel Malmen, Michael Segerström, Lars von Trier, Jakob Stegelman, and Natasa Durovicova.

Vladimir Oravsky and Kurt Peter Larsen are joint winners of 2006 International award for best play for children, organized by International Playwrights’ Forum, International Theatre Institute/ ITI and ASSITEJ (International Association of Theatre for Children and Young People), for their contribution “AAAHR!!!”

“The Diary of Zlata Ibrahimivic” by Oravsky & Malmen was one of winning plays in competition, organized by Royal Drama Theatre / Elverket in Stockholm.

== Books on film ==
- 1983 - Film 1983 : årets bedste (Film 1983, the best of), co-author: J Stegelmann. ISBN 87-562-2524-5.
- 1984 - Film 1984 : film årbogen 1984 (Film Year book 1984), co-author: J Stegelmann. ISBN 87-562-2829-5.
- 1984 - I skuggornas hetta (In the Heat of Shadows), co-author: Olle Ekstrand, N Durovicova, Kerstin Sandström. ISBN 91-44-21371-9.
- 1985 - Ånden i biostaden (Soul of the Cinema), co-author: O Ekstrand, N Durovicova, Sven-Erik Svensson. ISBN 87-88261-10-7.

== Books for children and youth ==
- 1988 - Öya, en flicka liten som ett busfrö (Öya, a Little Girl Devil), co-author: Elsa Thern. ISBN 91-970636-4-9.
- 1989 - Öya växer till sig, (Öya Grows up), co-author: E Thern. ISBN 91-970636-8-1.
- 1989 - Herman och Tusse (Herman and Tofsy), co-author: K P Larsen. ISBN 91-970636-4-9.
- 1989 - Herman och stjärnorna (Herman and the Stars), co-author: K P Larsen. ISBN 91-970636-6-5.
- 1989 - Harry - en bussig buss (Harry, a Kind Bus), co-author: K P Larsen. ISBN 91-7868-171-5.
- 2004 - Dumma byxa ut och gå när man nappar på en tå (Out, Silly Trousers!), ISBN 91-7694-687-8.

== Refugee trilogy ==
- 2004 - Zlata Ibrahimovics dagbok (The Diary of Zlata Ibrahimovic), co-author: D Malmén. ISBN 91-89447-23-9.
- 2007 - Det rena landet : en berättelse om våldtäkt (The Immaculate Country : a Rape Story), co-author: D Malmén. ISBN 91-7327-012-1.
- 2007 - På väg : Berättelser av Zlata Ibrahimovic (On the Way: Stories by Zlata Ibrahimovic), ISBN 91-7327-016-4.

== The Sweden-pentalogy ==
- 2000 - Den lyckliga ockupationen (The Happy Occupation), ISBN 91-578-0357-9
- 2002 - Lathund för ambitiösa katter. Del 1 : Metamorfoser enligt Ovidius, Kafka och Oravsky (Lazy dog for ambitious cats. Part 1 : Metamorphoses according to Ovid, Kafka and Oravsky), ISBN 91-89447-07-7
- 2002 - Kulturen bakom kulturen (The Culture Behind the Culture), ISBN 91-89447-13-1
- 2002 - Lathund för ambitiösa katter. Del 2 : Rhapsody in blue and yellow för blågula och rödgröna katters ett till flera in- och utandningsorgan (Lazy dog for ambitious cats. Part 2 : Rhapsody in blue and yellow for the several breathing organs of blueyellow and redgreen cats), ISBN 91-89447-08-5
- 2007 - Friheten i kulturen : Reflexioner kring tystnad och repression inom kulturetablissemanget (Liberty within the culture : Thoughts on silence and repression within the cultural establishment) ISBN 978-91-7327-044-1

== Novels ==
- 2006 - Van Astrid tot Lindgren (From Astrid to Lindgren), co-author: K.P. Larsen. ISBN 90-78124-01-6
- 2007 - Axel och Toine (Axel and Toine)co-author: K.P. Larsen. ISBN 91-976026-3-9
- 2007 - Från Astrid till Lindgren (From Astrid to Lindgren) co-author: K.P. Larsen & Anonymous. ISBN 978-91-7327-003-8

== Plays (published) ==
- - 2006 Flykten under jorden jämte flera gruvsamma och nöjsamma tragedier och komedier (The Underground Escape and Other Underhanded and Undermining Tragedies and Comedies). This volume consists of the following plays: Flykten under jorden (Escape Underground), Zlata Ibrahimovics dagbok (Diary of Zlata Ibrahimovic), Fioler, fikon och förebud (Fiddles, figs and fortitude),(Danish version: Blomkål og violinbuer = Cauliflower and fiddlesticks), Spartakus uppäten (Spartacus Devoured), (Danish version: Spartakus spist) and SKUM. co-author: K.P. Larsen & D. Malmén. ISBN 91-89447-66-2
- - 2006 ÄÄÄHR!!! (AAAHR!!!), (English language version), co-author: K.P. Larsen ISBN 91-89447-95-6
