= Mästerdetektiven Blomkvist på nya äventyr =

1966 film by Etienne Glaser

- Directed by: Etienne Glaser
- Screenplay by: Astrid Lindgren
- Based on: Kalle Blomkvist, Nisse Nöjd och Vicke på Vind by Astrid Lindgren
- Produced by: Bo Billtén
- Music by: Sten Carlberg
- Release date: 1966
- Running time: 66 minutes
- Country: Sweden
- Language: Swedish

Mästerdetektiven Blomkvist på nya äventyr is a 1966 Swedish film about Kalle Blomkvist, directed by Etienne Glaser and written by Astrid Lindgren. It is based on the play Kalle Blomkvist, Nisse Nöjd och Vicke på Vind.

== Plot ==
The White Rose (Kalle, Anders, Eva-Lotta) and the Red Rose (Sixten, Benka, Jonte) are fighting for a magical stone, called the Stormumriken.

One day Kalle and Sixten test their strengths and fight against each other, while Anders, Eva-Lotta, Benka and Jonte are watching and cheering. Policeman Rudolf Rask comes by and interrupts the fight. He tells the teenagers to stop fighting and the friends disappear.

Later, Rask talks to Kalle's rich aunts Hilda and Hulda Krikonblad. He promises to make sure the sisters are safe.

When the sisters are looking at a shop window, Kalle pranks them by knotting their ropes together. Hulda laughs when she realizes what the teenagers have done. Hilda however reacts differently, and she calls for the police officer Rask. After unsuccessfully trying to catch Kalle, Rask brings Hilda back home.

A short time later, the musicians Vicke and Nisse sing in front of the house of the sisters. Nisse plays the guitar while Vicke plays the accordion. Hulda wants to give some money to the musicians, but Hilda is annoyed by the sound of the music. She yells at Vicke and Nisse and tells them to stop immediately. The White Rose and the Red Rose observe the whole thing and laugh with the musicians about Hilda's behavior. Then the teenagers say goodbye.

The musicians however are out of money, and they do not know where to get any new money. Then Nisse has an idea: he wants to kidnap Hulda and extort a lot of money for her release, which is supposed to happen that night.

The two musicians sneak into the apartment of the sisters and break in, but instead of kidnapping the kind Hulda they kidnap the tough Hilda. They wrap her into a blanket and carry her out, but they are observed by Kalle. The next day not only Hilda is gone, but Kalle is missing as well.

Hulda receives a blackmailer letter. She is asked to pay a lot for the release of her sister. She reads the letter to the White and Red Rose. The teenagers try to help Hulda with their own pocket money.

Meanwhile, Hilda and Kalle are locked up in a small house by the criminals. While Kalle writes into his notebook, Hilda is angry, throws the dishes on the floor and complains. The criminals are annoyed by her complaining.

The criminals are discovered by Hulda, when they try to get the ransom. Hulda tries to alarm the White and Red Rose, but instead the policeman Rudolf Rask comes and talks to the criminals. To distract the policeman, the criminals make music with him. Then they say goodbye and go back to the house where they keep Kalle and Hilda prisoner, but Kalle and Hilda have already planned how they can overpower the two criminals and Rudolf Rask can later imprison them.

== Cast ==
- Rolf Lindefors: Kalle Blomkvist
- Casper Verner-Carlson: Anders Bengtsson
- Nora Birch-Jensen: Eva-Lotta Lisander
- Matti Verner-Carlsson: Sixten
- Hans Johansson: Benka
- Peter Ström: Jonte
- Olof Thunberg: Polis Rudolf Rask
- Isa Quensel: Hilda Krikonblad
- Alice Eklund: Hulda Krikonblad
- Lars Edström: Vicke på vind
- Mille Schmidt: Nisse Nöjd

== Background ==
The film is based on the theater play Kalle Blomkvist, Nisse Nöjd och Vicke på Vind which was written by Astrid Lindgren in 1950. The play was published in a book with a collection of several theater plays, called Sex pjäser för barn och ungdom. In the film Astrid Lindgren's young detective Kalle Blomkvist solves a crime along with his friends from the White and the Red Rose. The film was first broadcast in 1966 on Sveriges Television. It was recorded on 26 December and was later released on video. Later the play was performed on Swedish theater stages, with different titles like Kalle Blomqvist, Nisse Nöjd och Vicke på Vind, Som dom gör i Amerika (short version in one act) or Mästerdetektiven Blomqvist.
