= The Dragon with Red Eyes =

1985 book by Astrid Lindgren

- Author: Astrid Lindgren
- Original title: Draken med de röda ögonen
- Illustrator: Ilon Wikland
- Language: Swedish
- Publisher: Rabén & Sjögren
- Publication date: 1985
- Publication place: Sweden
- English publication date: 1986

The Dragon with Red Eyes (original title: Draken med de röda ögonen) is a children's book written by Astrid Lindgren.

== Plot ==
A brother and sister go into the pigsty to look at the little piglets that were born during the night. In the barn they do not only see the piglets, but also a small green dragon with red eyes. Since the dragon always bites his pig mother while drinking, she eventually gives him nothing. Therefore, the siblings raise the dragon. In autumn, the little dragon says goodbye to the siblings and flies into the middle of the sunset. He sings happily with a clear, bright voice.

== Background ==
In December 1953, Astrid Lindgren received a letter from two thirteen-year-old boys. They asked if she could write a little story about a dragon for their magazine Maskrerade draken (English: The Masked Dragon). Astrid Lindgren wrote The Dragon with Red Eyes and sent the story to the two boys.

In 1985 the story was published as a picture book by Rabén & Sjögren with illustrations by Ilon Wikland. Furthermore a set of three stamps with Ilon Wikland's illustration of the dragon were released in Sweden. The English edition was published in 1986.

In 2013 a theatre play of the book was created in Germany. The theatre play was 40 minutes long and directed by Margrit Gysin.

== Analysis ==
Louise D'Arcens and Andrew Lynch believe that the story of Astrid Lindgren deals with the loss of childhood. Because of that the story is told from an adult's perspective. The adult remembered the time when she was a child. There is no adult figure in the story of her childhood. One day the dragon says goodbye. The adults remember that she only cried that day and couldn't read any story in the evening. With the following quote, the adults remembers the end of her childhood: "On the 2nd of October every year I think of my childhood dragon. For it was on a second October that he disappeared".

The feeling of loss caused by the farewell and departure of the dragon put an end to the joys of imagination and lead to a disenchanted world that leaves no room for dragons, so that only the memory remains. Thus, the loss of childhood is mourned, which is represented by a division between past and future, premodern and modern, child and adult.

According to Gabriele Cromme the book shows that feminine loving care and empathy also includes to be able to let go.

== Reception ==
Mirjam Zimmermann and Christian Butt believe it is a great book to be used for lessons in school. Teachers could use it to speak with the children about grief and taking the leave of someone or something.
