= Kurt Peter Larsen =

Danish writer

Kurt Peter Larsen is a Danish author. Born 27 May 1953 in Denmark, he is the Danish half of the writing duo Oravsky/Larsen and writes in Danish, Swedish, English and German. Kurt Peter Larsen and Vladimir Oravsky won the 2006 worldwide drama competition sponsored by The International Playwrights’ Forum, The International Theatre Institute (ITI) and The International Association of Theatre for Children and Young People (ASSITEJ) with their play ”AAAHR!!!”.

== Select bibliography ==
- 1989 - Herman och Tusse (Herman and Tofsy), co-author: V. Oravsky. ISBN 91-970636-4-9.
- 1989 - Herman och stjärnorna (Herman and the Stars), co-author: V. Oravsky. ISBN 91-970636-6-5.
- 1989 - Harry - en bussig buss (Harry, a Kind Bus), co-author: V. Oravsky. ISBN 91-7868-171-5.
- 2006 - Van Astrid tot Lindgren (From Astrid to Lindgren), co-author: V. Oravsky ISBN 90-78124-01-6.
- 2006 - Flykten under jorden jämte flera gruvsamma och nöjsamma tragedier och komedier (The Underground Escape and Other Underhanded and Undermining Tragedies and Comedies), co-author: V. Oravsky och Daniel Malmén. ISBN 91-89447-66-2.
- 2006 - ÄÄÄHR!!! (Aaahr!!!), co-author: V. Oravsky. ISBN 978-91-89447-95-0.
- 2007 - Axel och Toine (Axel and Toine), co-author: V. Oravsky, et al. ISBN 91-976026-3-9.
- 2007 - Från Astrid till Lindgren (From Astrid to Lindgren), co-author: V. Oravsky & Anonymous. ISBN 978-91-7327-003-8.

== Translations ==
- 1993 - Sneglefart - og andre (Snailspeed and others), written by V. Oravsky.ISBN 87-87734-37-0.

== Selected Drama ==
- 1997 - Faust för tiden (Faust forever), (Danish, Swedish), co-author: V. Oravsky.
- 2002 - Astri mi! The Musical, (English), co-author: V Oravsky.
- 2005 - Spartacus uppäten (Spartacus devoured), (Danish, Swedish), co-author: V. Oravsky.
- 2006 - Antoinette, (English, Danish, Swedish), co-author: V. Oravsky.
- 2006 - AAAHR!!! (English, Danish, Swedish), co-author: V. Oravsky.
- 2007 - En svensk tiger, Tiger Woods! (A Swede Is Silent, Tiger Woods), (Danish, Swedish), co-author: V. Oravsky.
- 2007 - The Rocky Horror Prostata Show, Danish, Swedish), co-author: V. Oravsky.
- 2007 - Astri mi! Pjäsen (Astri-mi! The Play) (English, Danish, Swedish), co-author: V. Oravsky.
