= Rödlöga =

Cluster of islets in Sweden

Coordinates: 59°35′30″N 19°10′0″E

Rödlöga is a cluster of islets outside in the Stockholm archipelago. The main island had been permanently inhabited since the 18th century into the 1970s when its last permanent resident, George Nordström, died. Rödlöga is today a spot for boating vacation. Location shooting took place for the 1938 film Storm Over the Skerries.

== Gallery ==
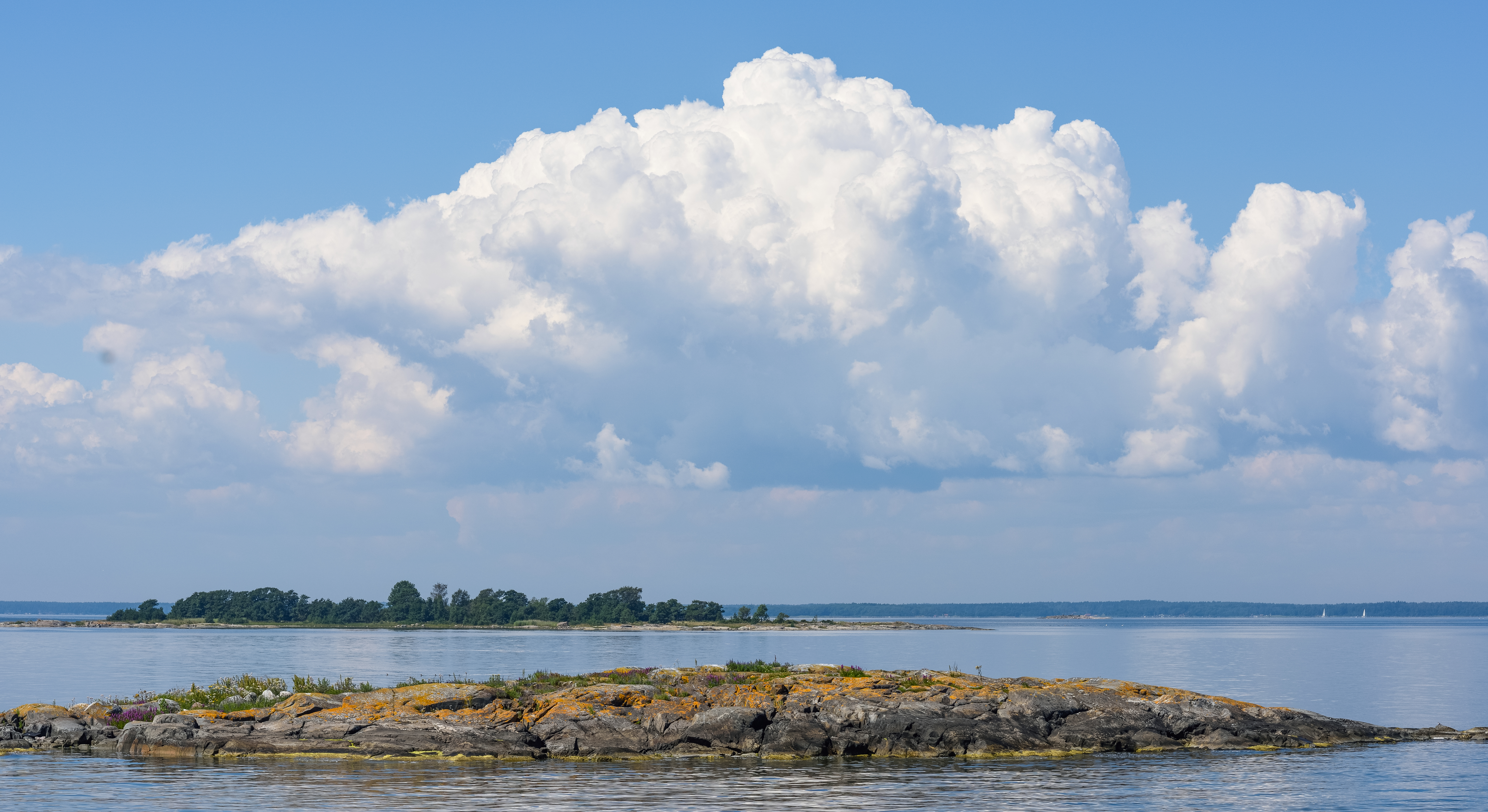
Rödlöga July 2014

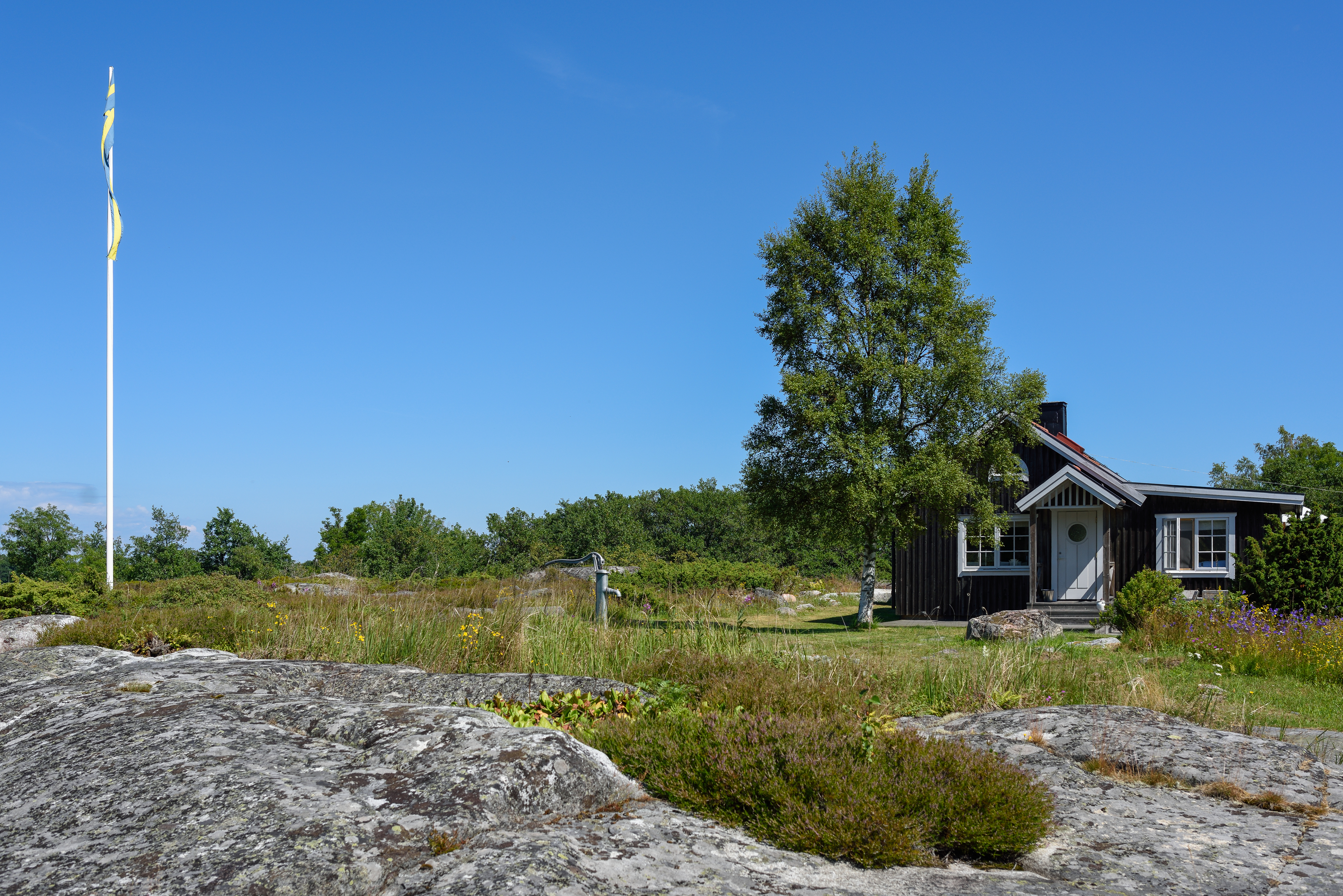
Rödlöga July 2014

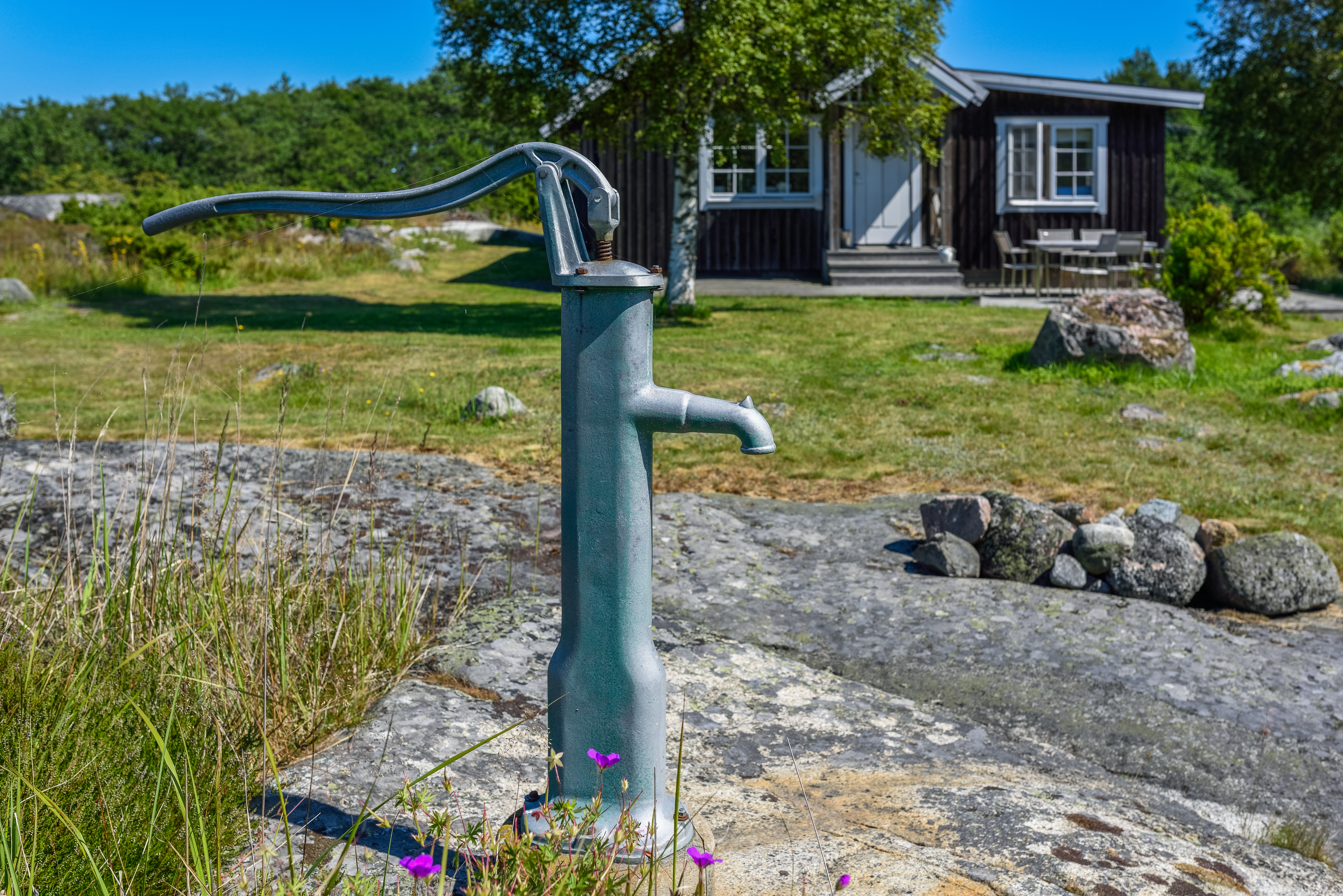
Rödlöga July 2014

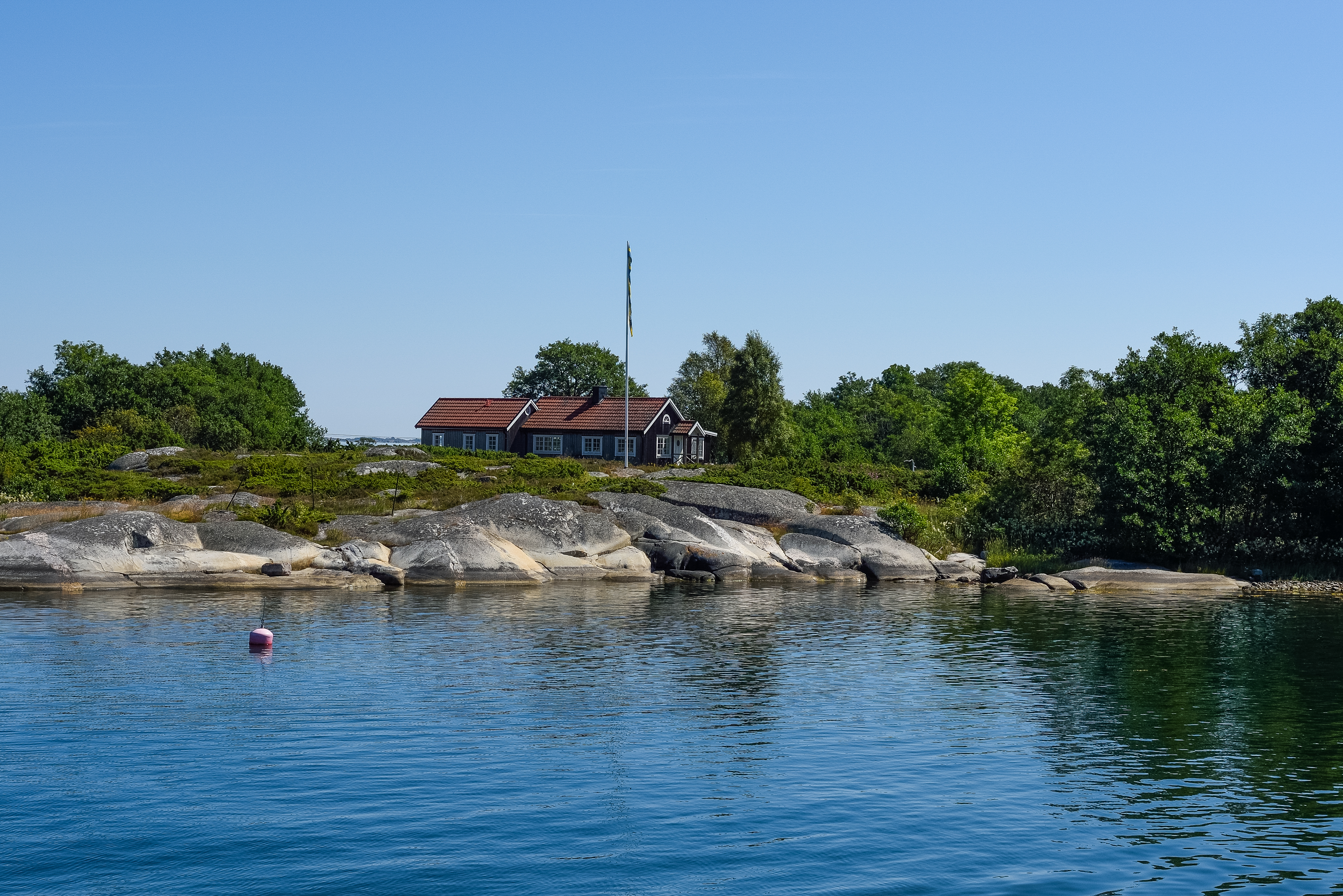
Rödlöga July 2014
