= I Don't Want to Go to Bed (book) =

1947 book by Astrid Lindgren

- First edition (Swedish)
- Author: Astrid Lindgren
- Original title: Jag vill inte gå och lägga mig!
- Illustrator: Ilon Wikland
- Language: Swedish
- Publisher: Rabén & Sjögren
- Publication date: 1947
- Publication place: Sweden
- English publication date: 1988

I Don't Want to Go to Bed (original title: Jag vill inte gå och lägga mig!) is a children's book written by Astrid Lindgren.

== Plot ==
Lasse doesn't want to go to bed and he always finds new things to play with. His mother doesn't know what to do. Therefore, Aunt Lotte lets Lasse put on her magic glasses. With the glasses, Lasse observes what the other children are doing.

Lasse sees a baby bear sitting in bed after a long day in the forest eating his honey porridge. In the children's room, the rabbit children go to bed after a pillow fight. Five little bird children sleep on the trees after practicing flying in the afternoon. Three squirrel children play with a toy train, eat candy and go to bed. Meanwhile, mouse child Kasper comes home late after playing in the yard. His mother explains that he should quickly have dinner and then go to bed because his siblings are all already asleep.

After Lasse took off the glasses, Aunt Lotte explained that he had seen that all children have to sleep in the evening. Therefore, Lasse should go to bed too. Lasse goes home and goes to bed very quietly. When his mother wants to bring him to bed, he is already asleep.

== Background ==
Jag vill inte gå och lägga mig! was published in 1947 in Sweden. The first edition was illustrated by Brigitta Nordenskjöld. An illustrated reprint with pictures from Ilon Wikland was published in 1988. Wikland drew Aunt Lotte like Astrid Lindgren.

== Reception ==
According to Susanne Barth the book contains traditional role clichés. She criticized that in the book only mothers are made responsible for getting their troubled children to bed. Cromme added that even though there are only mothers who bring their children to bed, there is a girl who is faster than her brothers and behaves smartly and confidently.

Maria Nikolajeva and Carole Scott said that the illustrations by Nordenskjöld and Wikland give totally different impressions of the books, but are both rich in detail.

Sabine Mosch said that Astrid Lindgren wrote with a lot of heart and understanding for the children and also for the annoyed parents.

Readingastrid called the book "pretty darn adorable".
