= Brenda Brave Helps Grandmother =

1950 book by Astrid Lindgren

- Author: Astrid Lindgren
- Original title: Kajsa Kavat
- Illustrator: Ingrid Vang Nyman
- Language: Swedish
- Publisher: Rabén & Sjögren
- Publication date: 1949 (in magazine); 1950 (in book)

Brenda Brave Helps Grandmother (original title: Kajsa Kavat) is a 1950 story by Astrid Lindgren about a young girl named Brenda (Kajsa) in Sweden. The book about the character has been translated into many different languages.

== Plot ==
As a baby, Brenda is put onto the doorstep of a woman, that she later calls grandmother. Her grandmother takes care of her until she breaks her leg. Then Brenda suddenly is the one to take care of her grandmother. She goes to the market and sells the bonbons that her grandmother made and cleans the house. As Brenda has helped out so well, she gets the doll for Christmas that she had always wished for.

== Background ==
The story was first published in 1949 in the Swedish magazine Vi, illustrated by Ingrid Vang Nyman. In 1950 it was included in a novel collection called Kajsa Kavat. Later it was published as a picture book on its own, illustrated by Ilon Wikland. It was translated into many languages, among them English and German. While the Swedish name of the girl is Kajsa Kavat, she has a different name in other countries: Brenda Brave (English), Greta Grintosa (Italian) and Polly Patent (German).

In Germany the book was also edited into a theatre play, which was shown in the theatre of Gütersloh. One of the attractions of Astrid Lindgren's World also deals with Brenda Brave and her story.

== Film ==
In 1989 a short film called Brenda Brave was made, which tells Brenda's story, and was directed by Daniel Bergman.

== See also ==
- List of Christmas-themed literature
