= Karlsson-on-the-Roof =

Fictional character

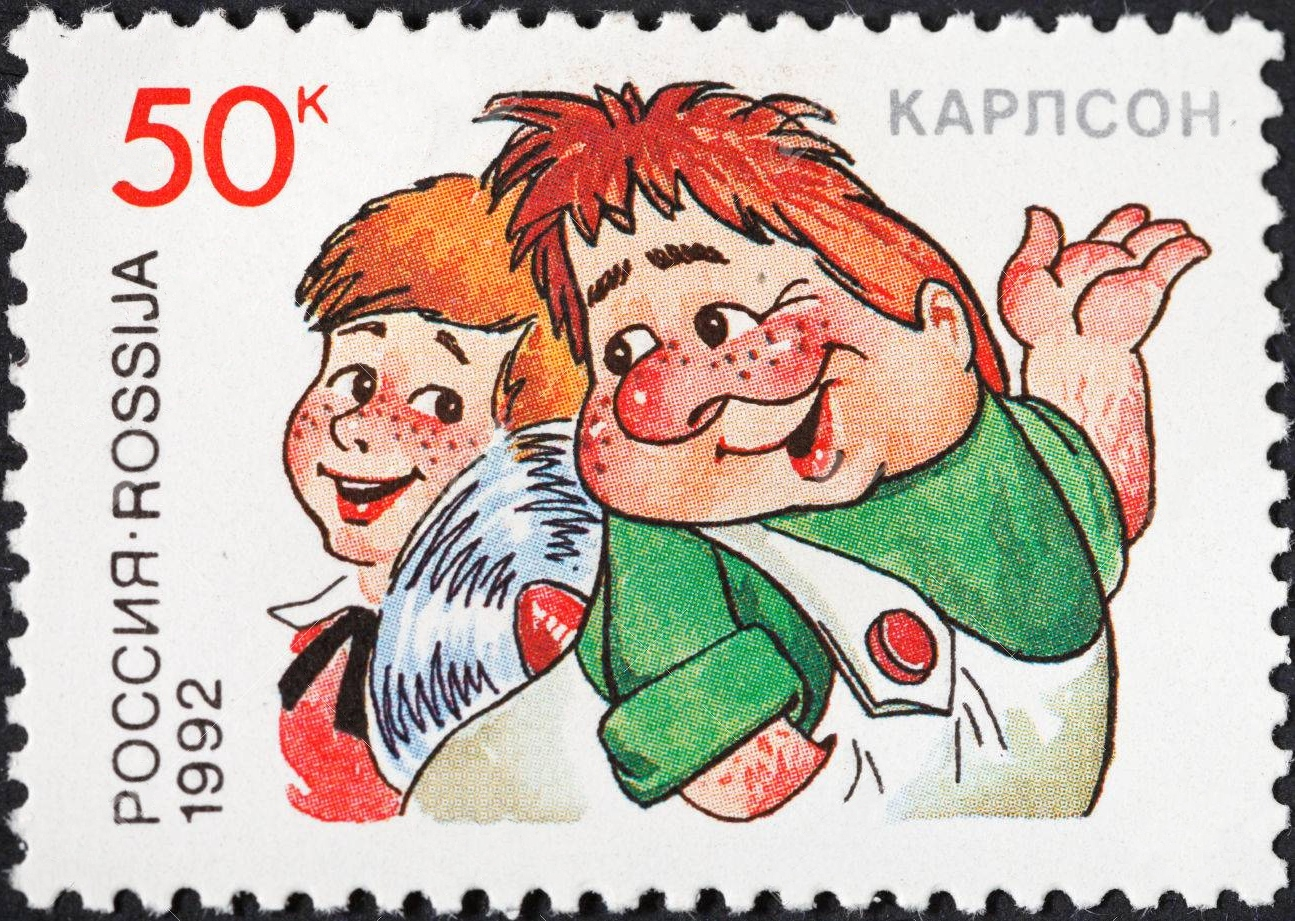
- Karlsson with Svante "Lillebror" (little brother) Svanteson on a Russian stamp (1992).
- Karlsson-on-the-Roof; Karlsson Flies Again; Karlsson-on-the-Roof is Sneaking Around Again
- Author: Astrid Lindgren
- Original title: Karlsson på taket
- Country: Sweden
- Language: Swedish
- Media type: Print (hardcover and paperback)

Karlsson-on-the-Roof (Swedish: Karlsson på taket) is a character who features in a series of children's books by the Swedish author Astrid Lindgren. Lindgren may have borrowed the idea for the series from a similar story about Mr. O'Malley in the comic strip Barnaby (1942) by Crockett Johnson.

== Plot ==
Karlsson is a very short, plump, and overconfident man who lives in a small house hidden behind a chimney on the roof of "a very ordinary apartment building on a very ordinary street" in Vasastan, Stockholm. When Karlsson pushes a button on his stomach, it starts a clever little engine with a propeller on his back, allowing him to fly.

In his own opinion, Karlsson is the best at everything. He befriends Svante Svantesson, a seven-year-old boy and youngest member of the Svantesson family, who is often referred to as "Little Brother", Swedish: Lillebror.

Karlsson is quite mischievous and likes to make fun and prank others. He often gets Lillebror into trouble, as Karlsson usually disappears just before Lillebror's family arrives leaving him to deal with the consequences of Karlsson's actions.

At first, parents, siblings and friends of Lillebror don't believe that Karlsson is real, and consider him to be an imaginary friend, but after they meet him in person they begin to like the little flying man.

Another character to encounter Karlsson is Fröken Bock (Miss Hildur Bock), a strict nanny who undergoes an emotional transformation after meeting Karlsson.

== Development ==
Karlsson's predecessor is Mr. Lilyvale (Swedish: Herr Liljonkvast). Mr. Lilyvale was a small, flying, friendly old man, and fantasy friend of Lindgren's daughter Karin. In the evening he visited her in her room. Lindgren's daughter explained that Mr. Lilyvale could not be seen by anyone else because he flew away or hid as soon as someone entered the room. Astrid Lindgren wrote the book In the Land of Twilight about Mr. Lilyvale. At that time, Mr. Lilyvale was friendlier, less selfish, bossy or self-centered. He also had no propeller. According to Astrid Lindgren, Mr. Lilyvale later turned into Karlsson.

== Characters ==
The characters' names are often changed in English-language translations:

- Karlsson - Karlsson or Karlson
- Svante - Eric, Sandy
- Svanteson, Svante's last name - Sanderson
- Lillebror, Svante's nickname - Midge, Smidge
- Bosse, Lillebror's older brother - Sebastian (Bass), Bobby
- Bettan, Lillebror's older sister - Barbara (Barbie), Betty
- Krister, Lillebror's classmate - Chris
- Gunilla, Lillebror's classmate - Bridget, Susanna
- Fille, a petty thief - Filly
- Rulle, a petty thief - Rolly
- Fröken Bock, the housemaid - Miss Black, Miss Crawley
- Bimbo, Lillebror's dog - Bumble

== Series and English translations ==
There are three Karlsson-on-the-Roof books:

- 1955: Lillebror och Karlsson på taket
  - Eric and Karlsson-on-the-Roof, translated by Marianne Turner, illustrated by Richard Kennedy, published by Oxford University Press (1958). Characters' name changes: Svante - Eric, Bosse - Bobby, Bettan - Betty.
  - Karlsson-on-the-Roof (ISBN 9780670411771), translated by Marianne Turner, illustrated by Jan Pyk, published by Viking Books for Young Readers (1971).
  - Karlson on the Roof, translated by Patricia Crampton, illustrated by Ilon Wikland, published by Methuen children's books, London (1975). Note to reader: "In an earlier translation the names of some of the characters appeared differently. This completely new and modern translation, while altering a few details, remains faithful to the original". Characters' name changes: Karlsson - Karlson, Lillebror - Midge, Svanteson - Sanderson, Svante - Sandy, Bosse - Sebastian (Bass), Bettan - Barbara (Barbie), Krister - Chris, Gunilla - Susanna, Fille - Filly, Rulle - Rolly, fröken Bock - Miss Black.
  - Karlsson on the Roof, translated by Sarah Death. Characters' name changes: Lillebror - Smidge.
    - (ISBN 9780192727725), illustrated by Tony Ross, published by Oxford University Press (2008). Characters' name changes: Lillebror - Smidge, Bosse - Seb, Bettan - Sally, Bimbo - Bumble, fröken Bock - Miss Crawley.
    - (ISBN 9780192776273), illustrated by Mini Grey, published by Oxford University Press (2021).
- 1962: Karlsson på taket flyger igen
  - Karlsson-on-the-Run (ISBN 9780670411764), translated by Marianne Turner, illustrated by Jan Pyk, published by Viking Books for Young Readers (1971).
  - Karlsson Flies Again (ISBN 9780416583908), translated by Patricia Crampton, illustrated by Ilon Wikland, published by Methuen children's books, London (1977).
  - Karlsson Flies Again, translated by Sarah Death.
    - (ISBN 9780192727749), illustrated by Tony Ross, published by Oxford University Press (2009).
    - (ISBN 9780192776266), illustrated by Mini Grey, published by Oxford University Press (2021).
- 1968: Karlsson på taket smyger igen
  - Karlsson-on-the-Roof is Sneaking Around Again
  - The World's Best Karlsson (ISBN 9780416880205), translated by Patricia Crampton, illustrated by Ilon Wikland, published by Methuen young books (1980).
  - The World's Best Karlsson (ISBN 9780192776358), translated by Sarah Death, illustrated by Mini Grey, published by Oxford University Press (2021).

== Cultural impact and adaptations ==
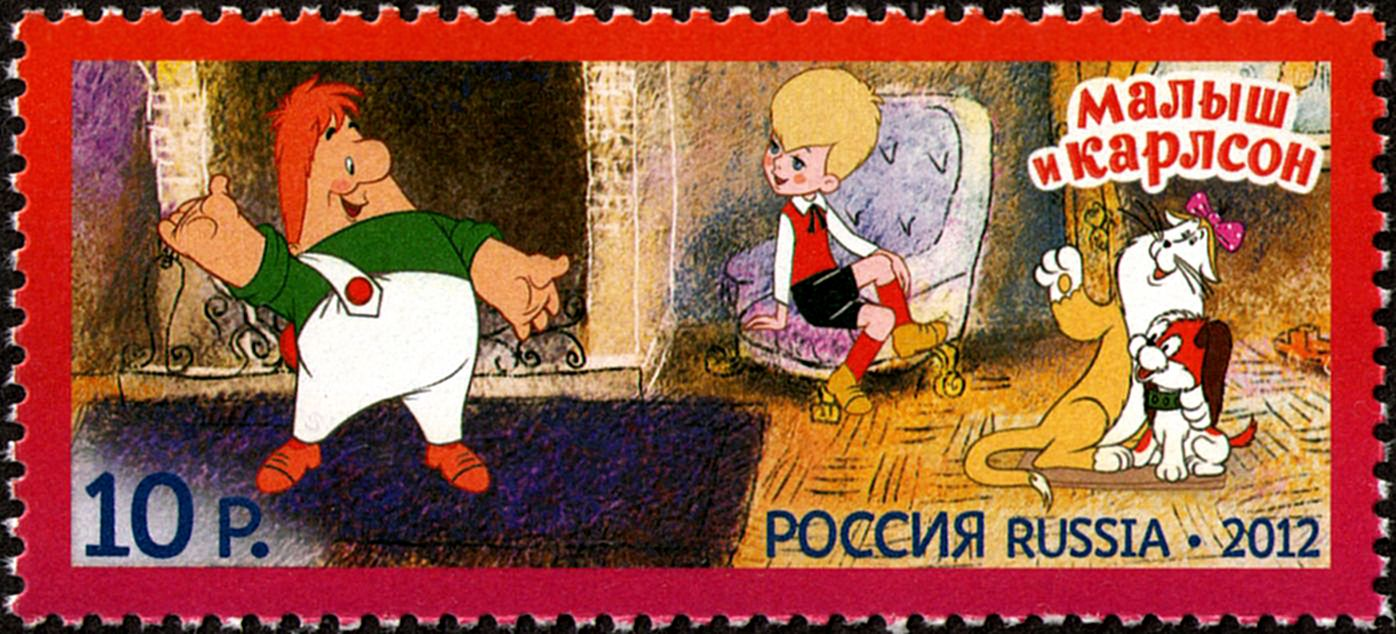
The characters from the Soviet animated film directed by Boris Stepantsev depicted on a Russian stamp, 2012.

Translated books and an animated adaptation of the series became popular in the Soviet Union. "Lillebror" has been changed to (Russian: Малыш, romanized: Malysh), which means "Junior" or "Little boy". Other characters' names have not been changed.

The two Soviet animated films Junior and Karlson (1968) and Karlson Returns (1970), directed by Boris Stepantsev at Soyuzmultfilm studio are among the most celebrated and loved cartoons in Russia and other formerly Soviet countries. Karlsson was voiced by Vasily Livanov and Junior by Klara Rumyanova in both animated films, while Fröken Bock was voiced by Faina Ranevskaya in the second film. In 1971, the character was also adapted for the stage at the Moscow Satire Theatre, where Karlsson was portrayed by Spartak Mishulin.

A live-action version, Världens bästa Karlsson, was released in Sweden in 1974, as was an animated film in 2002.

A Ukrainian military unit during the Russian invasion of Ukraine named itself after Karlsson-on-the-Roof and took the name "Karlsson-on-the-Roof Battalion".
