= Rasmus and the Vagabond =

1956 novel by Astrid Lindgren

- Author: Astrid Lindgren
- Original title: Rasmus på luffen
- Language: Swedish
- Publisher: Rabén & Sjögren
- Publication date: 1956
- Publication place: Sweden
- English publication date: 1960

Rasmus and the Vagabond, also Rasmus and the Hobo (original title: Rasmus på luffen) is a children's book written by Astrid Lindgren.

== Plot ==
Rasmus is living in an orphanage. He wants to be adopted and find a family, but he realizes that only girls seem to get adopted, so he tries to take matters in his own hands. He decides to leave the orphanage and find a family himself. On his way he meets the homeless man Oscar. Oscar and Rasmus travel together to the country and collect money by playing music. One day a robbery takes place at a house Oscar and Rasmus are playing music. The police later believes Oscar is responsible for the robbery, but with the help of Oscar and Rasmus the police finally manages to catch the real robbers. Then Oscar reveals that he has a home. He takes Rasmus to his home, where Oscar's wife is already waiting for Oscar. The couple decides to adopt Rasmus as their child.

== Background ==
The book is based on an radioplay written by Astrid Lindgren in the early 1950s. In 1955 the radioplay was turned into the Swedish film Luffaren och Rasmus. The screenplay was written by Astrid Lindgren. One year later the novel Rasmus and the Vagabond was published. After this the films Erazem in potepuh and Rasmus-brodyaga were produced in Slovenia and the Soviet Union. In 1981 another Swedish film was made: Rasmus på luffen by Olle Hellbom.

The story has also been adapted to theater stage as Rasmus and the Tramp by Staffan Götestam who played Jonathan in Astrid Lindgren's The Brothers Lionheart.

== Reception ==
In 1958 Astrid Lindgren received the Hans Christian Andersen Award for her book Rasmus and the Vagabond.

Atle Hetland from The Nation believed that with this book Lindgren is "drawing attention to class and social inequality issues". He stated that the orphan Rasmus is "cared better for by a homeless man than all the social workers and bourgeois pillars of society". The relationship of the boy and the homeless man is described "in a moving and unfussy way".

Kirkus Reviews wrote that "Rasmus has all the appeal of the spirited and neglected orphan and his sentimental alliance with a hobo is handled with a winning freshness".

== Sources ==
- Glistrup, Eva (2002). The Hans Christian Andersen Awards, 1956–2002. International Board on Books for Young People.
