= Nils Karlsson Pyssling =

- Directed by: Staffan Götestam
- Written by: Astrid Lindgren
- Produced by: Ingrid Dalunde
- Starring: Oskar Löfkvist; Jonatan Lindoff; Britta Pettersson; Charlie Elvegård; Ulla Sallert
- Distributed by: AB Svensk Filmindustri
- Release date: 9 November 1990
- Running time: 75 minutes
- Country: Sweden
- Language: Swedish

Nils Karlsson Pyssling is a 1990 Swedish family film based on the short story with the same name by Astrid Lindgren.

== Cast ==
- Oskar Löfkvist as Bertil
- Jonatan Lindoff as Nils
- Britta Pettersson as Mother
- Charlie Elvegård as Father
- Ulla Sallert as Hulda
