= Pippi Longstocking (disambiguation) =

Pippi Longstocking is the titular fictional character in a series of children's books by Swedish author Astrid Lindgren.

Pippi Longstocking may also refer to:

- Pippi Longstocking (novel), a Swedish children's novel by Astrid Lindgren
- Pippi Longstocking (1949 film), a Swedish film
- Pippi Longstocking (1961 film), a film made in the United States
- Pippi Longstocking (1969 TV series), a Swedish/German TV series of thirteen episodes, re-edited as two dubbed TV-series feature films and two dubbed feature films for distribution in the United States, including:
  - Pippi Longstocking (1969 film), a Swedish movie
  - Pippi Goes on Board (film)
  - Pippi in the South Seas (film)
  - Pippi on the Run
- The New Adventures of Pippi Longstocking, a 1988 fantasy-adventure-musical film
- Pippi Longstocking (1997 film), an animated film co-produced by AB Svensk Filmindustri and Nelvana
  - Pippi Longstocking (1997 TV series), a Canadian animated television series that ran 1997–1998 and spun off from the 1997 film
- Pippi Longstocking (musical), 1969 Estonian musical by Ülo Vinter ja Ülo Raudmäe
