= Pippi Longstocking (novel) =

1945 children's book by Astrid Lindgren

- Cover of first edition
- Author: Astrid Lindgren
- Original title: Pippi Långstrump
- Illustrator: Ingrid Vang Nyman
- Language: Swedish
- Series: Pippi Longstocking
- Genre: Children's novel
- Publisher: Rabén & Sjögren
- Publication date: November 1945
- Publication place: Sweden
- Media type: Print
- Pages: 174
- ISBN: 0-14-030957-8 (Puffin Modern Classics, 1997)
- OCLC: 2798770
- LC Class: PZ7.L6585 Pi (first U.S.)

Pippi Longstocking (Swedish: Pippi Långstrump) is a Swedish children's novel by writer Astrid Lindgren, published by Rabén & Sjögren with illustrations by Ingrid Vang Nyman in 1945. Translations have been published in more than 40 languages, commonly with new illustrations.

The first English language translation was published late in 1950 by The Viking Press in the United States with illustrations by Louis S. Glanzman.

== Origin ==
Lindgren originally told Pippi stories to her daughter Karin in 1941, when the seven-year-old was home sick with pneumonia. She wrote the first manuscript during her injury three years later. After it was rejected by Bonniers, Lindgren developed the nonsensical aspects further and submitted the revised version to the 1945 children's book contest sponsored by Rabén & Sjögren, a rather new publisher.

Pippi won the contest that closed on August 1, Rabén & Sjögren arranged for illustrations by Ingrid Vang Nyman (her debut in Sweden), and the first edition was published in November.

== Plot ==
The book focuses on the experiences of Pippi Långstrump, a nine-year-old pigtailed redhead whose mother died when she was a baby and whose father, a sea captain, has seemingly vanished at sea, so she moves into a big house known as Villa Villekulla, located in a little Swedish village, with her pet monkey Mr. Nilsson, a suitcase filled with pieces of gold, and her unnamed pet horse. Gifted with superhuman strength and countless other eccentricities, Pippi is soon befriended by two local siblings named Annika and Tommy Settergren, who admire her and enjoy her company. Having spent her entire life at sea, Pippi has a limited knowledge of common courtesy and average childhood behaviour that adds humour to the story when she attempts to enroll at Tommy and Annika's school, attends a circus, and attends a coffee party hosted by Mrs. Settergren.

== Reception ==
In 2002 the Norwegian Nobel Institute listed the novel as one of the "Top 100 Works of World Literature", based on polling one hundred authors from fifty-four countries. In 2012 it was ranked number 91 on a list of the top 100 children's novels published by School Library Journal.

== Series ==
Three full-length Pippi books were published in 1945–1948, followed by three short stories in later years. Additionally, excerpts from the original chapter books have been illustrated and published as picture books.

== Adaptations ==
=== Film ===
Films were distributed by G.G. Communications, a film distribution company based in Boston, Massachusetts

==== Pippi Longstocking (1949 film) ====
The first movie adaptation of Pippi Longstocking was filmed in 1949. The film was based on three of the books, but several storylines were changed and characters were removed and added. Pippi's character was played by Viveca Serlachius. It was directed by Per Gunvall and released on December 9, 1949.

==== Pippi Longstocking (1971 film) ====
In 1971, Japanese animators Hayao Miyazaki and Isao Takahata had expressed great interest in doing an anime feature adaptation of Pippi Longstocking. The proposed project was titled Pippi Longstocking, The Strongest Girl in the World (長靴下のピッピ 世界一強い女の子, Nagakutsushita no Pippi, Sekai Ichi Tsuyoi Onna no Ko). They traveled to Sweden, and not only did research for the film (they went location scouting in Visby, one of the major locations where the 1969 TV series was filmed), but also personally visited creator Astrid Lindgren, and discussed the project with her. However, their permission to complete the film was denied by Lindgren, after their meeting with the author and the project was canceled. Among what remains of the project are watercolored storyboards by Miyazaki himself.

==== Peppi Dlinnyychulok (1984 film) ====
A Mosfilm television film version, Peppi Dlinnyychulok, was released in 1984. It was produced by Margaret Mikalan, and starred Mikhail Boyarsky, Lev Durov and Tatiana Vasilieva. Pippi was played by Svetlana Stupak, and her singing voice was provided by Svetlana Stepchenko.

==== The New Adventures of Pippi Longstocking (1988 film) ====
A US feature film version from Columbia Pictures was released in 1988, directed by British veteran director Ken Annakin, starring Tami Erin as Pippi with Eileen Brennan, Dennis Dugan, John Schuck and Dick Van Patten in supporting roles. While the title suggests a continuation, the film is in fact just a retelling of the original story. The original songs and the score were composed by Misha Segal.

==== Pippi Longstocking (1997 film and TV series) ====
An animated film adaptation by Nelvana, Pippi Longstocking, was released in 1997 and was further adapted into an animated television series, Pippi Longstocking also by Nelvana, which aired for one season (1997) on Canada's Teletoon channel and later (1998) on HBO in the United States. Reruns are shown on the Qubo digital subchannel. While the movie used traditional animation, the series used the newer digital inking process.

=== Television ===
==== Shirley Temple's Storybook (1961 episode) ====
In 1961, the American children's anthology TV series Shirley Temple's Storybook (hosted by Shirley Temple) included an adaptation of Pippi Longstocking, Episode 2-15, aired on January 8. This was the first American adaptation of Astrid Lindgren's character, not to mention the first adaptation done in color, and the first to feature a child actress playing Pippi—in this case, Gina Gillespie, who also plays the girl named Susan Scholfield, who appears at the beginning and end of the story with her sister Betsy (played by Gina's younger sister Jennifer), both dreaming up the whole story after being sent to bed early.

Gina (1951) is the younger sister of former Mouseketeer Darlene Gillespie (1941), a lead singer and dancer of the original 9 member Red Team in 1955. Although the story is mostly faithful to the original books, a few liberties are taken; Pippi is shown to be extremely intelligent (flawlessly answering a strict but well-meaning teacher's questions), which she attributes to her firsthand experiences in her world travels, and Pippi can fly (rather, she lands softly onto the ground from the rooftop of her house, à la Peter Pan). Among the characters, Pippi's originally nameless pet horse is named Horatio, and Thunder-Karlsson and Bloom are renamed "Scar Face" Seymour and "Mad Dog" Jerome. Also of note is Swedish wrestler/actor Tor Johnson, in one of his final roles, playing a circus strongman, the Mighty Adolf, whom Pippi challenges to a match of strength at the circus.

==== Pippi Longstocking (1969 TV series) ====
A Swedish Pippi Longstocking television series was created based on the books in 1968. The first episode was broadcast on Sveriges Radio TV in February 1969. The production was a Swedish–West German co-production and several German actors had roles in the series.

As Astrid Lindgren was unhappy with the 1949 adaptation, she wrote the script herself for this version. The series was directed by Olle Hellbom who also directed several other Astrid Lindgren adaptations. Inger Nilsson gave a confident, oddball performance that was uncommonly consistent and eccentric for a child actress.

This version is the most well-known version in Sweden and has been repeated numerous times by SR/SVT. In other European countries this is the most favoured version of Pippi Longstocking.

The Swedish series was re-edited as two dubbed feature films for United States distribution:

- Pippi Longstocking (Swedish title: Pippi Långstrump) (1969) (USA release 19745)
- Pippi Goes on Board (Swedish title: Här kommer Pippi Långstrump) (1969) (USA release 1975)

Another two feature film spin-offs were also shown in the United States:

- Pippi in the South Seas (Swedish title: Pippi Långstrump på de sju haven) (1970) (USA release 1975)
- Pippi on the Run (Swedish title: På rymmen med Pippi Långstrump) (1970) (USA release 1977)

They became weekend television staples in several cities in the United States throughout the 1970s and 1980s. The first 6 episodes of the original TV series, newly dubbed using British actors, became available on DVD in 2002.

==== Pippi Longstocking (1985 TV special) ====
In 1985, Carrie Kei Heim played the title role in the 3-part ABC Weekend Special, entitled Pippi Longstocking. Directed by Colin Chilvers, Part 1 of the special aired on November 2, and Part 2 aired on November 10.
