= Pippi Longstocking (1969 film) =

- The DVD cover by Joseph Smith
- Directed by: Olle Hellbom
- Written by: Astrid Lindgren (novel)
- Produced by: Ernst Liesenhoff; Olle Nordemar
- Starring: Inger Nilsson; Maria Persson; Pär Sundberg
- Cinematography: Kalle Bergholm
- Edited by: Jan Perrson; Jutta Schweden
- Music by: Konrad Elfers
- Production companies: Beta Film; KB Nord Art; Svenks AB; Sveriges Radio
- Distributed by: Jugendfilm (West Germany); Svensk Filmindustri (Sweden)
- Release dates: May 9, 1969 (West Germany); December 25, 1973 (USA)
- Running time: 100 min.
- Countries: Sweden; West Germany
- Languages: Swedish, German

Pippi Longstocking (original German title: Pippi Langstrumpf) is a 1969 Swedish/West German movie, based on the eponymous children's books by Astrid Lindgren with the cast of the 1969 TV series Pippi Longstocking. The film consisted of re-edited footage from the TV series featuring a new soundtrack. It was produced by Beta Film, one of the German co-producers of the original show, while the Swedish TV series was still in post-production and has never been aired in Sweden. The movie was followed by Pippi Goes on Board, released later in the same year. It was released in the US in 1973.

== Plot ==
A mysterious young girl, Pippi Longstocking, moves into the abandoned Villa Villekulla. The redheaded Pippi, living alone but for a monkey called Mr. Nilsson and her horse Little Old Man, befriends two neighboring children, Tommy and Annika. Soon inseparable companions, the three youngsters embark upon a series of colorful escapades, which turn the small Swedish town upside down. Local busybody Miss Prysselius schemes to have Pippi put into a children's home, and sets the town's bumbling cops Kling and Klang on her with riotous results.

== Cast ==
Character	Original actor	English Dubbing
Pippi Longstocking	Inger Nilsson	Susan Davis
Annika	Maria Persson	
Tommy	Pär Sundberg	
Captain Efraim Longstocking	Beppe Wolgers	
Mrs. Prysselius	Margot Trooger	
Mrs. Prysselius	Gun Arvidsson (voice)	
Dunder-Karlsson	Hans Clarin	
Dunder-Karlsson	Gösta Prüzelius (voice)	
Blom	Paul Esser	
Blom	Hans Lindgren (voice)	
Police Inspector Kling	Ulf G. Johnsson	
Police Inspector Kling	Per Sjöstrand (voice)	
Police Inspector Klang	Göthe Grefbo	
Mr. Settergren	Fredrik Ohlsson	
Mrs. Settergren	Öllegård Wellton	
Benke	Staffan Hallerstam	

=== Dubbing Staff ===
- Voice Director: Gordon Zahler

== In popular culture ==
The film is shown in the episode "We Got Us a Pippi Virgin" of season 5 of Gilmore Girls. In the episode, Rory Gilmore and Lorelai Gilmore profess their love for the film and choose to watch it in place of Cool Hand Luke.

== See also ==
- Pippi Longstocking - character
- Pippi Longstocking - Swedish television series
