= Pippi Goes on Board =

Pippi Goes on Board may refer to

- Pippi Goes on Board (book) a 1946 novel by Astrid Lindgren
- Pippi Goes on Board (film) a 1973 film based on the book
