= Pippi in the South Seas =

Pippi in the South Seas may refer to

- Pippi in the South Seas (book) a 1948 novel by Astrid Lindgren
- Pippi in the South Seas (film) a film based on the book
