= Kisa, Sweden =

Kisa
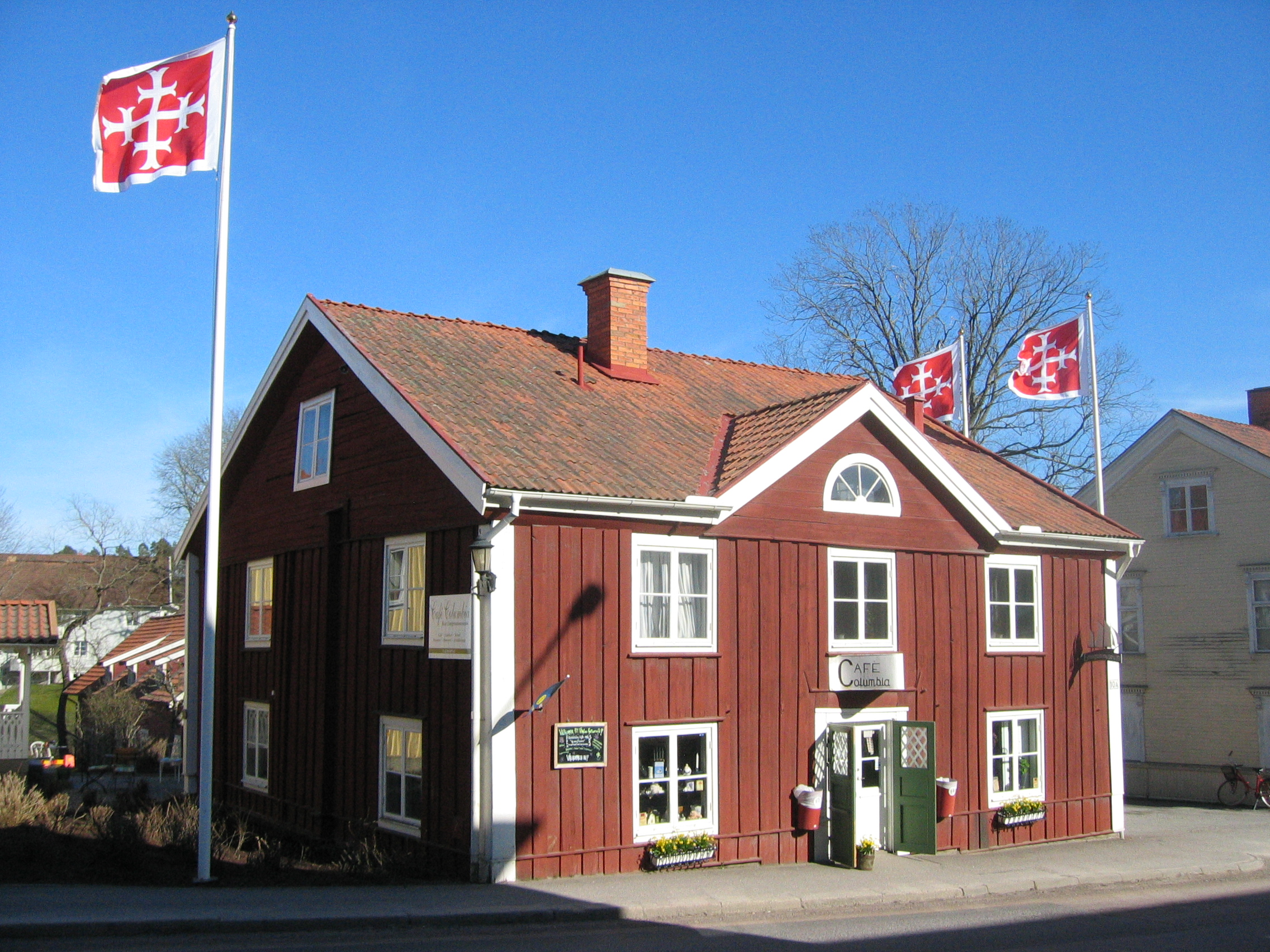
- Café Columbia with its emigration museum is right on national road 34, passing through the small town. Kinda municipality's coat of arms is seen on the flags.

- Location within Östergötland Location within Sweden
- Coordinates: 57°59′N 15°37′E
- Country: Sweden
- Province: Östergötland
- County: Östergötland County
- Municipality: Kinda Municipality

Area
  - Total: 4.03 km^{2} (1.56 sq mi)

Population (31 December 2010)
  - Total: 3,687
  - Density: 916/km^{2} (2,370/sq mi)
- Time zone: UTC+1 (CET)
  - Summer (DST): UTC+2 (CEST)
- Climate: Cfb

Kisa is a locality and the seat of Kinda Municipality, Östergötland County, Sweden with 3,687 inhabitants in 2010.

Actress Karin Inger Monica Nilsson, who starred as Pippi Longstocking in the 1969 TV series based on the book by Astrid Lindgren, was born here. So was Met-Rx World Strongest Man 1998 winner, Magnus Samuelsson.

== Sports ==
The following sports clubs are located in Kisa:

- Kisa BK
