= Douglas (parrot) =

Scarlet macaw, parrot actor

- Species: Scarlet macaw
- Sex: Male
- Hatched: c. 1967; Brazil
- Died: 23 February 2019 (aged 51); Karlsruhe, Germany
- Occupation: Actor
- Notable role: Rosalinda (Pippi in the South Seas)
- Mate: Gojan (2005–2016; her death)

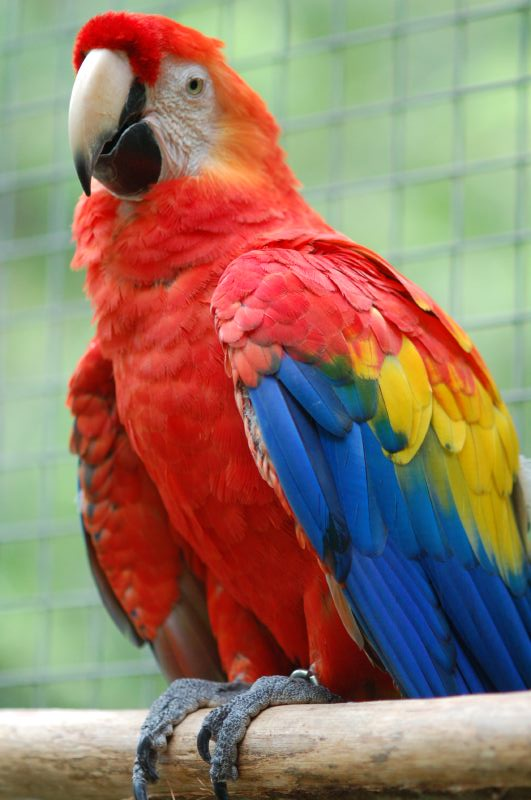
A scarlet macaw like Douglas

Douglas (c. 1967 – 23 February 2019) was a male scarlet macaw that played the parrot Rosalinda in the 1970 Pippi Longstocking film Pippi in the South Seas.

== Youth and movie stardom ==
Douglas was imported from Brazil to Sweden in 1967. Three years later he became famous due to starring as the parrot Rosalinda in Pippi in the South Seas. Douglas was capable of singing, speaking around 50 words in Swedish and following a few commands.

== Later life ==
In 2003, 33 years after Pippi in the South Seas, Douglas garnered much attention in the Swedish press when authorities were considering putting him to death because his owner did not have the proper paperwork. A petition pleading for Douglas's life received over 50,000 signatures, including that of actress Inger Nilsson, who played Pippi in the 1970 movie. Douglas was spared after his first owner in Sweden produced the correct paperwork, showing that Douglas had been legally imported from Brazil in 1967.

In 2005, Douglas was moved to a small tropical zoo in Malmö where he lived with a female blue-and-yellow macaw called Gojan. In early 2016, Douglas once more attracted the attention of the Swedish (and later German) media when authorities once again had plans to put Douglas to death, this time because his three-square-metre cage was too small and prohibited Douglas from flying. The authorities requested an aviary of at least 30 square metres, which the zoo could not provide, but zoo director Frank Madsen argued that the 49-year-old Douglas was incapable of flying anyway and that there was no sense in cutting the parrot's remaining years short. With the authorities unwilling to grant an exception, Madsen turned to the press and soon received more than 100 offers for a new home for Douglas and Gojan. The Karlsruhe Zoo in Germany was selected and in April, Madsen himself delivered Douglas and Gojan to Karlsruhe, where they were greeted with a public welcome party.

After Gojan died at the age of 45 in September 2016, the zoo paired Douglas with Rubin, a 22-year-old scarlet macaw that arrived in October. At the occasions of Douglas' 50th birthday the Karlsruhe Zoo organized a party and offered free entrance to children dressed up as Pippi Longstocking or as a pirate. Douglas died of natural causes at the Karlsruhe Zoo on 23 February 2019, aged 51.

== See also ==
- List of animal actors
- List of individual birds
