= Sjörövar-Fabbe =

Swedish song from the 1970 film Pippi Långstrump på de sju haven

"Sjörövar-Fabbe" (English: Pirate grandpa Fabian) is a Swedish shanty-style children's song originally written by Georg Riedel and Astrid Lindgren for the film Pippi in the South Seas (Pippi Långstrump på de sju haven) in 1970. The lyrics are about Pippi Longstocking's great grandfather Fabian "Fabbe" Longstocking who was a feared pirate captain on all seven seas. The last line of the chorus "Tjoa hadelittan lej" is a nonsense phrase. The song was originally performed by Pippi Longstocking actress Inger Nilsson who published it in 1975 as B-side of the single "Här kommer Pippi Långstrump". In 2001, it was covered as a crossover version with the melody of Dio's "Holy Diver" by the Swedish metal band Black Ingvars. Other Swedish versions are by Plura Jonsson in 1999, by Siw and Tove Malmkvist in 2003 and by Johanna Grüssner and Mika Pohjola who performed a jazz version of this song in 2006. A Norwegian version with lyrics by Marit Trulsrud is by Anita Hegerland and Frank Cook from 1970. There is also a German version called "Seeräuber-Opa Fabian" with lyrics by Helmut Harun. It was first performed by actress Eva Mattes in 1970 and covered in 2012 by German singer Lena Meyer-Landrut for the compilation album Giraffenaffen.
