= Stig Ossian Ericson =

Swedish actor, screenwriter, film director (1923–2012)

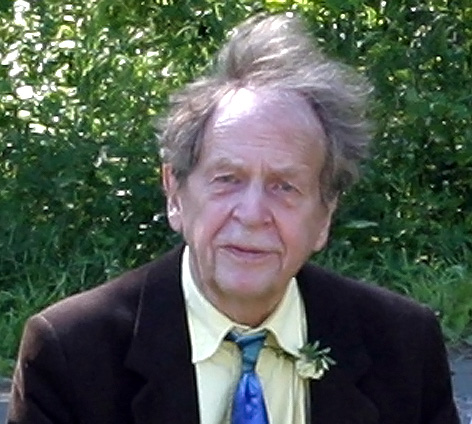
- Stig Ossian Ericsson in 2004.
- Born: 7 September 1923; Härnösand, Sweden
- Died: 30 July 2012 (aged 88); Nacka, Sweden
- Occupations: Actor, screenwriter

Stig Ossian Ericson (7 September 1923 – 30 July 2012) was a Swedish actor, director, and screenwriter.

== Life and career ==
Ericson was born in 1923 in Härnösand, but grew up in Nyköping. Graduating at the University of Uppsala where he had been involved in various theatrical performances at the Södermanlands-Nerikes nation, he began his professional career as a mathematics teacher. He changed into the theater track in the early 1960s when he participated in the Snudd revue at the Casino Theatre in Stockholm. He later worked with Hans Alfredson and Tage Danielsson, Bo Widerberg and Beppe Wolgers.

He is probably best known as Sigurd in the Swedish block buster Göta kanal eller Vem drog ur proppen?, lillebror's father in Astrid Lindgren's Karlsson på taket, and in the 1990s as Father Fouras in Fångarna på fortet, the Swedish version of French game show Fort Boyard. In 1995, he played Geppetto in a radio play of Pinocchio.

Ericson died in 2012, at the age of 88, in Nacka east of Stockholm.
