= Skymningssagor =

- Genre: children
- Narrated by: Nils Eklund, Lennart R. Svensson, Jan Nygren, Lena Söderblom, Anita Ekström and Mikaela Nygren
- Country of origin: Sweden
- Original language: Swedish

Original release
- Network: SVT1
- Release: 24 October 1988 – 16 November 1998

Skymningssagor was a children's programming originally airing over SVT's SVT 1 between 24 October 1988 – 16 November 1998. Every episode includes a story-tale usually told by silent pictures and narrator. Among the stories were the Sven Nordqvist books about Pettson and Findus. The intro and outro scenes showed a model-landscape with a town and a rural district at twilight, and a model train travelling across model railway tracks. The picture would them zoom in and out the location where the story was set. It was accompanied by a melody played on the piano.

Among the narrators were Nils Eklund, Lennart R. Svensson, Jan Nygren, Lena Söderblom, Anita Ekström and Mikaela Nygren.
