= Pippi in the South Seas (book) =

1948 children's book by Astrid Lindgren

- First edition
- Author: Astrid Lindgren
- Original title: Pippi Långstrump i Söderhavet
- Illustrator: Ingrid Vang Nyman
- Language: Swedish
- Genre: Children's literature
- Publisher: Rabén & Sjögren
- Publication date: 1948
- Publication place: Sweden
- Pages: 166

Pippi in the South Seas is a 1948 sequel to Astrid Lindgren's classic children's books, Pippi Longstocking and Pippi Goes on Board. It is set sometime after the events of the original book and centers around Pippi's further misadventures and experiences, but also Pippi's theory that the reason for her father's mysterious disappearance that he was hailed as king of an island of natives is confirmed as true.

== Plot ==
Pippi Longstocking, a little girl meets a stubborn billionaire, who tries to buy Villa Villekulla, her home, and dismisses her as ugly and ridiculous. She also looks for a thing called a 'spink" and irritating a rich woman known as Ms.Rosenbloom, who gives the good pupils a Gold coin and a bag of Candy. She also soon receives word from her father, a sea captain who had seemingly vanished earlier, inviting her to a tropical island inhabited by natives over which he now reigns as king. Pippi and her friends sail to her father's island kingdom, where they become acquainted with the natives living there, Pippi being hailed as "Princess Pippilotta."

== Adaptation ==
The book was adapted into a 1970 film of the same name. In it, Pippi requests help from her friends Annika and Tommy as she ventures out onto the Sea to rescue her father who was captured by pirates. This came originally from a Swedish title PIPPI LÅNGSTRUMP PÅ DE SJU HAVEN [motion picture] alternate title: PIPPI IN TAKA-TUKA-LAND. Pippi Longstocking was played by Inger Nilsson, Annika played by Maria Persson and directed by Olle Hellbom.
