= Pippi Goes on Board (film) =

- The DVD cover
- Directed by: Olle Hellbom
- Written by: Astrid Lindgren (novel)
- Produced by: Ernst Liesenhoff; Olle Nordemar
- Starring: Inger Nilsson; Maria Persson; Pär Sundberg
- Edited by: Amrik Minku; John Cryer
- Music by: Christian Bruhn
- Production company: Beta Film
- Distributed by: Jugendfilm (West Germany); AB Svensk Filmindustri (Sweden)
- Release dates: 31 October 1969 (West Germany); 10 February 1973 (Sweden)
- Running time: 83 min.
- Countries: Sweden; West Germany
- Language: Swedish

Pippi Goes on Board (original German title: Pippi geht von Bord, Swedish title: Här kommer Pippi Långstrump) is a 1969 Swedish/West German film, based on the eponymous children's books by Astrid Lindgren with the cast of the 1969 TV series Pippi Longstocking. The film consisted of re-edited footage from the TV series. It was produced by Beta Film, one of the German co-producers of the TV series after the success of their first compilation movie Pippi Longstocking, using scenes and episodes not used in the first film. Despite its title, the film has little-to-nothing to do with the book of the same name in terms of story. The movie was eventually released in Sweden in 1973, where it has been poorly received, due to its disjointed continuity compared to the TV series. It was released in the US in 1975.

== Cast ==
- Inger Nilsson - Pippi Longstocking
- Pär Sundberg - Tommy
- Maria Persson - Annika
- Beppe Wolgers - Captain Efraim Longstocking
- Margot Trooger - Mrs. Prysselius
- Hans Clarin - Thunder-Karlsson
- Paul Esser - Bloom
- Ulf G. Johnsson - Kling
- Göthe Grefbo - Klang
- Fredrik Ohlsson - Mr. Settergren
- Öllegård Wellton - Mrs. Settergren
- Staffan Hallerstam - Benke

== See also ==
- Pippi Longstocking - The character
- Pippi Longstocking - The 1969 TV series
