= Olle Nordemar =

Swedish film producer and editor (1914–1999)

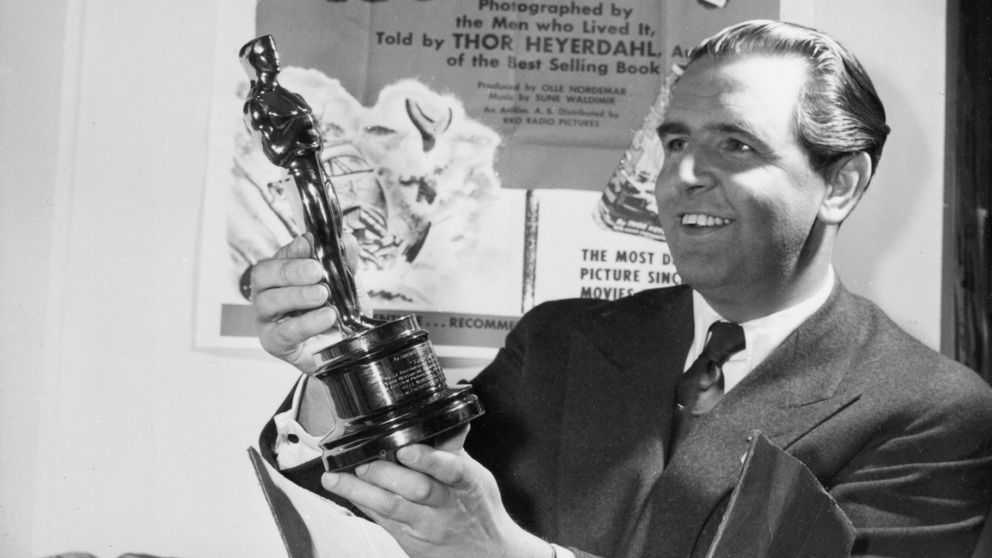
- Nordemar in 1951
- Born: Olof Harry Nordemar; 25 July 1914; Stockholm, Sweden
- Died: 18 February 1999 (aged 84); Stockholm, Sweden
- Occupation(s): Film director, editor, producer, cinematographer, screenwriter
- Years active: 1932–1983
- Spouse: Carmen Orrequia
- Children: 2

Olof Harry "Olle" Nordemar (25 July 1914 – 18 February 1999) was a Swedish film director, film editor, film producer, cinematographer and screenwriter. Nordemar is best known as the producer behind Olle Hellbom's films based on novels by Astrid Lindgren. Nordemar edited and produced the Norwegian-Swedish documentary Kon-Tiki (1950) which received the Academy Award for Best Documentary Feature for 1951 at the 24th Academy Awards.

== Career ==
Nordemar was born in Stockholm, Sweden and was brother to film editor and director Eric Nordemar. Nordemar was active in the film industry from 1932. After completing school education, Nordemar conducted laboratory practice in the film industry from 1931 to 1935. He was employed by the Army, Navy and Air Film (Armé-, Marin- och Flygfilm) to do work as photographer and editor from 1935 to 1940. Nordemar became chief photographer at the Sandrew Group in 1940 and was chief photographer at AB Europa Film from 1945.

He was cinematographer, director and producer in Hollywood from 1945 to 1946. In 1947, Nordemar and Lennart Bernadotte founded Artfilm AB and Artfoto AB which he became CEO of. When Bernadotte decided to settle on the castle of Mainau, he sold all his shares in Artfilm to Nordemar, who in the early 1950s became the sole owner. In 1966, AB Svensk Filmindustri (SF) bought all shares in Nordemar's Artfilm AB for SEK 1 million. The purchase also included the sister companies Artfoto AB and Artmekano AB. Nordemar was after that attached to SF for a period of seven years.

Nordemar produced nearly 40 films and television series during his career, in addition to directing, photographing and editing numerous others. Nordemar received the Academy Award for Best Documentary Feature for Kon-Tiki (1950) at the 24th Academy Awards in 1951.

He was a board member of the Association of Swedish Film Producers (Föreningen svenska filmproducenter), and others.

== Personal life ==
In 1940 he married the curator at the Nordic Museum, Carmen Orrequia. He was the father of Rolf (born 1943) and Hans (born 1945). Nordemar died in Stockholm in 1999 and is buried at Galärvarvskyrkogården in Stockholm.

== Filmography ==
Nordemar's filmography:

=== Director ===
- Nordkalotten (1951)
- Kon-Tiki (1950)
- Ett kungsord (1948)
- Fjällbiten (1947)
- Weekend i Nizza (1947)
- "När lillan kom till jorden ..." (1942)
- Skydda er gröda (1939)

=== Screenplay ===
- I Sagas värld (1948)

=== Producer ===
- Madicken på Junibacken (1980)
- Du är inte klok, Madicken (1979)
- The Brothers Lionheart (1977)
- Måndagarna med Fanny (1977)
- City of My Dreams (1976)
- A Guy and a Gal (1975)
- Världens bästa Karlsson (1974)
- Emil and the Piglet (1973)
- Here Comes Pippi Longstocking (1973)
- The Man Who Quit Smoking (1972)
- Kråkguldet (1969)
- Pippi Långstrump (1969)
- Konsert för piano, två ansikten och en fortsättning (1968)
- Modiga mindre män (1968)
- Vi på Saltkråkan (1968)
- Skrållan, Ruskprick och Knorrhane (1967)
- Tjorven och Skrållan (1965)
- Den gamla kvarnen (1964)
- Tjorven, Båtsman och Moses (1964)
- Bara roligt i Bullerbyn (1961)
- The Children of Bullerbyn Village (1960)
- Raggare! (1959)
- Frihet, samverkan, fred (1957)
- Bill Bergson Lives Dangerously (1957)
- Rasmus, Pontus och Toker (1956)
- Sveriges järnvägar (1956)
- Luffaren och Rasmus (1955)
- De historiska minnenas stad (1951)
- Tini-Kling (1951)
- Kon-Tiki (1950)
- I södra halvklotets största hamn (1948)

=== Production manager ===
- Emil and the Piglet (1973)
- Here Comes Pippi Longstocking (1973)
- Om 7 flickor (1973)
- Nya hyss av Emil i Lönneberga (1972)
- Emil i Lönneberga (1971)
- Pippi on the Run (1970)
- Pippi in the South Seas (1970)
- Pippi Långstrump (1969)
- Vi på Saltkråkan (1968)
- Tjorven och Mysak (1966)
- Tjorven och Skrållan (1965)
- Tjorven, Båtsman och Moses (1964)
- Bill Bergson and the White Rose Rescue (1953)
- Son of the Sea (1949)
- Bröllopsnatten (1947)

=== Cinematographer ===
- Fjällbiten (1947)
- Weekend i Nizza (1947)
- Barnen från Frostmofjället (1945)
- Tre söner gick till flyget (1945)
- En dag skall gry (1944)
- I Am Fire and Air (1944)
- I brist på bevis (1943)
- In Darkest Smaland (1943)
- Imprisoned Women (1943)
- "När lillan kom till jorden ..." (1942)
- Johanssons i Vrena (1942)
- Kan doktorn komma? (1942)
- Vårat gäng (1942)
- Klart. Tåg ut! (1941)
- När det gäller (1941)
- Sofiaflickorna i Vålådalen (1941)
- Någonstans i Sverige (1940)
- Solidaritet över havet (1940)
- Västkust i sol (1940)
- Skydda er gröda (1939)
- Vintersemester (1939)
- Jukkasjärvi
- Män, vapen och motorer (1937)
- Rullande hotell (1937)

=== Roles ===
- Mot härliga tider (1983)
- Jag är med barn (1979)
- Mannen som slutade röka (1972)
- Pippi Långstrump på de sju haven (1970)
- Mysteriet Artfilm (1954)
- Dumbo (1941)
- Privatfilm Olle Nordemar

=== Editor ===
- Madicken på Junibacken (1980)
- Goldorak, rymdfantomen (1976)
- Here Comes Pippi Longstocking (1973)
- Vi på Saltkråkan (1968)
- Stimulantia (1967)
- Aku-Aku - Påsköns hemlighet (1960)
- Kon-Tiki (1950)
- Weekend i Nizza (1947)
- Masstransporter i kristid (1942)
- Ungdom i skidskola (1942)

=== Other ===
==== Technical director ====
- Bröllopsnatten (1947)

==== First assistant cameraman ====
- Första divisionen (1941)

==== Still photographer ====
- Rasmus på luffen (1981)
