= Raggare! =

1959 film

Raggare! Blackjackets
- Directed by: Olle Hellbom
- Written by: Olle Hellbom
- Produced by: Olle Nordemar
- Starring: Christina Schollin; Bill Magnusson; Hans Wahlgren
- Cinematography: Bertil Palmgren
- Music by: Harry Arnold
- Production company: AB Europa Studios
- Release date: 13 November 1959 (Sweden)
- Running time: 88 minutes
- Country: Sweden
- Language: Swedish

Raggare! (in the UK released as Blackjackets) is a Swedish drama film which was released to cinemas in Sweden on 13 November 1959, directed by Olle Hellbom.

== Plot ==
A gang of car driving youngsters (raggare) hang out in a café outside Stockholm. The coolest among the youngsters, Roffe, kidnaps his girlfriend when discovering that she hangs out with guys from another gang.

== Cast ==
- Christina Schollin – Beatrice ”Bibban” Larsson
- Bill Magnusson – Roffe
- Hans Wahlgren – Lasse
- Svenerik Perzon – Lankan
- Sven Almgren – Svenne
- Lasse Starck – Svennes kompis
- Anita Wall – Annemarie
- Britta Brunius – fru Larsson
- Inga Botorp – Ninae
- Eva Engström – Eva
- Sven Holmberg – herr Larsson
- Tommy Johnson – Pipan
- Toivo Pawlo – Flintis dönicke
- Håkan Serner – Sven-Erik
