= Världens bästa Karlsson =

- Directed by: Olle Hellbom
- Written by: Astrid Lindgren
- Produced by: Olle Nordemar
- Starring: Lars Söderdahl; Mats Wikström
- Music by: Georg Riedel
- Distributed by: Svensk Filmindustri
- Release date: 2 December 1974 (Sweden)
- Running time: 99 minutes
- Country: Sweden
- Language: Swedish

Världens bästa Karlsson is a Swedish family film which was released to cinemas in Sweden on 2 December 1974, directed by Olle Hellbom. It is based on a book about Karlsson-on-the-Roof by Astrid Lindgren.

== Cast ==
- Lars Söderdahl as Svante 'Lillebror' Svantesson
- Mats Wikström as Karlsson
- Jan Nygren as Karlsson (voice)
- Catrin Westerlund as Lillebror's Mother
- Stig Ossian Ericson as Lillebror's Father
- Staffan Hallerstam as Bosse Svantesson
- Britt Marie Näsholm as Bettan Svantesson
- Nils Lagergren as Krister
- Maria Selander as Gunilla
- Pär Kjellin as Pelle
- Janne 'Loffe' Carlsson as Fille
