= Kisa BK =

Swedish football club

- Full name: Kisa Bollklubb
- Founded: 1925
- Ground: Kisa IP; Kisa; Sweden
- Chairman: Thomas Blixt
- League: Division 4 Östergötland Västra
Home colours	Away colours

Kisa BK (Kisa Bollklubb) is a Swedish football club located in Kisa, which was founded in 1925 and is still currently based in Kisa, Sweden.

== Background ==
Kisa BK currently plays in Division 4 Östergötland Västra which is the sixth tier of Swedish football. They play their home matches at the Kisa IP in Kisa.

Kisa BK are affiliated to Östergötlands Fotbollförbund.

== Season to season ==
Season	Level	Division	Section	Position	Movements
1999	Tier 5	Division 4	Östergötland Västra	8th	
2000	Tier 5	Division 4	Östergötland Västra	3rd	
2001	Tier 5	Division 4	Östergötland Västra	2nd	Promotion Playoffs
2002	Tier 5	Division 4	Östergötland Västra	1st	Promoted
2003	Tier 4	Division 3	Nordöstra Götaland	10th	Relegated
2004	Tier 5	Division 4	Östergötland Västra	1st	Promoted
2005	Tier 4	Division 3	Nordöstra Götaland	11th	Relegated
2006*	Tier 6	Division 4	Östergötland Västra	3rd	
2007	Tier 6	Division 4	Östergötland Västra	5th	
2008	Tier 6	Division 4	Östergötland Västra	1st	Promoted
2009	Tier 5	Division 3	Nordöstra Götaland	8th	
2010	Tier 5	Division 3	Nordöstra Götaland	10th	Relegated
2011	Tier 6	Division 4	Östergötland Västra	2nd	Promotion Playoffs

* League restructuring in 2006 resulted in a new division being created at Tier 3 and subsequent divisions dropping a level.
