= Villa Villekulla =

Fictional home of Pippi Longstocking

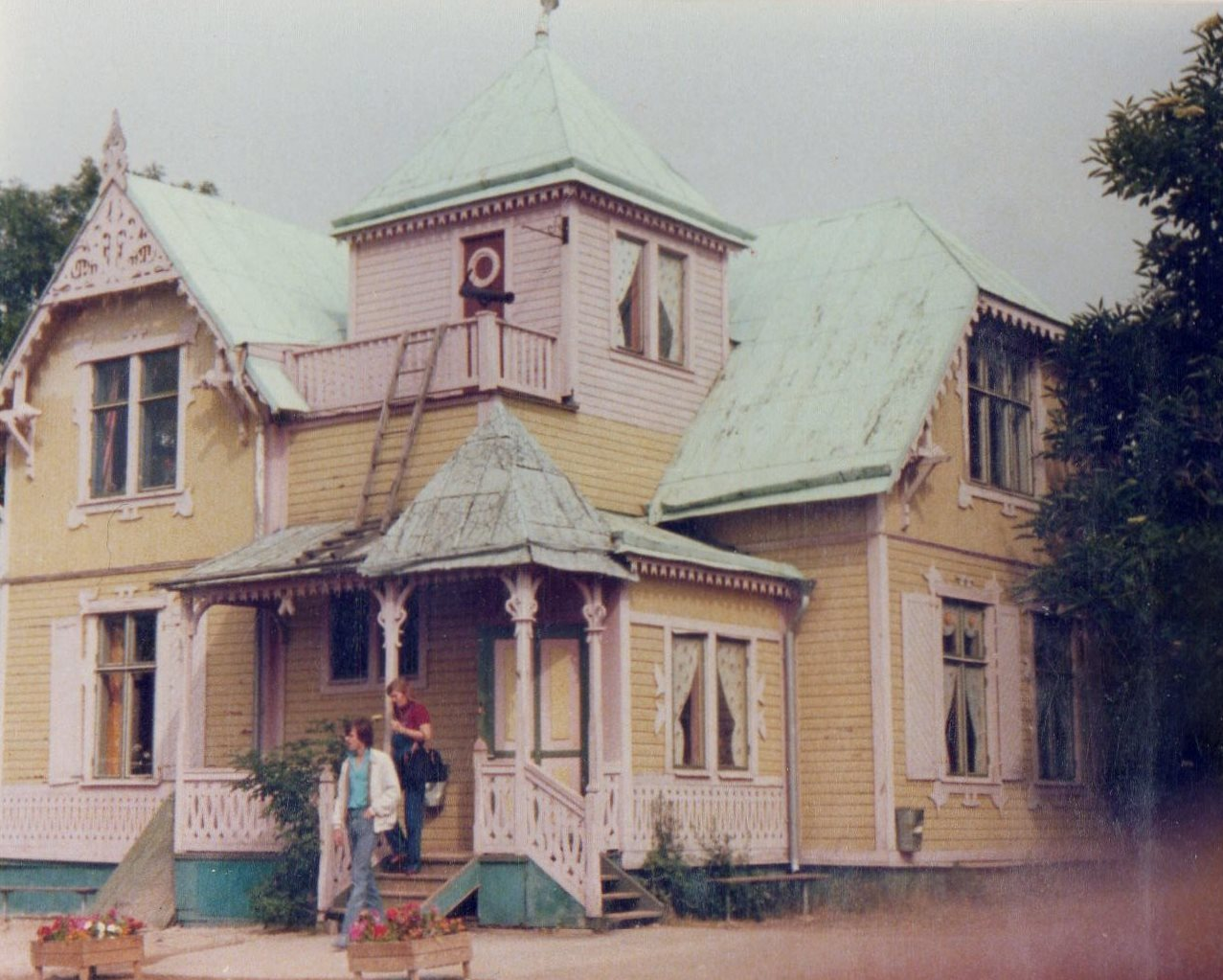
- Villa Villekulla in 1979
- Created by: Astrid Lindgren

In-universe information
- Type: Single-family house
- Location: Vibble, Gotland, Sweden
- Population: 1

Villa Villekulla is a fictional house that is the home of Pippi Longstocking, a character in a series of books by Swedish author Astrid Lindgren. She lives there with her horse, Lilla Gubben, and monkey, Mr. Nilsson. Outside stands a tree that grows Sockerdricka, a soft drink sold in Sweden.

== 1969 series and 1970 feature films ==
Until 1970, the physical house used during the TV series and some films starring Inger Nilsson was located in a garden belonging to the Gotland Infantry Regiment (I 18) in Visborgsslätt, Visby, on the Swedish island of Gotland. Built as early as 1902, before being used as a movie set it served as a steward's residence, as a private house, and later as an ammunition and underpants store. After being purchased by SVT, it was renovated and repainted in flamboyant colors for its new purpose. The garden where the so-called Villa Villekulla stood in that period can still be seen.

After the 1969 filming, the house was purchased by director Einar Nyberg for 53,000 kronor. In December 1969, the house was moved a few kilometers away to Kneippbyn, a theme park in the locality of Vibble. The house was moved on specially built metal rails that functioned as a sled. The films Pippi in the South Seas and Pippi on the Run were shot there and where the building remains to this day, open for visits.

== Gallery ==
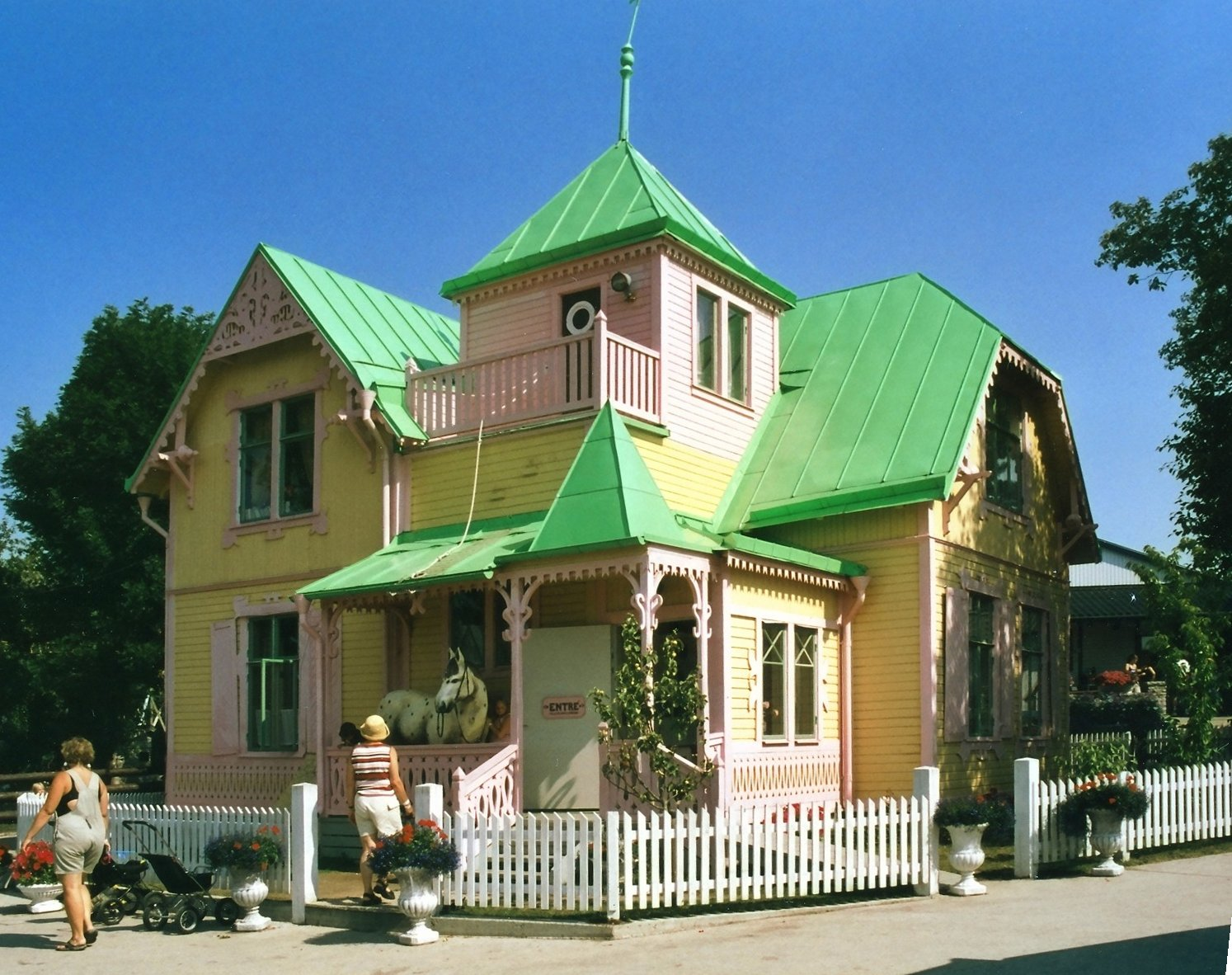
Outside, 2004

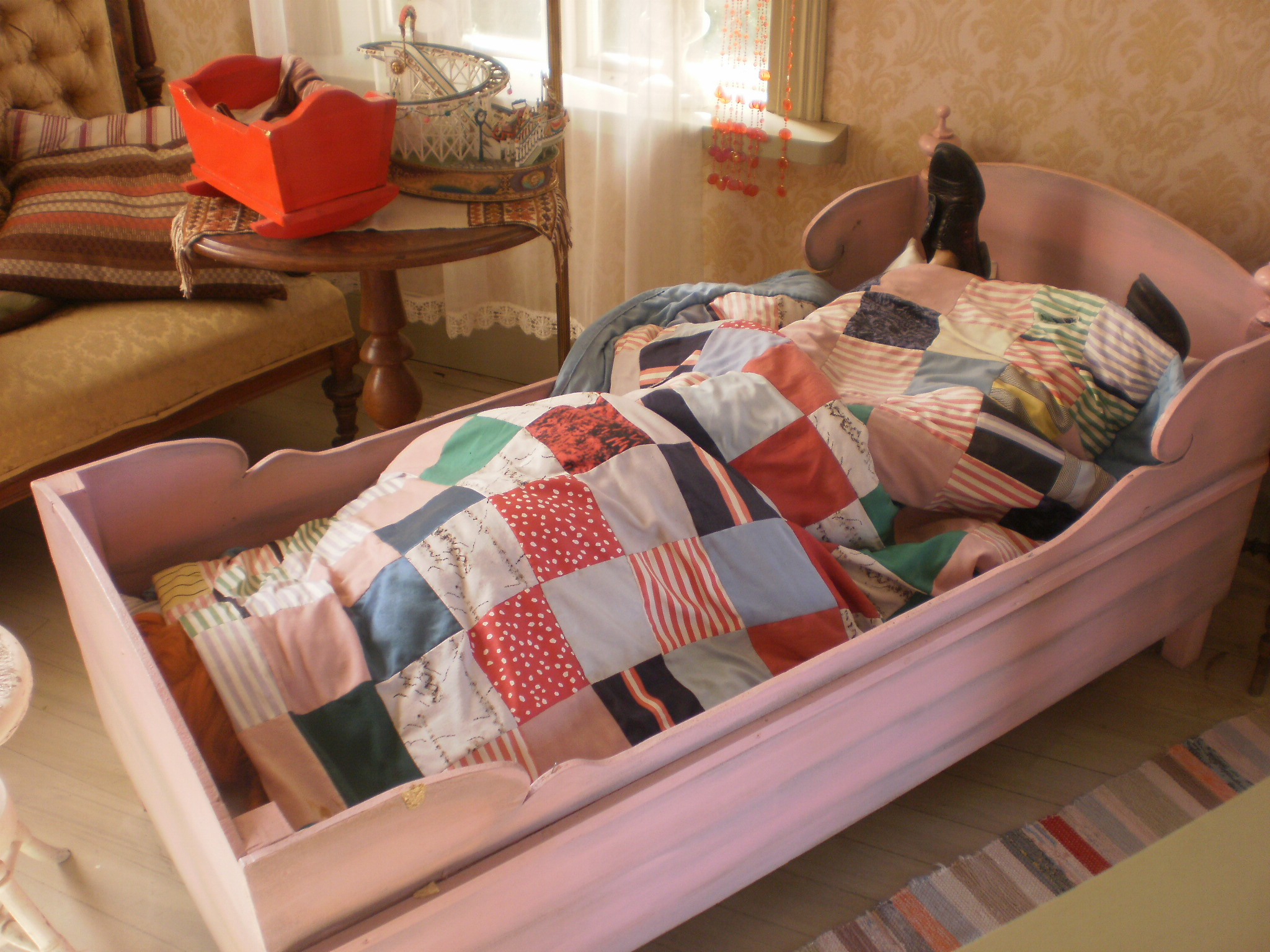
Pippi Longstocking's mannequin

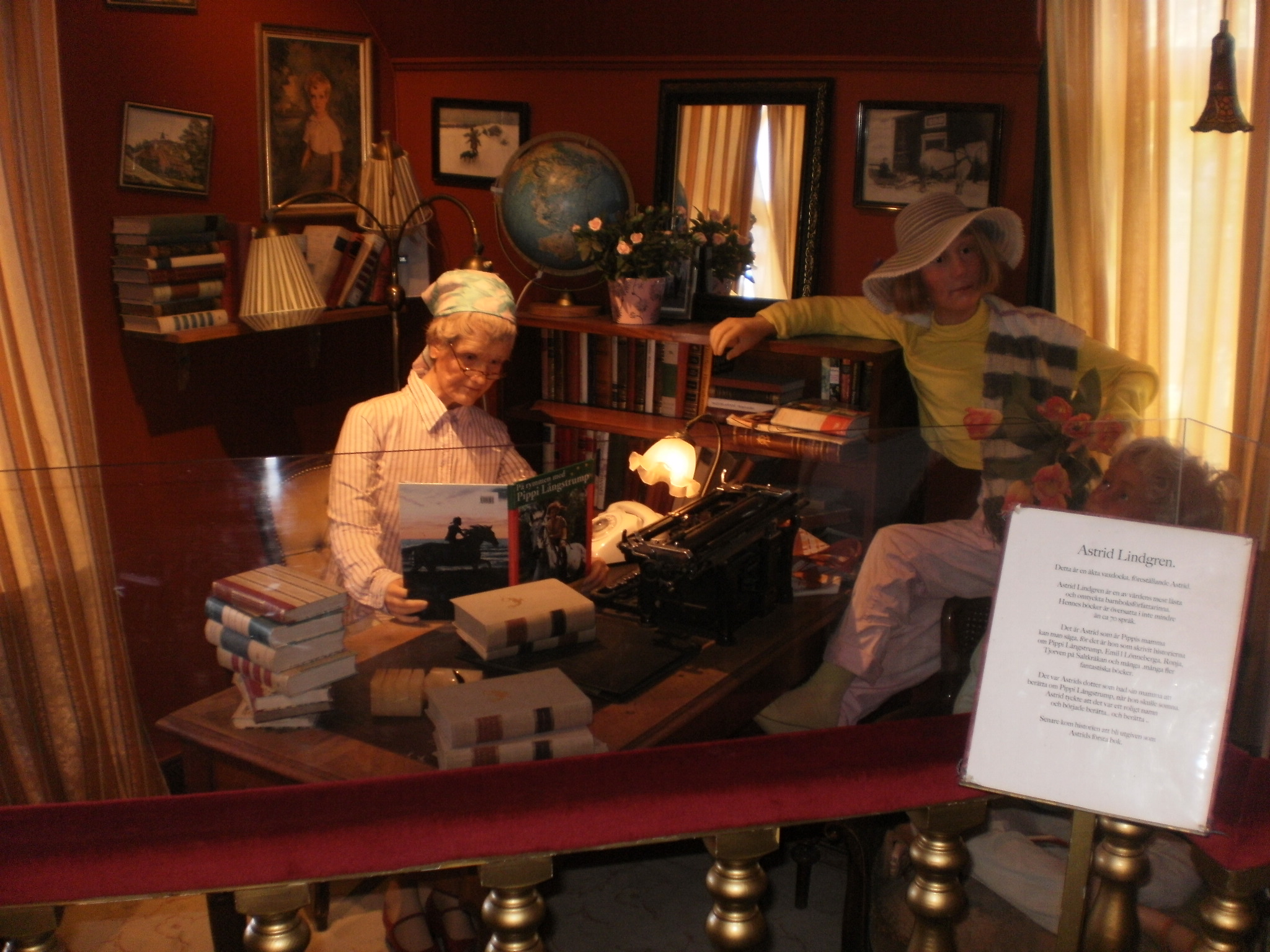
Astrid Lindgren's mannequin

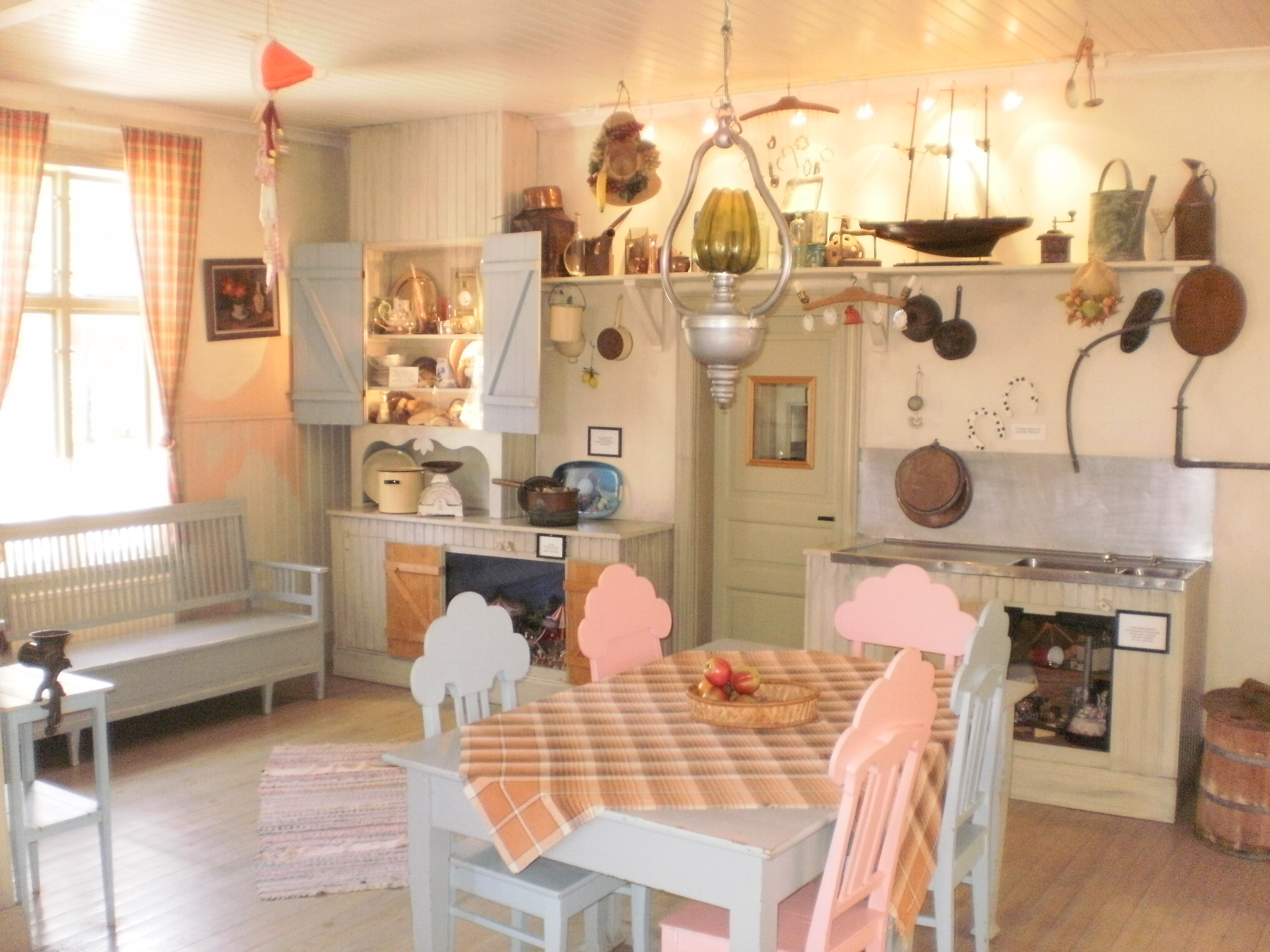
The kitchen

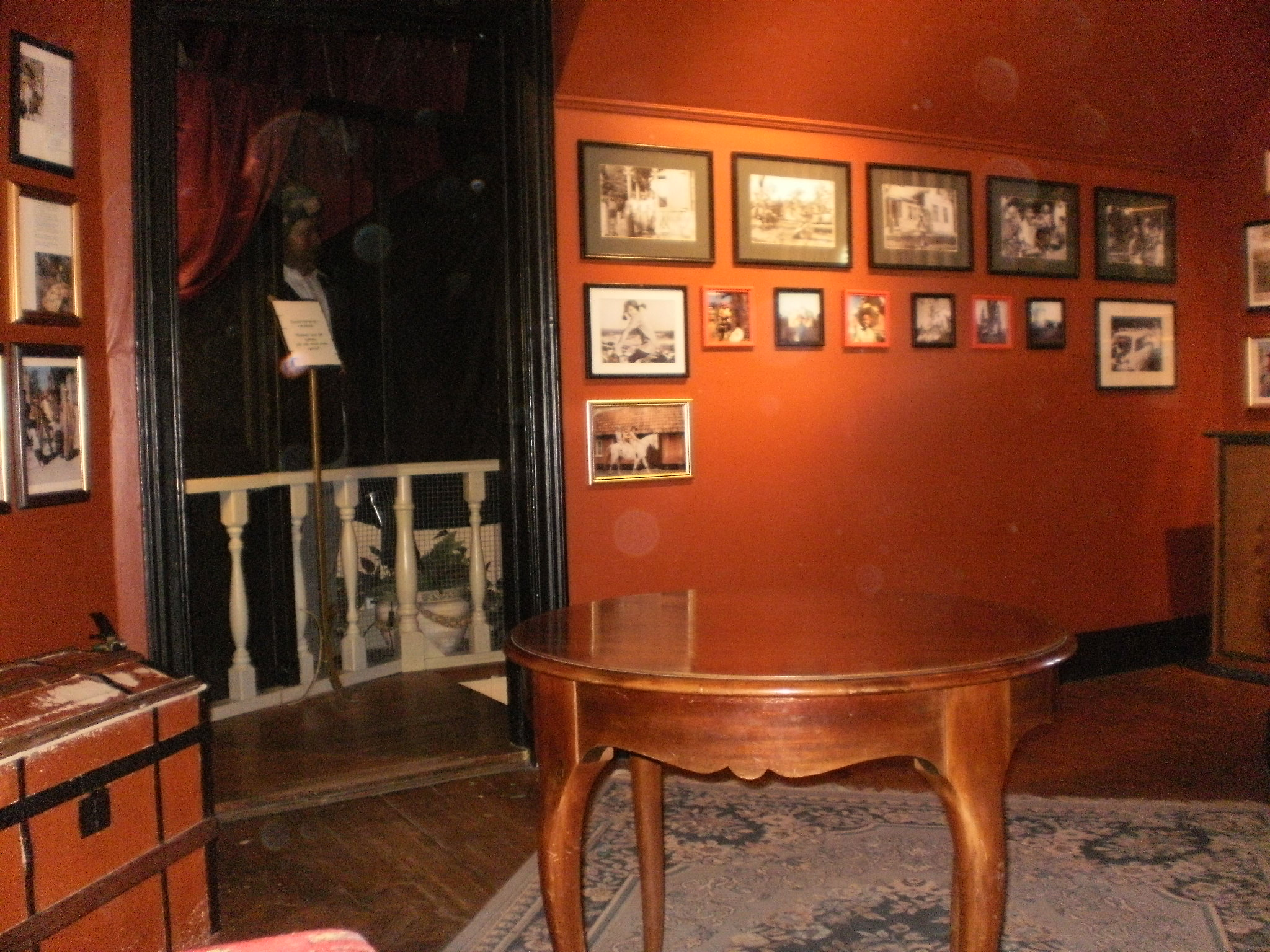
The living room
