= Pippi Goes on Board (book) =

1946 novel by Astrid Lindgren

- First edition (Swedish)
- Author: Astrid Lindgren
- Original title: Pippi Långstrump går ombord
- Illustrator: Ingrid Vang Nyman
- Language: Swedish
- Genre: Children's literature
- Publisher: Rabén & Sjögren
- Publication date: 1946
- Publication place: Sweden
- Pages: 192

Pippi Goes on Board is a 1946 sequel to Swedish writer Astrid Lindgren's classic children's chapter book, Pippi Longstocking. It was followed by a further sequel Pippi in the South Seas. It was filmed in 1969 for a TV series and edited into a film in 1969.
