= Pippi Longstocking (1949 film) =

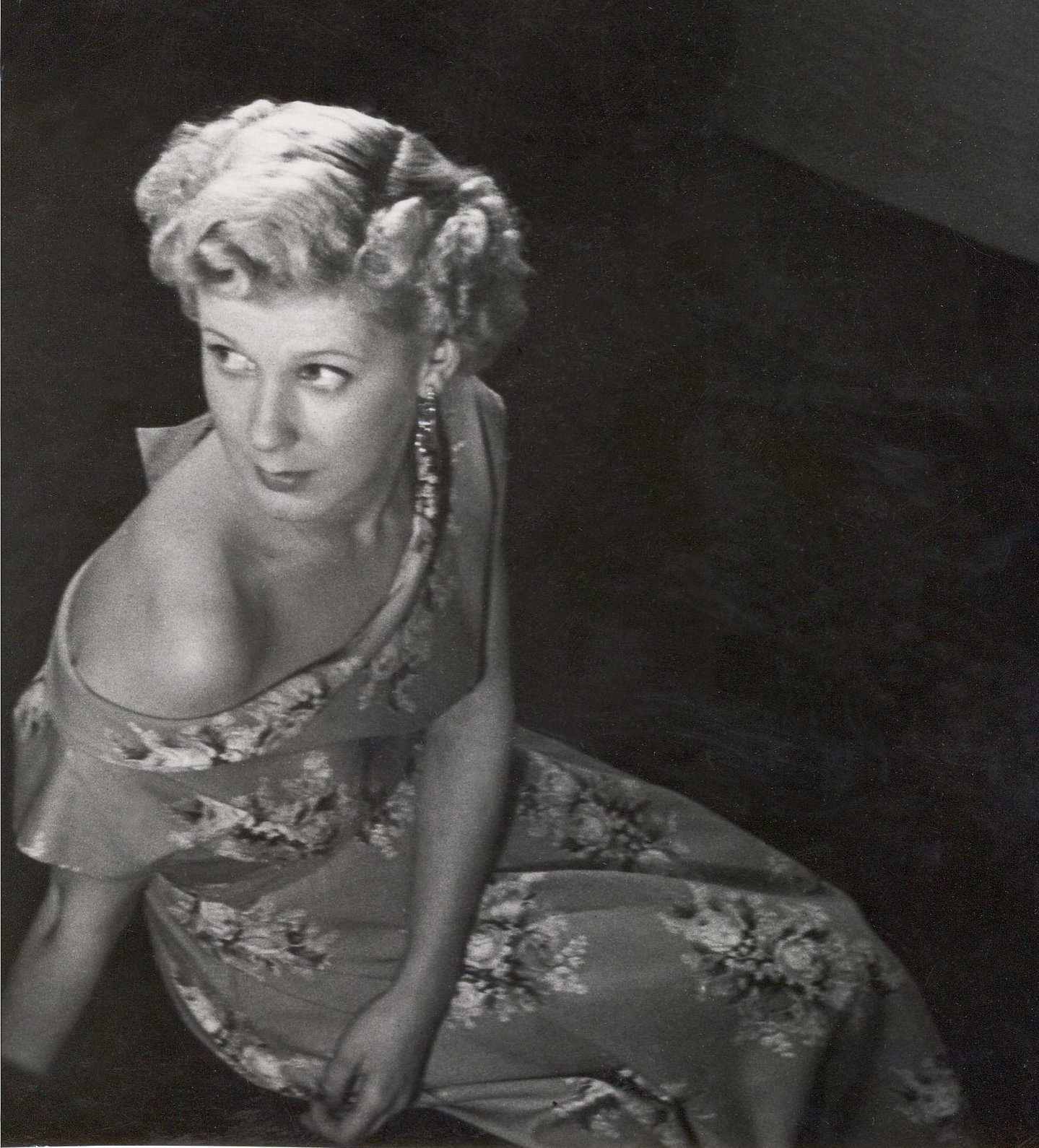
- Directed by: Per Gunvall
- Written by: Per Gunvall
- Based on: Pippi Longstocking by Astrid Lindgren
- Produced by: Rune Waldekranz
- Starring: Viveca Serlachius
- Cinematography: Curt Jonsson
- Edited by: Carl-Olov Skeppstedt
- Music by: Per-Martin Hamberg
- Release dates: 9 December 1949 (Sweden); 20 October 1950 (Finland)
- Running time: 89 minutes
- Country: Sweden
- Language: Swedish

Pippi Longstocking (orig. Pippi Långstrump) is a 1949 Swedish film directed by Per Gunvall and starring Viveca Serlachius as Pippi Longstocking. It is based on the famous children's novel of the same name by Astrid Lindgren.

== Cast ==
- Viveca Serlachius as Pippi Longstocking
- Tord Garnmark as Tommy
- Berit Essler as Annika
- Benkt-Åke Benktsson as Efraim Långstrump
- Svend Asmussen as Postman
- Julia Cæsar as School teacher
- Doreen Denning as Birgit
- Sigge Fürst as Valle Dunder-Karlsson
- Emy Hagman as Mrs. Settergren
- Stig Järrel as Record Dealer
- Arne Källerud as Policeman Larsson
- Carl-Gustaf Lindstedt as Piano salesman
- Gustaf Lövås as Policeman Karlsson
- Mona Mårtenson as Pia
- Carl Reinholdz as Ville Blom
