= Pippi Longstocking =

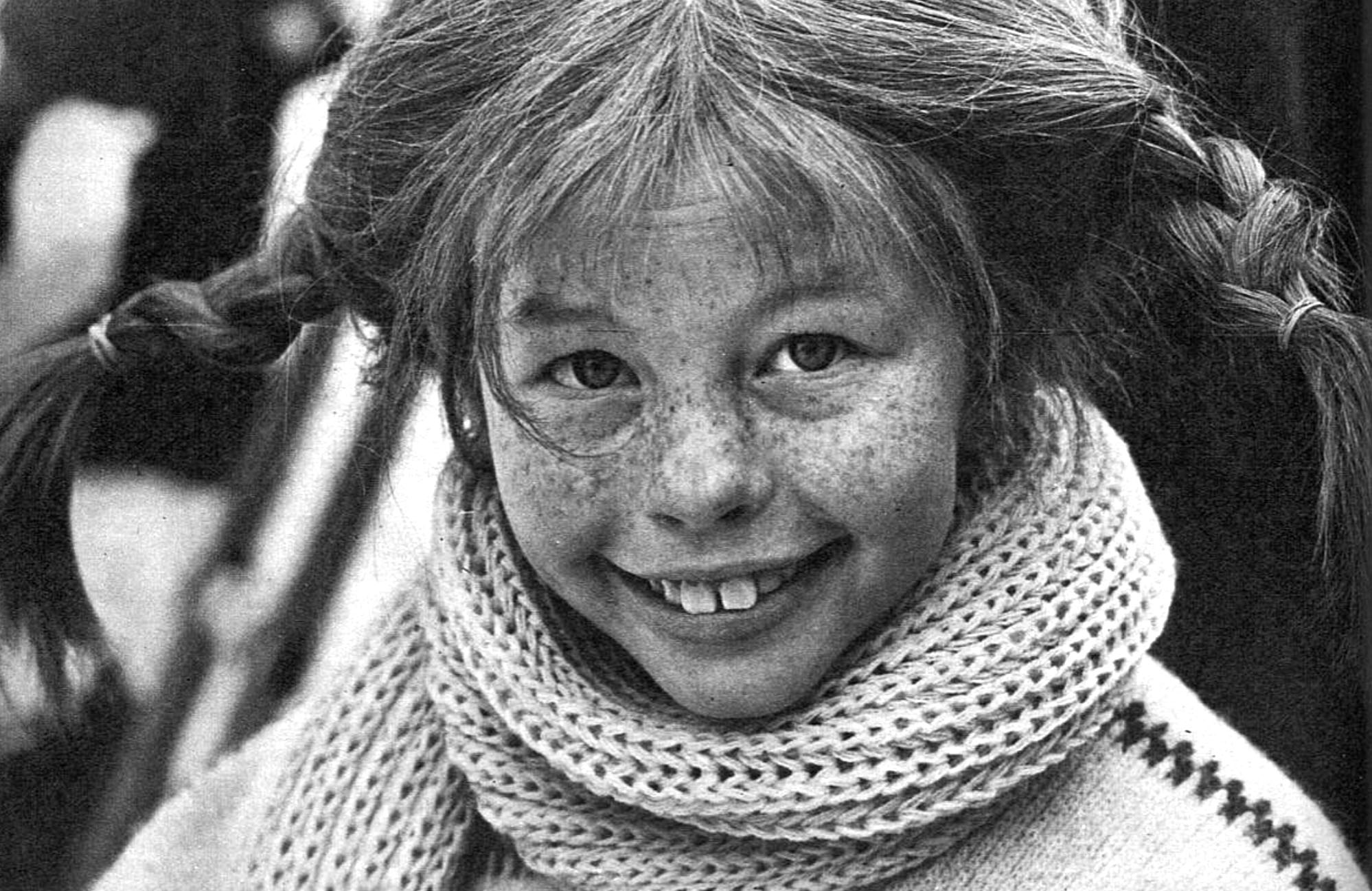
- Inger Nilsson as Pippi Longstocking
- First appearance: Pippi Longstocking (1945)
- Last appearance: Pippi in the South Seas (1948)
- Created by: Astrid Lindgren

In-universe information
- Nickname: Pippi
- Gender: Female
- Nationality: Swedish

Pippi Longstocking (Swedish: Pippi Långstrump) is the fictional main character in a series of children's books by Swedish author Astrid Lindgren (1907–2002). Pippi was named by Lindgren's daughter Karin, who asked her mother for a get-well story when she was off school.

Pippi is red-haired, freckled, unconventional and superhumanly strong – able to lift her horse one-handed. She is playful and unpredictable. She often makes fun of unreasonable adults, especially if they are pompous and condescending. Her anger comes out in extreme cases, such as when a man mistreats his horse. Pippi, like Peter Pan, does not want to grow up. She is the daughter of a buccaneer captain and has adventure stories to tell about that, too. Her four best friends are her horse and monkey, and the neighbours' children, Tommy and Annika.

After being rejected by Bonnier Publishers in 1944, Lindgren's first manuscript was accepted by Rabén and Sjögren. The three Pippi chapter books (Pippi Longstocking, Pippi Goes on Board, and Pippi in the South Seas) were published from 1945 to 1948, followed by three short stories and a number of picture book adaptations. They have been translated into 80 languages as of May 2025 and made into several films and television series.

== Character ==
Pippi Longstocking is a nine-year-old girl. At the start of the first novel, she moves into Villa Villekulla: the house she shares with her monkey, named Mr. Nilsson, and her horse that is not named in the novels but called Lilla Gubben (Little Old Man) in the movies. Pippi soon befriends the two children living next door, Tommy and Annika Settergren. With her suitcase of gold coins, Pippi maintains an independent lifestyle without her parents: her mother died soon after her birth; her father, Captain Ephraim Longstocking, goes missing at sea, ultimately turning up as king of a South Sea island. Despite periodic attempts by village authorities to make her conform to cultural expectations of what a child's life should be, Pippi happily lives free from social conventions. According to Eva-Maria Metcalf, Pippi "loves her freckles and her tattered clothes; she makes not the slightest attempt to suppress her wild imagination, or to adopt good manners." Pippi is literate and has a penchant for storytelling, which often takes the form of tall tales.

When discussing Pippi, Astrid Lindgren explained that "Pippi represents my own childish longing for a person who has power but does not abuse it." Although she is the self-proclaimed "strongest girl in the world", Pippi often uses nonviolence to solve conflicts, via guile, creativity with facts, and misdirection, such as to protect other children from bullying or excuse her chronic truancy. Pippi has been variously described by literary critics as "warm-hearted", compassionate, kind, clever, generous, playful, and witty to the point of besting adult characters in conversation. Laura Hoffeld wrote that while Pippi's "naturalness entails selfishness, ignorance, and a marked propensity to lie", the character "is simultaneously generous, quick and wise, and true to herself and others."

The inspiration for her father, Captain Ephraim Longstocking, came from the real life Carl Emil Pettersson, a Swedish sailor who became king of Tabar Island in Papua New Guinea after he was shipwrecked in 1904. He married the local king's daughter, and they had nine children.

One famous albeit incorrectly assigned quote by Pippi, summing up her character, is "I have never tried that before, so I think I should definitely be able to do that."

== Development ==
Biographer Jens Andersen locates a range of influences and inspiration for Pippi not only within educational theories of the 1930s, such as those of A. S. Neill and Bertrand Russell, but also contemporary films and comics that featured "preternaturally strong characters" (e.g., Superman and Tarzan). Literary inspiration for the character can be found in Lewis Carroll's Alice's Adventures in Wonderland, E. T. A. Hoffmann's The Strange Child, Lucy Maud Montgomery's Anne of Green Gables, and Jean Webster's Daddy Long Legs in addition to myths, fairytales, and legends. Andersen argues that the "misanthropic, emotionally stunted age" of the Second World War, during which Lindgren was developing the character, provided the most influence: the original version of Pippi, according to Andersen, "was a cheerful pacifist whose answer to the brutality and evil of war was goodness, generosity, and good humor."

Pippi originates from bedside stories told for Lindgren's daughter, Karin. In the winter of 1941, Karin had come down with an illness and was confined to her sickbed; inspired by Karin's request to tell her stories about Pippi Longstocking—a name Karin had created on the spot—Lindgren improvised stories about an "anything-but-pious" girl with "boundless energy". As a child, Karin related more to Annika and Tommy, rather than Pippi, who she felt was very different from her personality. Pippi became a staple within the household, with Karin's friends and cousins also enjoying her adventures. In April 1944, while recovering from a twisted ankle, Lindgren wrote her stories about Pippi in shorthand, a method she used throughout her writing career; a copy of the clean manuscript was turned into a homemade book for Karin and given to her on May 21, while another was posted to publisher Bonnier Förlag, where it was rejected in September on the grounds of being "too advanced".

After her critical success with her debut children's novel The Confidences of Britt-Mari (1944), Lindgren sent the manuscript for Pippi Longstocking to her editor at Rabén and Sjögren, the children's librarian and critic Elsa Olenius, in May 1945. Olenius advised her to revise some of the "graphic" elements, such as a full chamber pot being used as a fire extinguisher, and then to enter it into the upcoming competition at Rabén and Sjögren, which was for books targeted at children between the ages of six and ten. Critic Ulla Lundqvist estimates that a third of the manuscript was altered, with some changes made to improve its prose and readability, and others done to the character of Pippi, who according to Lundqvist "acquire[d] a new modesty and tenderness, and also a slight touch of melancholy," as well as "less intricate" dialogue. Pippi Longstocking placed first and was subsequently published in November 1945 with illustrations by Ingrid Vang Nyman. Two more books followed: Pippi Goes on Board (1946) and Pippi in the South Seas (1948). Three picture books were also produced: Pippi's After Christmas Party (1950), Pippi on the Run (1971), and Pippi Longstocking in the Park (2001).

== Name ==
Pippi in the original Swedish language books says her full name is Pippilotta Viktualia Rullgardina Krusmynta Efraimsdotter Långstrump. Although her surname Långstrump – literally long stocking – translates easily into other languages, her personal names are less easily translated, and one of them is a patronymic, Efraimsdotter, which is unfamiliar to many cultures. English language books and films about Pippi have given her name in the following forms:

- Pippilotta Rollgardinia Victualia Peppermint Longstocking
- Pippilotta Delicatessa Windowshade Mackrelmint Efraim's Daughter Longstocking
- Pippilotta Delicatessa Windowshade Mackrelmint Efraimsdotter Longstocking
- Pippilotta Provisionia Gaberdina Dandeliona Ephraimsdaughter Longstocking
- Pippilotta Victoriaria Tea-Cosy Appleminta Ephraim's Daughter Longstocking

In 2005, UNESCO published lists of the most widely translated books. In regard to children's literature, Pippi Longstocking was listed as the fifth most widely translated work with versions in 70 different languages. As of 2017, Lindgren's works had been translated into 100 languages. Here are the character's names in some languages other than English.

- In Afrikaans Pippi Langkous
- In Albanian Pipi Çorapegjata
- In Arabic جنان ذات الجورب الطويل Jinān ḏāt al-Jawrab aṭ-Ṭawīl
- In Armenian Երկարագուլպա Պիպին Erkaragulpa Pipin
- In Azerbaijani Pippi Uzuncorablı
- In Basque Pippi Kaltzaluze
- In Belarusian Піпі Доўгаяпанчоха Pipi Doŭhajapančocha
- In Bosnian, Montenegrin and Serbian Pipi Duga Čarapa / Пипи Дуга Чарапа
- In Bulgarian Пипи Дългото чорапче Pipi Dǎlgoto chorapche
- In Breton Pippi hir he loeroù
- In Catalan Pippi Calcesllargues
- In Chinese 长袜子皮皮 Chángwàzi Pípí
- In Croatian Pipi Duga Čarapa
- In Czech Pipilota Citrónie Cimprlína Mucholapka Dlouhá punčocha
- In Danish Pippi Langstrømpe
- In Dutch Pippi Langkous
- In Esperanto Pipi Ŝtrumpolonga
- In Estonian Pipi Pikksukk
- In Faroese Pippi Langsokkur
- In Filipino Potpot Habangmedyas
- In Finnish Peppi Pitkätossu
- In French Fifi Brindacier (literally "Fifi Strand of Steel")
- In Galician Pippi Mediaslongas
- In Georgian პეპი გრძელიწინდა Pepi Grdzelitsinda or პეპი მაღალიწინდა Pepi Magalitsinda
- In German Pippilotta Viktualia Rollgardina Pfefferminz (book) or Schokominza (film) Efraimstochter Langstrumpf
- In Greek Πίπη η Φακιδομύτη = Pípī ī Fakidomýtī (literally "Pippi the freckle-nosed girl")
- In Hebrew בילבי בת-גרב Bilbi Bat-Gerev or גילגי Gilgi or the phonetic matching בילבי לא-כלום bílbi ló khlum, literally "Bilby Nothing" in old translations
- In Hungarian Harisnyás Pippi
- In Icelandic Lína Langsokkur
- In Indonesian Pippilotta Viktualia Gorden Tirai Permen Efraimputri Langstrump
- In Irish Pippi Longstocking
- In Italian Pippi Calzelunghe
- In Japanese 長くつ下のピッピ Nagakutsushita no Pippi
- In Karelian Peppi Pitküsukku
- In Khmer ពីពីស្រោមជើងវែង
- In Korean 말괄량이 소녀 삐삐 Malgwallyang-i Sonyeo Ppippi
- In Kurdish Pippi-Ya Goredirey
- In Latvian Pepija Garzeķe
- In Lithuanian Pepė Ilgakojinė
- In Macedonian Пипи долгиот чорап Pipi dolgot chorap
- In Mongolian Урт Оймст Пиппи Urt Oimst Pippi
- In Norwegian Pippi Langstrømpe
- In Persian پیپی جوراببلنده Pipi Jôrâb-Bolandeh
- In Polish Pippi Pończoszanka or Fizia Pończoszanka
- In Portuguese Píppi Meialonga (Brazil), Pipi das Meias Altas (Portugal)
- In Romanian Pippi Șosețica (Romania), Pepi Ciorap-Lung (Moldova)
- In Russian Пеппи Длинный Чулок Peppi Dlinnyj Chulok or Пеппи Длинныйчулок Peppi Dlinnyjchulok
- In Scottish Gaelic Pippi Fhad-stocainneach
- In Scots Pippi Langstoking
- In Slovak full Pipilota Viktuália Roleta Zlatka Efraimová Dlhá Pančucha or short Pipi Dlhá Pančucha
- In Slovene Pika Nogavička
- In Spanish Pipi Calzaslargas (Spain), Pippi Mediaslargas or Pippa Mediaslargas (Latin America)
- In Sinhala: දිගමේස්දානලාගේ පිප්පි Digamēsdānalāgē Pippi
- In Thai ปิ๊ปปี้ ถุงเท้ายาว Bpíp-bpîi Tǔng-Táo-Yaao
- In Turkish Pippi Uzunçorap
- In Ukrainian Пеппі Довгапанчоха Peppi Dovhapanchokha
- In Urdu Pippī Lambemoze
- In Vietnamese Pippi Tất Dài
- In Welsh Pippi Hosan-hir
- In Yiddish פּיפּפּי לאָנגסטאָקקינג Pippi Longstokking

== Cultural impact ==
Pippi Longstocking quickly became popular in Sweden upon publication, and by the end of the 1940s, 300,000 copies had been sold, saving Rabén and Sjögren from impending financial ruin. This was partially due to Olenius's marketing: she ensured that the book was frequently read to a radio audience, as well as helping to put on a popular adaptation of the book at her children's theatre at Medborgarhuset, Stockholm, in March 1946, for which only a library card was required for admission. This performance also toured other Swedish cities, including Norrköping, Gothenburg, and Eskilstuna. Another factor in the book's success was two positive reviews by the influential Swedish critics of children's culture, Eva von Zweigbergk and Greta Bolin, writing for Dagens Nyheter and Svenska Dagbladet, respectively; they praised the main character as "a liberatory force". Zweigbergk wrote that Pippi could provide an outlet for regular children who do not have the considerable freedom she possesses, with which Bolin agreed, remarking that Pippi's humor and antics would also appeal to adults for the same reason.

Subsequent reviews of Pippi Longstocking echoed the general opinions of von Zweigbergk and Bolin towards the book, until John Landquist's criticism in an August 1946 piece published in Aftonbladet, titled "BAD AND PRIZEWINNING". Landquist, who worked as a professor at Lund University, argued that the book was badly done, harmful to children, and that Pippi herself was mentally disturbed. Further criticism of Pippi's supposedly "unnatural" and harmful behavior followed in an article in the teachers' magazine Folkskollärarnas Tidning and in readers' letters to magazines. This debate over Pippi's performance of childhood coloured the reviews of the sequel Pippi Goes On Board (October 1946), some of which responded to Landquist's argument within the review itself. Regardless, Pippi continued to maintain her popularity and was featured in a range of merchandising, adaptations, and advertising.

In 1950, Pippi Longstocking was translated into American English by Viking Books, (Note: Historically, translations of children's literature have comprised a very small share of the market in the United States.) featuring Louis Glanzman's artwork. It did not become a bestseller, although sales did eventually improve after the initial release; more than five million copies had been sold by 2000. Pippi was positively received by American reviewers, who did not find her behavior "subversive" or problematic, but rather "harmless" and entertaining. Eva-Maria Metcalf has argued that Pippi was subject to a "double distancing" as both a foreign character and one believed to be nonsensical, thus minimizing her potentially subversive actions that had stirred the minor controversy earlier in Sweden. As a result of Pippi and Lindgren's growing recognition in the United States, Pippi's behavior in later books became more critically scrutinized by literary critics, some of whom were less sure of the "hilarious nonsensical behavior, the goodness of her heart, and the freedom of her spirit" that had been lauded in earlier reviews. Reviewers of Pippi in the South Seas in The Horn Book Magazine and The Saturday Review found Pippi to be less charming than in earlier books, with The Saturday Review describing her as "noisy and rude and unfunny".

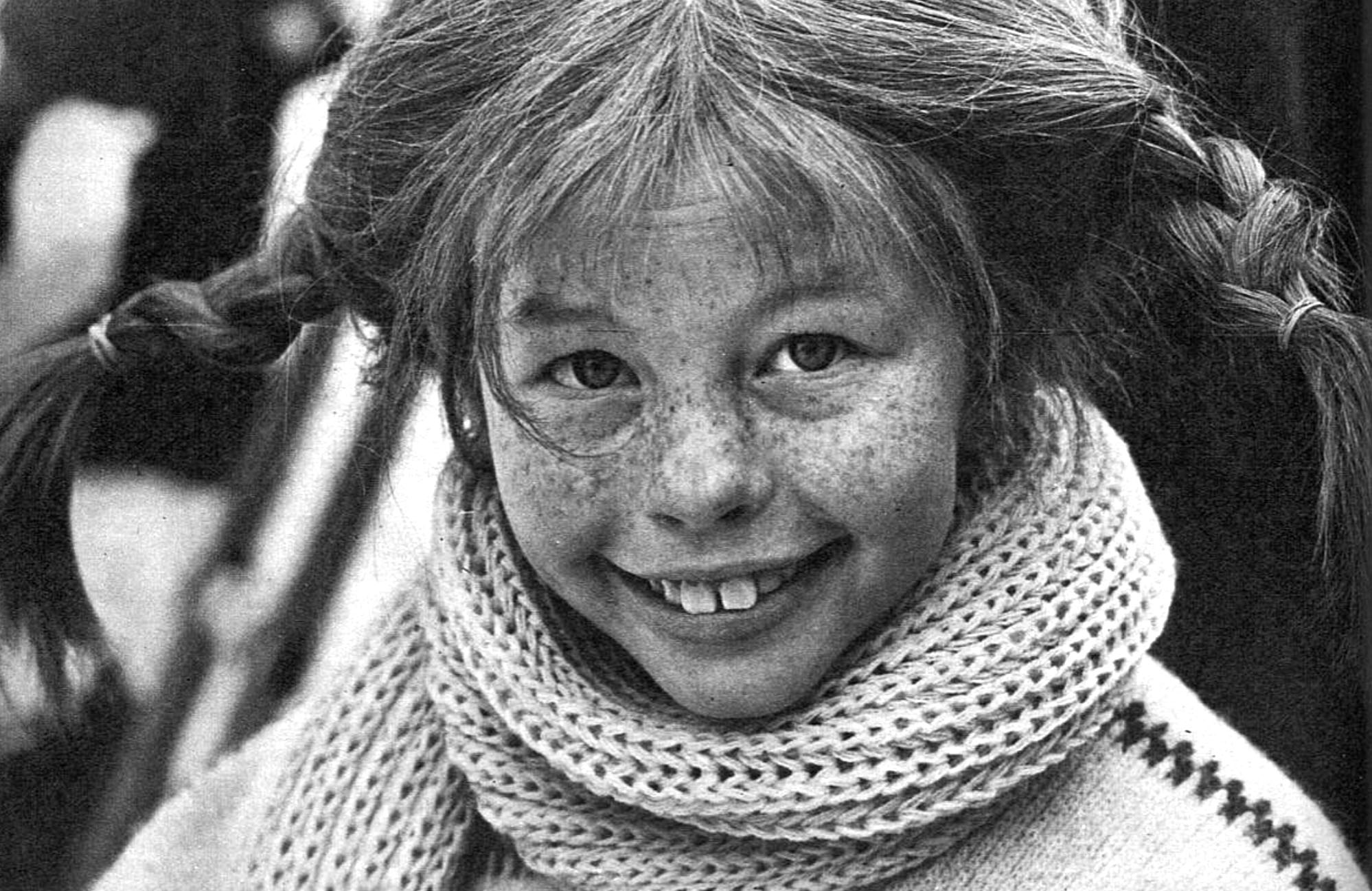
Inger Nilsson as Pippi Longstocking

An influential television adaptation of Pippi Longstocking debuted on 8 February 1969 in Sweden, and was broadcast for thirteen weeks, during which it acquired a considerable following. It was directed by Olle Hellbom, who later directed other adaptations of Lindgren's works. Inger Nilsson starred as Pippi, and upon the broadcast of the television series, she became a celebrity along with her co-stars Pär Sundberg and Maria Persson, who played Tommy and Annika respectively. In this adaptation Pippi's horse that is unnamed in the novels was called Lilla Gubben (Little Old Man). As a result of Lindgren's considerable unhappiness with the lesser-known Swedish film adaptation of Pippi Longstocking (1949), she wrote the screenplay for the television adaptation, which stuck more closely to the narrative of the books than the film had. Scholar Christine Anne Holmlund briefly discussed the difference she found between the two iterations of Pippi, namely that Viveca Serlachius's portrayal of Pippi sometimes took on middle-class sensibilities in a way that other iterations of Pippi had not, for example, purchasing a piano in one scene only to show it off in Villa Villakula. In contrast, the Pippi of Hellbom's television series and subsequent tie-in 1970 films, Pippi in the South Seas and Pippi on the Run, is an "abnormal, even otherworldly," periodically gender-defying bohemian reminiscent of Swedish hippies. Holmlund argued that both Gunvall and Hellbom's adaptations depict her as a "lovably eccentric girl".

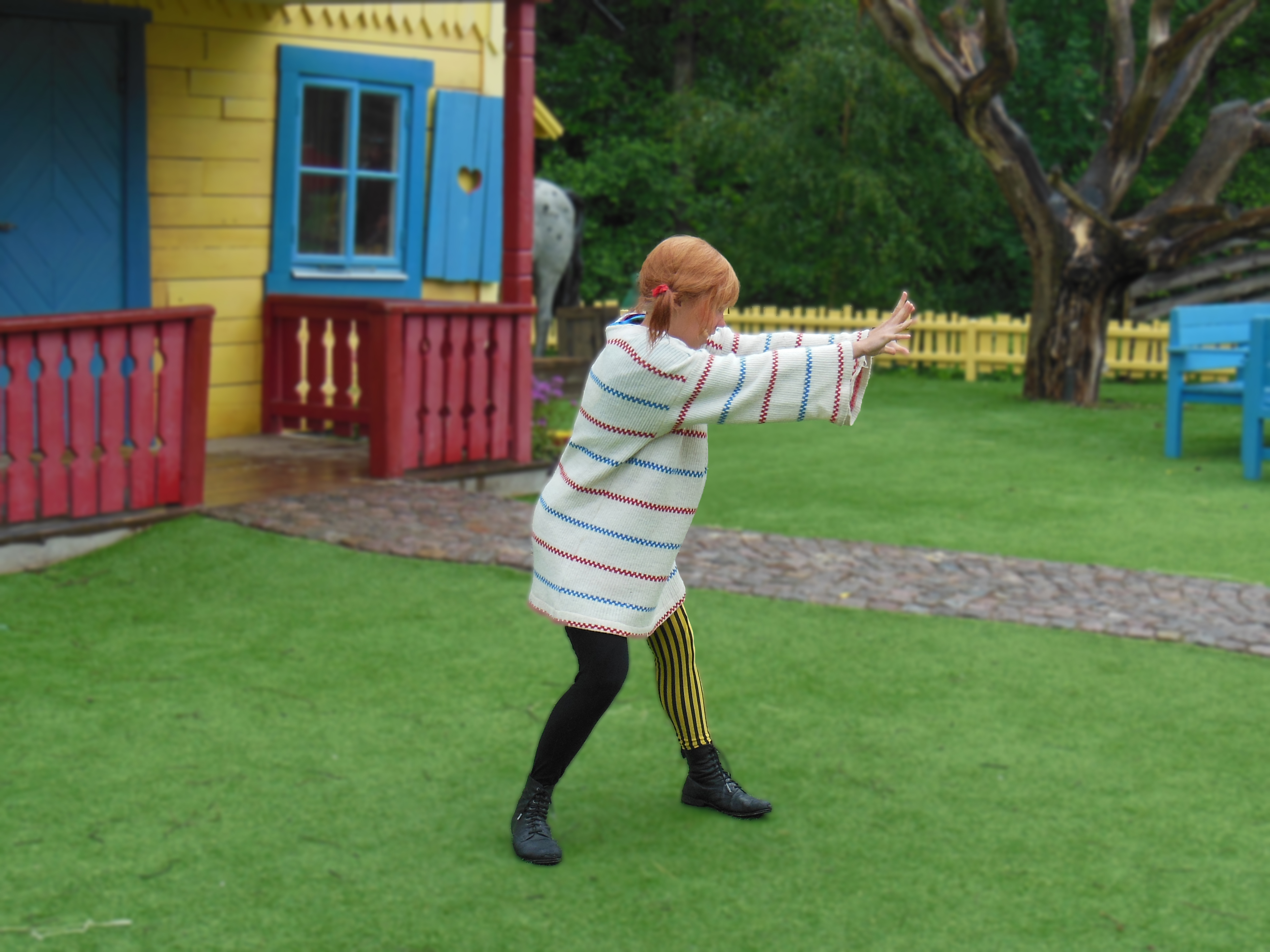
An actress portrays Pippi in front of a scale model of Villa Villekulla at Astrid Lindgren's World.

In the twenty-first century, Pippi has continued to maintain her popularity, often placing on lists of favorite characters from children's literature or feminist characters. She is regarded as the most well-known of Lindgren's creations, and appears as a character in Astrid Lindgren's World, a theme park in Vimmerby, Sweden, dedicated to Lindgren's works, and on the obverse of the Swedish 20 kronor note, as issued by Riksbank. Additionally, Pika's Festival, a children's festival in Slovenia, borrows its name from her. Pippi has also inspired other literary creations: for his character Lisbeth Salander in the Millennium series, Stieg Larsson was inspired by his idea of what Pippi might have been like as an adult. Pippi has continued to remain popular with critics, who often cite her freedom as part of her appeal. The Independent's Paul Binding described her as "not simply a girl boldly doing boys' things," but rather "[i]n her panache and inventiveness she appeals to the longings, the secret psychic demands of girls and boys, and indeed has happily united them in readership all over the world." Susanna Forest of The Telegraph called Pippi "still outrageous and contemporary" and "the ultimate imaginary friend to run along rooftops and beat up the bad guys." In 100 Best Books for Children, Anita Silvey praised the character as "the perfect fantasy heroine — one who lives without supervision but with endless money to execute her schemes."

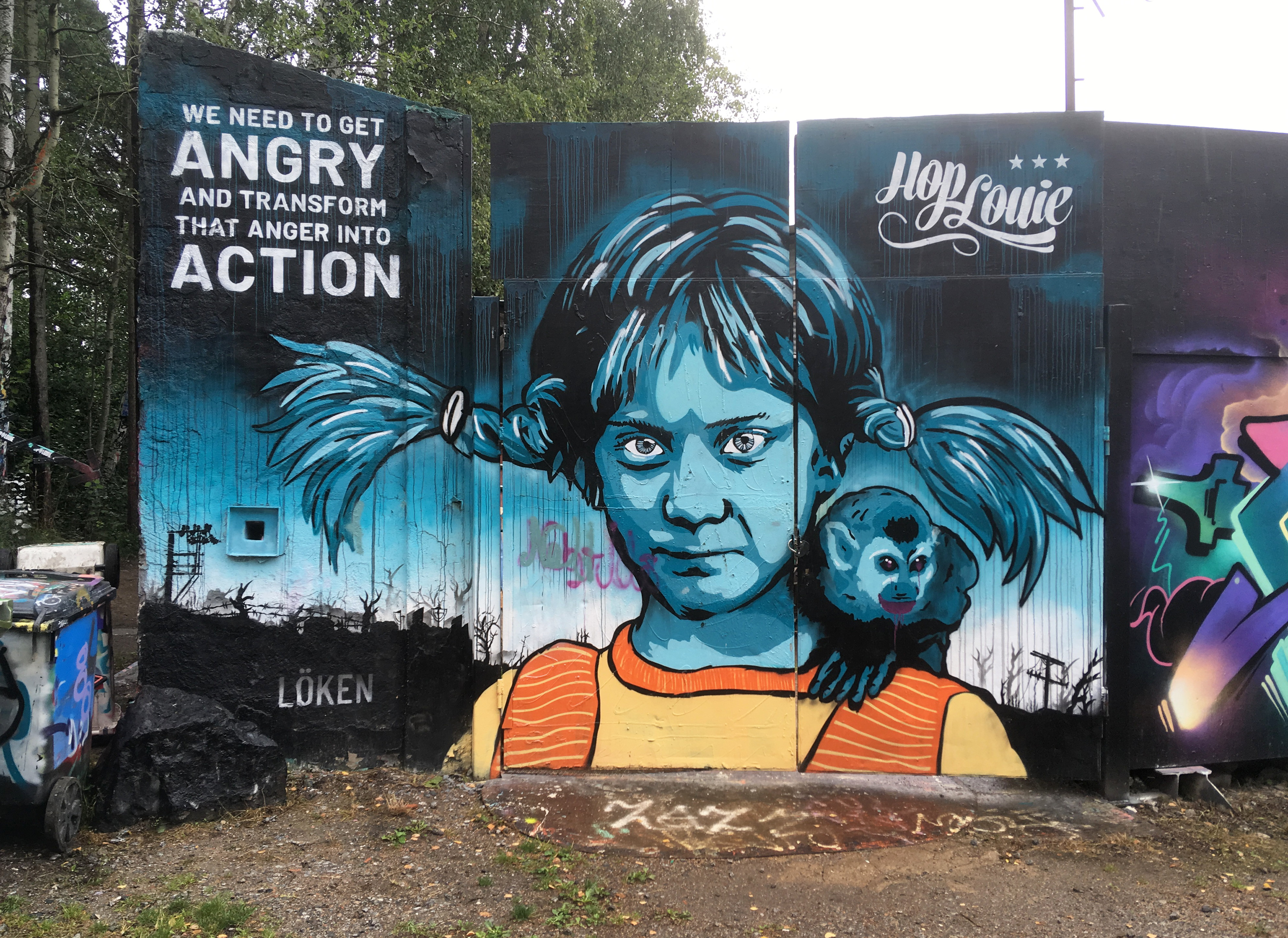
Greta Thunberg as Pippi Longstocking

Pippi has been subject to censorship in translations. A censored edition of Pippi Longstocking appeared in France, with changes made to her character to make her "a fine young lady" instead of "a strange, maladjusted child". Additionally, the publisher, Hachette, thought that Pippi's ability to lift a horse would seem unrealistic to French child readers, and thus changed the horse to a pony. In response to this change, Lindgren requested that the publisher give her a photo of a real French girl lifting a pony, as that child would have a "secure" weightlifting career. Sara Van den Bossche has hypothesized that the lack of controversy as a result of the censorship might be why Pippi Longstocking went mainly unremarked upon in France, whereas in Germany and Sweden, the book quickly became accepted within the countries' respective children's literature canon, even as it stirred controversy over its "anti-authoritarian tendencies". In 1995, an uncensored version of Pippi Longstocking was released in France, which "shook" French readers, although the book did not reach the cultural status as it had in Germany and Sweden.

The character has also centered in debates about how to handle potentially offensive racial language in children's literature. In 2014, the Swedish public broadcaster SVT edited the 1969 television adaptation of Pippi Longstocking with the approval of Astrid Lindgren's heirs: the first edit removed Pippi's reference to her father as "King of the Negroes," a term now offensive in Sweden; (Note: Publisher Friedrich Oetinger had also revised the German translation of Pippi Longstocking in 2009, removing a reference to Pippi's father as "Negro King" in favor of the "South Sea King". In Sweden, the term remained in the books, with a preface noting that the accepted language and terminology used to describe people of African ancestry had changed over the years.) and the second eliminated Pippi slanting her eyes, although it kept her pretending to sing in "Chinese". These changes received a backlash: of the first 25,000 Swedish readers polled by the Aftonbladet on Facebook, eighty-one percent disagreed with the idea of removing outdated racial language and notions from Pippi Longstocking, and the columnist Erik Helmerson of Dagens Nyheter labelled the changes as censorship. One of Lindgren's grandchildren, Nils Nyman, defended the edits, arguing that to not do so might have diluted Pippi's message of female empowerment.

== Pippi books in Swedish and English ==
The three main Pippi Longstocking books were published first in Swedish and later in English:

- Pippi Långstrump, illustrated by Ingrid Nyman (Stockholm, 1945), first published in English as Pippi Longstocking, translated by Florence Lamborn, illustrated by Louis S. Glanzman (New York, 1950)
- Pippi Långstrump går ombord, illustrated by Ingrid Nyman (Stockholm, 1946), translated as Pippi Goes on Board, translated by Florence Lamborn and illustrated by Louis S. Glanzman (New York, 1957)
- Pippi Långstrump i Söderhavet (Stockholm, 1948), illustrated by Ingrid Nyman, first published in English as Pippi in the South Seas (New York, 1959), translated by Gerry Bothmer and illustrated by Louis S. Glanzman

There are also a number of additional Pippi stories, some just in Swedish, others in both Swedish and English:

- Pippi Långstrump har julgransplundring, a picture book first published in Swedish in the Christmas edition of Allers Magazine in 1948, later published in book form in 1979, illustrated by Ingrid Nyman. It was first published in English in 1996 as Pippi Longstocking's After-Christmas Party, translated by Stephen Keeler and illustrated by Michael Chesworth.
- Pippi flyttar in, illustrated by Ingrid Vang Nyman, was first published in Swedish as a picture book in 1969, and appeared as a comic book in 1992. Translated by Tiina Nunnally, it was published in English as Pippi Moves In in 2012.
- Pippi Långstrump i Humlegården, a picture book illustrated by Ingrid Nyman, published in Swedish in 2000. It was published in English in April 2001 as Pippi Longstocking in the Park, illustrated by Ingrid Nyman.
- Pippi ordnar allt (1969), translated as Pippi Fixes Everything (2010)

Other books in Swedish include:

- Känner du Pippi Långstrump? (1947)
- Sjung med Pippi Långstrump (1949)
- Pippi håller kalas (1970)
- Pippi är starkast i världen (1970)
- Pippi går till sjöss (1971)
- Pippi vill inte bli stor (1971)
- Pippi Långstrump på Kurrekurreduttön (2004)
- Pippi hittar en spunk (2008)
- Pippi går i affärer (2014)

== Pippi in films ==
- Pippi Långstrump (1949)
- Pippi Longstocking (1961)
- Pippi Longstocking (1969)
- Pippi Goes on Board (1969)
- Pippi in the South Seas (1970)
- Pippi on the Run (1970)
- Peppi Dlinnyychulok (1984)
- The New Adventures of Pippi Longstocking (1988)
- Pippi Longstocking (1997) (animated)
- Pippi's Adventures on the South Seas (1999) (animated)
- Untitled CGI animated series (TBA)
