= Pippi Longstocking (1969 TV series) =

- TV Series (1969) DVD cover
- Written by: Astrid Lindgren; Olle Hellbom
- Directed by: Olle Hellbom
- Starring: Inger Nilsson; Maria Persson; Pär Sundberg
- Theme music composer: Jan Johansson
- Opening theme: Here Comes Pippi Longstocking
- Composer: Georg Riedel Konrad Elfers (German cut) Chrisitan Bruhn (German cut)
- Countries of origin: Sweden; West Germany
- Original language: Swedish
- No. of episodes: 13 (21 in the German cut)

Production
- Producer: Olle Nordemar
- Cinematography: Kalle Bergholm
- Editor: Jan Persson
- Running time: 27 minutes
- Production companies: Nord Art AB; Sveriges Radio AB; Svensk Filmindustri; BetaFilm; Hessischer Rundfunk; IdunaFilm Produktiongesellschaft; ORF

Original release
- Network: Sverige Radio TV1 (Sweden); Deutsches Fernsehen (West Germany); ORF FS1 (Austria)
- Release: 8 February – 3 May 1969

Pippi Longstocking (Swedish: Pippi Långstrump) is a Swedish/West German TV series based on Astrid Lindgren's Pippi Longstocking children's books. The show ran for thirteen episodes, the first episode being broadcast 8 February 1969 on Sveriges Television.

The series' theme song, "Here Comes Pippi Longstocking" ("Här Kommer Pippi Långstrump") was composed by Jan Johansson (in one of his last works, before his death a year before the series aired), with lyrics by Astrid Lindgren. The song was sung by series star Inger Nilsson.

== English-language film version ==
In 1969, the Swedish series was re-edited into two German-dubbed feature films by Beta Film, which was one of the German co-producers of the TV series (and was the distributor in all territories outside of Sweden). When released in English-dubbed form in the United States by G.G. Communications, they became weekend television staples in several cities in America throughout the 1970s and 1980s. Additionally, the two original feature film sequels from 1970, which featured the same cast and crew, were also dubbed in English for USA distribution.

The re-edited TV-series feature films are:

- Pippi Longstocking (German title: Pippi Langstrumpf) (1969) (USA release 1973)
- Pippi Goes on Board (German title: Pippi geht von Bord, Swedish title: Här kommer Pippi Långstrump) (1969) (USA release 1975)

The feature film sequels are:

- Pippi in the South Seas (Swedish title: Pippi Långstrump på de sju haven) (1970) (USA release 1975)
- Pippi on the Run (Swedish title: På rymmen med Pippi Långstrump) (1970) (USA release 1977)

The first six uncut episodes of the original series, newly dubbed in English using British actors, and remastered from new film prints, became available on DVD in 2002 by Hen's Tooth Video and Junior.TV GmbH & Co. KG.

== Location ==
The Swedish town where the show is set is Visby in Gotland, the largest island in the Baltic Sea and the location of the fictional Villa Villekulla.

== Episodes ==
1. "Pippi flyttar in i Villa Villekulla" (Pippi Moves into Villa Villekulla) (Aired: 8 February 1969)
2. "Pippi är sakletare och går på kalas" (Pippi is a Thing-Finder and Goes to a Party") (Aired: 15 February 1969)
3. "Pippi går i affärer" ("Pippi Goes Shopping") (Aired: 22 February 1969)
4. "Pippi ordnar en utflykt" ("Pippi Arranges a Trip") (Aired: 1 March 1969)
5. "Pippi får besök av tjuvar" ("Pippi is Visited by Thieves") (Aired: 8 March 1969)
6. "Pippi går på tivoli" ("Pippi Goes to the Amusement Park") (Aired: 15 March 1969)
7. "Pippi i den första snön" ("Pippi and the First Snow") (Aired: 22 March 1969)
8. "Pippis jul" ("Pippi's Christmas") (Aired: 29 March 1969)
9. "Pippi hittar en spunk" ("Pippi Finds a 'Spunk'") (Aired: 5 April 1969)
10. "Pippis ballongfärd" ("Pippi's Balloon Ride") (Aired: 12 April 1969)
11. "Pippi är skeppsbruten" ("Pippi is Shipwrecked") (Aired: 19 April 1969)
12. "Pippi håller avskedskalas" ("Pippi Has a Farewell Party") (Aired: 26 April 1969)
13. "Pippi går ombord" ("Pippi Goes on Board") (Aired: 3 May 1969)

For the German cut of the series aired on Das Erste (which have been distributed in all the countries outside Sweden), 8 additional episodes were added, splitting the two original feature films in four parts each. Lots of outtake footage not seen even in Sweden were also added to patch up the running time.

1. "Pippi Langstrumpf und die Seeräuber – Teil 1" (Pippi Longstocking and the Pirates – Part 1) (Aired: 6 February 1972)
2. "Pippi Langstrumpf und die Seeräuber – Teil 2" (Pippi Longstocking and the Pirates – Part 2) (Aired: 13 February 1972)
3. "Pippi Langstrumpf und die Seeräuber – Teil 3" (Pippi Longstocking and the Pirates – Part 3) (Aired: 20 February 1972)
4. "Pippi Langstrumpf und die Seeräuber – Teil 4" (Pippi Longstocking and the Pirates – Part 4) (Aired: 27 February 1972)
5. "Mit Pippi Langstrumpf auf der Walz – Teil 1" (With Pippi Longstocking on the Roll – Part 1) (Aired: 5 March 1972)
6. "Mit Pippi Langstrumpf auf der Walz – Teil 2" (With Pippi Longstocking on the Roll – Part 2) (Aired: 12 March 1972)
7. "Mit Pippi Langstrumpf auf der Walz – Teil 3" (With Pippi Longstocking on the Roll – Part 3) (Aired: 19 March 1972)
8. "Mit Pippi Langstrumpf auf der Walz – Teil 4" (With Pippi Longstocking on the Roll – Part 4) (Aired: 26 March 1972)

== Cast ==
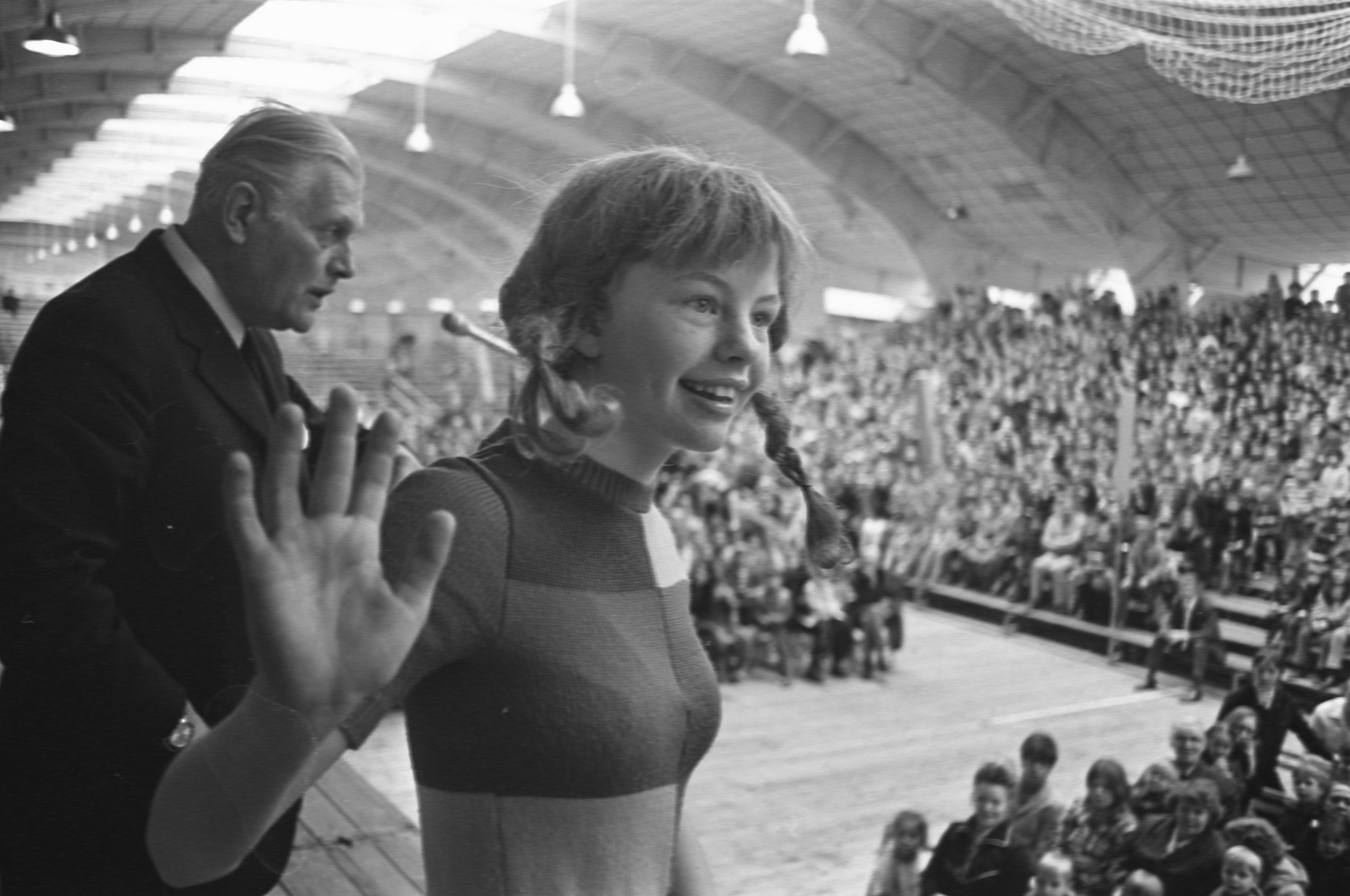
12-year-old Inger Nilsson as Pippi Longstocking at a 1972 performance in Amsterdam. This is a few years after she starred in the television series.

- Inger Nilsson as Pippi Longstocking
- Pär Sundberg as Tommy Settergren
- Maria Persson as Annika Settergren
- Beppe Wolgers as Captain Efraim Longstocking
- Margot Trooger as Mrs. Prysselius
- Hans Clarin as Thunder-Karlsson
- Paul Esser as Bloom
- Ulf G. Johnsson as Kling
- Göthe Grefbo as Klang
- Fredrik Ohlsson as Mr. Settergren
- Öllegård Wellton as Mrs. Settergren
- Staffan Hallerstam as Benke
- Martin Ljung as Messer-Jocke
- Jarl Borssén as Blood-Svente
- Hans Alfredson as Konrad
- Wolfgang Völz as pirate Oskar
