= Jan Nygren =

Swedish actor (1934–2019)

- Born: 10 April 1934; Ljusdal, Sweden
- Died: 28 November 2019 (aged 85); Danderyd, Sweden
- Occupation: actor

Jan Nils Johan Nygren (10 April 1934 – 28 November 2019) was a Swedish actor, well known for his role as Karlsson (Karlsson's voice) in Karlsson-on-the-Roof.

== Selected filmography ==
- 1973 - Emil och griseknoen
- 1973 - Någonstans i Sverige (TV)
- 1974 - Världens bästa Karlsson (as Karlsson-on-the-Roof's voice)
- 1975 - Egg! Egg! A Hardboiled Story
- 1977 - Bröderna Lejonhjärta
- 1979 - Du är inte klok, Madicken
- 1980 - Sverige åt svenskarna
- 1981 - Babels hus (TV)
- 1982 - Jönssonligan & Dynamit-Harry
- 1983 - Profitörerna (TV)
- 1985 - Peter-No-Tail in Americat
- 1986 - Hassel – Beskyddarna
- 1988 - Kråsnålen (TV)
- 1991 - "Harry Lund" lägger näsan i blöt!
- 1991 - Den ofrivillige golfaren

- 1993 - Sökarna
- 1994 - Den vite riddaren (TV)
- 1996 - Monopol
