= Louis Glanzman =

American artist and book illustrator (1922–2013)

Louis S. "Lew" Glanzman (February 8, 1922 – July 7, 2013) was an American artist and book illustrator, probably best known as the illustrator of the first English language translations of the Pippi Longstocking books, in 1950.

Glanzman was born in Baltimore, Maryland and grew up in Virginia. His brother is fellow artist Sam Glanzman. He trained at the School of Industrial Arts in New York City.

He died on July 7, 2013.
