= Göthe Grefbo =

Swedish actor

- Born: 30 October 1921; Föllinge, Sweden
- Died: 17 May 1991 (aged 69); Stockholm, Sweden
- Occupation: Actor
- Years active: 1948-1989

Göthe Grefbo (30 October 1921 – 17 May 1991) was a Swedish actor. He appeared in more than 70 films and television shows between 1948 and 1989.

== Selected filmography ==
- Janne Vängmans bravader (1948) - Railroad worker (uncredited)
- Eva (1948) - Ticket Collector (uncredited)
- Janne Vängman på nya äventyr (1949) - Enok Holm
- Two Stories Up (1950) - Salvation Army Lieutenant
- Restaurant Intim (1950) - Restaurant guest (uncredited)
- Regementets ros (1950) - Chief of guards (uncredited)
- Defiance (1952) - Young man (uncredited)
- Farlig kurva (1952) - Frasse Svensson
- Summer with Monika (1953) - Lagerarbetare hos Forsbergs
- Barabbas (1953) - Man at Christian Meeting (uncredited)
- The Road to Klockrike (1953) - Emigrant som tas av polisen (uncredited)
- We Three Debutantes (1953) - Janitor at Svensk Plåtemalj (uncredited)
- Stupid Bom (1953) - Pettersson, city accountant
- Dance in the Smoke (1954) - Constable
- Wild Birds (1955) - Gang Member (uncredited)
- Friarannonsen (1955) - Poliskonstapel
- Den glade skomakaren (1955) - Janitor (uncredited)
- Lady & the Tramp (1955) - Dachsie (Swedish dub)
- Night Child (1956) - Machine Operator (uncredited)
- The Staffan Stolle Story (1956) - Tolk
- More Than a Match for the Navy (1958) - Waiter
- The Jazz Boy (1958) - Teddys reklamchef
- Musik ombord (1958) - Kypare
- Fröken Chic (1959) - Teacher (uncredited)
- Swinging at the Castle (1959) - Erik Borg (uncredited)
- Crime in Paradise (1959) - Doorman (uncredited)
- Bara en kypare (1959) - Guest at Railroad Hotel Restaurant (uncredited)
- Svenska Floyd (1961) - Agent
- Rififi in Stockholm (1961) - Porter (uncredited)
- Min kära är en ros (1963)
- Badarna (1968) - Supervisor
- The Bookseller Gave Up Bathing (1969) - Priest
- Pippi Longstocking (1969) - Police constable Klang
- Eva - den utstötta (1969) - Gustav Bolinder
- Ni ljuger (1969) - Prison guard (uncredited)
- Pippi Goes on Board (1969) - Policeman Klang
- Dagmars Heta Trosor (1971) - Harold Hansen
- Lockfågeln (1971) - Lövgren
- Firmafesten (1972) - Karl-Ivar Pettersson, economic manager
- Emil och griseknoen (1973) - Kråkstorparen
- Bröllopet (1973) - Ivan Snell
- En enkel melodi (1974) - Patient
- What the Swedish Butler Saw (1975) - Judge Pettibone
- Bel Ami (1976) - Mr. Potts
- The Brothers Lionheart (1977) - Tengil's Guard
- Sverige åt svenskarna (1980) - Swedish army captain
- Barna från Blåsjöfjället (1980) - Manne
- Raskenstam (1983) - Josef
- Kalabaliken i Bender (1983)
- Morrhår & ärtor (1986) - Hundman
- I lagens namn (1986) - Janitor
- Enkel resa (1988) - Steward
