= Pippi on the Run =

- Swedish theatrical release poster
- Directed by: Olle Hellbom
- Written by: Astrid Lindgren (novel and screenplay)
- Produced by: Olle Nordemar
- Starring: Inger Nilsson; Maria Persson; Pär Sundberg
- Edited by: Jan Persson; Jutta Schweden
- Music by: Georg Riedel
- Production companies: Nord Art AB; Beta Film; Iduna Film Produktiongesellschaft
- Distributed by: Svensk Filmindustri (Sweden); Constantin Film (West Germany)
- Release date: November 14, 1970 (Sweden)
- Running time: 93 min.
- Countries: Sweden; West Germany
- Language: Swedish

Pippi on the Run (original Swedish title: På rymmen med Pippi Långstrump) is a 1970 Swedish/West German film, sequel of Pippi in the South Seas with the cast of the 1969 TV series Pippi Longstocking. It is the last entry in the original TV and movie series and the only one to not be based on any of the previous books written by Astrid Lindgren. Lindgren eventually wrote a book adaptation of the movie. It was released in the US in 1977.

== Plot ==
Fed up with their strict parents after receiving a severe punishment, Tommy and Annika run away from home, with their friend Pippi Longstocking to look after them in their long trek.

== Cast ==
- Inger Nilsson – Pippi Longstocking
- Pär Sundberg – Tommy
- Maria Persson – Annika
- Hans Alfredson – Konrad the peddler
- Öllegård Wellton – Tommy and Annika's mother
- Fredrik Ohlsson – Tommy and Annika's father

== See also ==
- Pippi Longstocking – The character
- Pippi Longstocking – The TV series
