= Staffan Hallerstam =

Swedish actor and physician

- Born: 21 May 1957 (age 67); Stockholm, Sweden
- Occupation: Actor

Staffan Hallerstam (born 21 May 1957 in Stockholm) is a Swedish actor and physician. He is the father of Leo Hallerstam.

When Hallerstam became an adult, he participated in various theatrical productions, including Gamle Adam and Min käre man at Vasateatern in Stockholm, as well as Bamse at Fria teatern in Högdalen in Stockholm. During the 1980s and 1990s, Hallerstam dubbed voices for cartoons, in particular Duck Tales, where he dubbed the voices of Huey, Dewey and Louie until Monica Forsberg took over. After that, he became a doctor and is still one today.

== Filmography ==
- 1995 – Casper (voice)
- 1994 - Sonic the Hedgehog (voice)
- 1993 – Adventures of Sonic the Hedgehog (voice)
- 1992 – Biker Mice from Mars (voice)
- 1992 – Dog City (voice)
- 1990 - The Rescuers Down Under (voice)
- 1986 - Silver Fang (voice)
- 1982 - Zoombie
- 1981 - Operation Leo
- 1974 - Världens bästa Karlsson
- 1972 - The Man Who Quit Smoking
- 1970 - Pippi in the South Seas
- 1969 - Pippi Longstocking
- 1969 – Kråkguldet
- 1967 – Kullamannen
