= Pippi in the South Seas (film) =

- DVD cover
- Directed by: Olle Hellbom
- Written by: Astrid Lindgren (novel); Olle Hellbom (screenplay)
- Produced by: Olle Nordemar
- Starring: Inger Nilsson; Maria Persson; Pär Sundberg
- Edited by: Jan Persson
- Music by: Georg Riedel; Jan Johansson
- Production companies: Nord Art AB; Beta Film; Iduna Film Produktiongesellschaft
- Distributed by: Svensk Filmindustri (Sweden); Jugendfilm (West Germany)
- Release date: 24 January 1970 (Sweden)
- Running time: 86 minutes
- Countries: Sweden; West Germany
- Language: Swedish

Pippi in the South Seas (original Swedish title: Pippi Långstrump på de sju haven) is a 1970 Swedish/West German film, loosely based on the eponymous children's book by Astrid Lindgren and sequel of the 1969 TV series Pippi Longstocking. The movie was followed by Pippi on the Run, released later in the same year. It was released in the US in 1974.

== Synopsis ==
The Settergens leave their children Annika and Tommy at Pippi's house for three weeks. During a trip to the lake, the children find a message in a bottle from Pippi's father, Captain Longstocking, who is calling for help because he is trapped by the pirate Blut-Svente and his crew in a tower on the island of Port Piluse. Pippi and her friends decide to set off using a "Myskodil" invented by the main character, a bed transformed into a hot air balloon. However, the Myskodil runs out of air along the way, so the bed remains on top of a mountain while the balloon floats away. The children continue on foot to a rubbish dump. There, with some crates, a propeller and an old bicycle, they build a strange pedal plane that is steered with a rudder, with which they head towards Port Piluse. During the journey the wreck breaks and risks falling into an erupting volcano, but it crashes onto an uninhabited island where the kids camp for a day.

The next morning a ship passes by the island. Pippi decides to spy on the crew and discovers that they want to steal her father's treasure. With an excuse she manages to get the pirates off the ship and takes command, making her friends get on board as well. They finally reach Port Piluse, where the Blut-Svente pirates are holding Captain Longstocking prisoner, trying to make him reveal where his treasure is. He always refuses to talk, saying that his daughter Pippi will come and save him. The pirates, however, do not believe him, thinking that a little girl cannot be strong enough to defeat them.

Meanwhile, Pippi is forced to fight to free her father. She also finds herself forced to hide Tommy and Annika; so she asks for help from Marko, a foreign boy who works at Port Piluse's tavern, offering him some gold coins. Soon the girl begins to be feared by the pirates themselves, who have understood that Pippi is really strong and very determined.

The latter manages to find her father and offers him some delicious food, since the man was forced to eat only bread and water. After being discovered, Blut-Svente hides Captain Longstocking in the dungeon of the fortress. However, he manages to send a message in a bottle to Pippi, who frees him by blowing up the walls of the fortress with gunpowder. Shortly before, the captain had told the crew the coordinates to find the treasure.

The children and the captain venture to the treasure island and manage to take it before Blut-Svente arrives. However, his men are already on the island and take Tommy and Annika hostage, and Pippi and her father have no choice but to hand over the treasure to the pirates. Unbeknownst to the pirates, the crew of the protagonist's father (previously confined by Blut-Svente and his sailors on the same island) takes advantage of the situation to take back the ship, leaving the pirates, terrified and desperate, on land with no way out. Pippi then gives them a manual for building a raft and an axe to cut down the trees needed for its construction, in exchange for the treasure chests. And so the adventure ends with the return to Villa Villekulla.

== Cast ==
- Inger Nilsson as Pippi Longstocking
- Maria Persson as Narrator/Annika
- Pär Sundberg as Tommy
- Beppe Wolgers as Captain Efraim Longstocking
- Martin Ljung as Jocke with the Knife
- Jarl Borssén as Blood-Svente
- Öllegård Wellton as Annika's and Tommy's Mother
- Fredrik Ohlsson as Annika's and Tommy's Father
- Staffan Hallerstam as Marko
- Tor Isedal as Pedro
- Håkan Serner as Franco
- Alfred Schieske as Pirate
- Wolfgang Völz as Oscar
- Nikolaus Schilling as Pirate
- Olle Nordemar as Pirate
- Gunnar Lantz as Pirate
- Carl Schwartz as Pirate
- Per Bakke as Pirate
- Kelvin Leonard as Pirate
- Ingemar Claesson as Pirate
- Olle Nyman as Pirate
- Nibbe Malmqvist as Pirate
- Åke Hartwig as Pirate
- Thor Heyerdahl as Pirate
- Arne Ragneborn as Pirate
- Douglas as Rosalinda (parrot)
