= Beppe Wolgers =

Swedish actor (1928–1986)

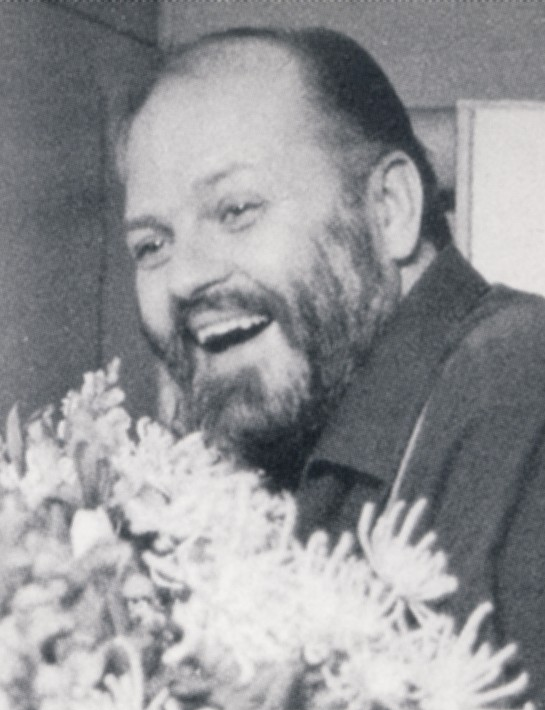
- Beppe Wolgers in April 1968
- Born: John Bertil Wolgers; 10 November 1928; Stockholm, Sweden
- Died: 6 August 1986 (aged 57); Östersund, Sweden
- Occupations: Author, poet, translator, lyricist, actor, entertainer, artist
- Years active: 1953–1986
- Spouse: Kerstin Dunér
- Children: 4

John Bertil "Beppe" Wolgers (10 November 1928 – 6 August 1986) was a Swedish author, poet, translator, lyricist, actor, entertainer and artist.

== Career ==
Wolgers was born in Stockholm, Sweden and was the son of forest ranger John Wolgers and Gerda (née Korsgren). He attended Germantown Friends School in Philadelphia, United States from 1947 to 1948 and Poppius journalistskola and Otte Skölds målarskola from 1946 to 1947. Wolgers was a journalist at Stockholms-Tidningen from 1960 to 1961.

Wolgers had also exhibits together with Ernfrid Bogstedt.

He wrote about a thousand songs and specialized in putting Swedish lyrics to foreign tunes like "Walkin' My Baby Back Home", "Waltz for Debby", "Dat Dere", "Eleanor Rigby", "Take Five" and "Bachianas brasileiras" no 5. He also made several books and films for children, and did a famous series as a slightly crazy goodnight story teller for children in Swedish television 1968–1974 and, as notable, the father of Pippi Longstocking in the 1969 TV series. In 1974, Wolgers and his son, Jens Wolgers, starred together in the Swedish family film, Dunderklumpen. He was also a voice actor, who voiced many characters from the Disney movies including Baloo from The Jungle Book with the exception of the songs. He died in Östersund from a peptic ulcer.

== Personal life ==
Wolgers was married to Kerstin Dunér (born 1932), the daughter of radio inspector Osborn Dunér and his wife. They had four children.
