= Inger Nilsson =

Swedish actress and singer (born 1959)

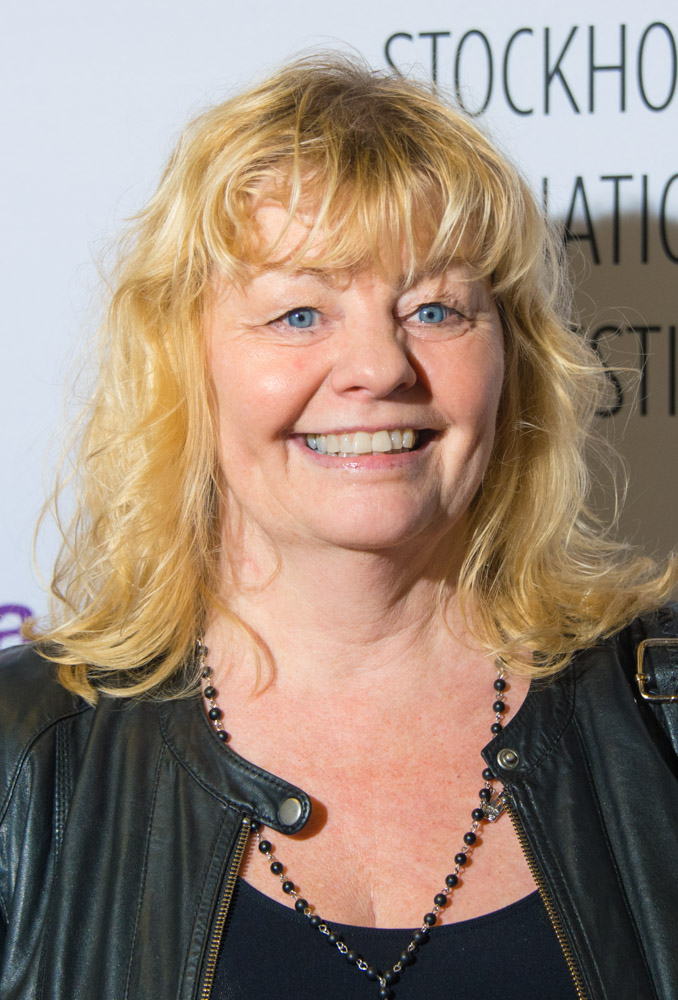
- Inger Nilsson during the Stockholm International Film Festival in November 2015
- Born: Karin Inger Monica Nilsson; 4 May 1959 (age 67); Kisa, Sweden
- Occupations: Actress; singer; medical secretary
- Years active: 1969–present
- Known for: Pippi Longstocking

Karin Inger Monica Nilsson (born 4 May 1959) is a Swedish actress and singer. She is a former child actress. She is primarily known for her portrayal of Pippi Longstocking in the Swedish-produced TV series of the same name during 1969 which was compiled, re-dubbed into German and later also in English and many other languages, and released as two feature films in 1969. In 1970, she reprised her role of Pippi in two feature films. In 2005, she was working as a secretary in Stockholm, occasionally taking small stage roles.

== Early life ==
She was born on 4 May 1959 in Kisa, Sweden.

== Career ==
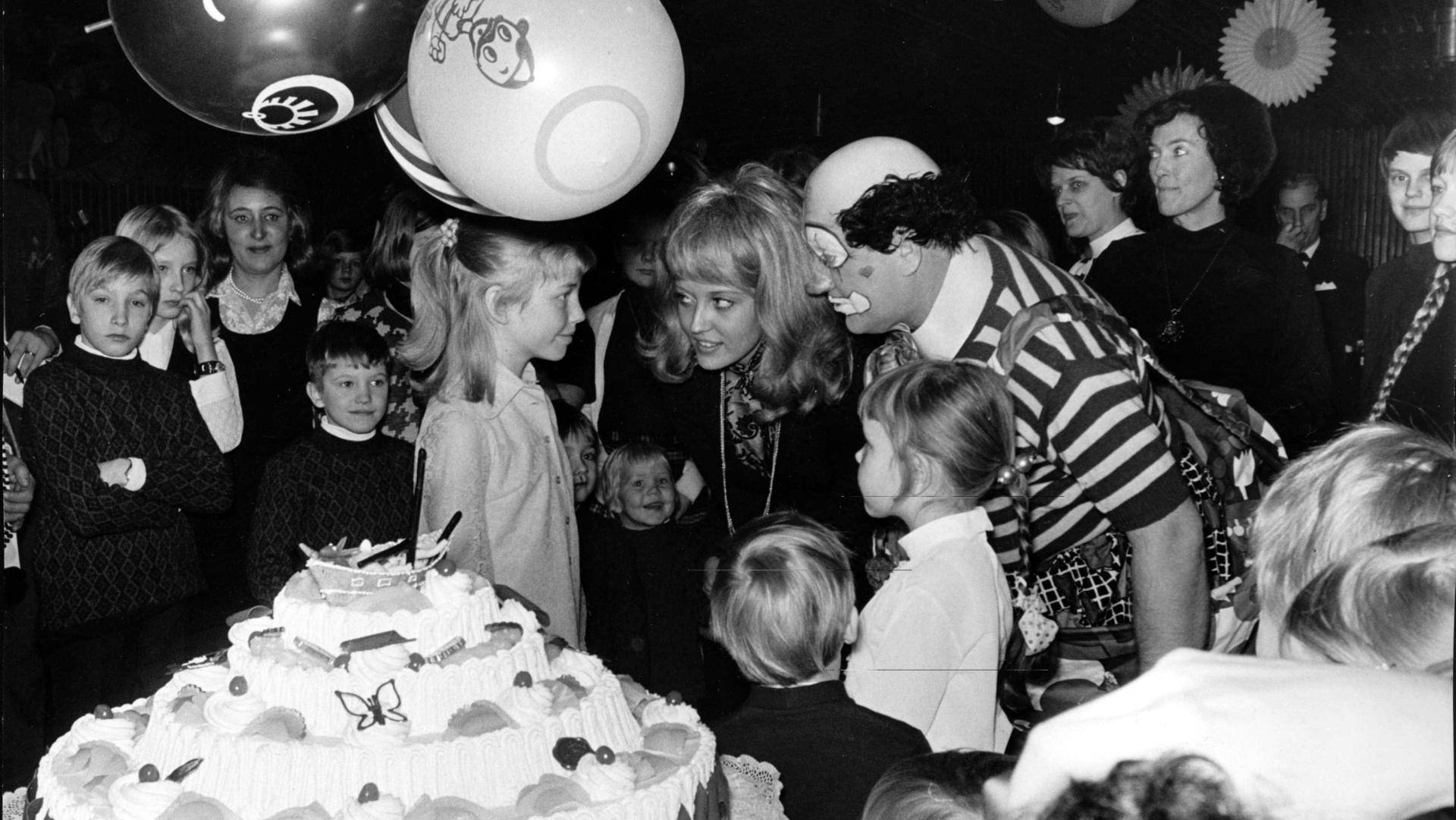
Nilsson with the Finnish clown Onni Gideon in the Helsinki Ice Hall in 1970

Nilsson was eight years old when she was cast as Pippi Longstocking. First, she did a TV series and then four feature films. After Pippi Longstocking, she trained as a medical secretary, but chose to pursue a career as an actress. Nilsson was, among other things, property master at the Östgöta Theatre and acted in several plays.

Since 2007, she has been appearing on the German TV-channel ZDF as the forensic pathologist Ewa in the TV-series Der Kommissar und das Meer (English: The Inspector and the Sea).

In 2009, Nilsson was a celebrity contestant on Kändisdjungeln.

== Awards ==
In 1975, Nilsson received a TP de Oro award in the "Most Popular Personage" category for her role in Pippi Longstocking TV series.

== Filmography ==
- 1969 - Pippi Longstocking
- 1969 - Pippi Goes on Board
- 1970 - Pippi in the South Seas
- 1970 - Pippi on the Run
- 1989 - Brenda Brave
- 2000 - Gripsholm
- 2015 - The Here After
- 2021 – The Hunters

== Discography ==
=== Albums ===
Title	Album details	Peak chart positions		
Title	Album details	SWE	DEN	NOR
Här Kommer Pippi Långstrump	Released: April 1969; Label: Philips	3	10	5
Pippi Långstrump på de sju haven	Released: January 1970; Label: Decca; Formats: LP, MC, 8-track	—	—	—
På rymmen med Pippi Långstrump	Released: November 1970; Label: Philips	5	—	—
"—" denotes releases that did not chart or were not released in that territory.

=== Singles ===
Title	Year	Peak chart positions	
Title	Year	DEN	FIN
"Här kommer Pippi Långstrump"	1969	1	—
"Peppi Pitkätossu" (Finnish-language version)	1970	—	2
"Sjörövar-Fabbe" (Norway-only A-side)	1970	—	—
"Kalle Teodor" (Denmark-only A-side)	1970	5	—
"Keep On Dancing"	1977	—	—
"—" denotes releases that did not chart or were not released in that territory.
