= Fredrik Ohlsson =

Swedish actor (1931–2023)

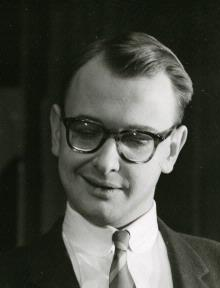
- Ohlsson in 1959
- Born: Carl Fredrik Walter Ola Ohlsson; 12 June 1931; Ulricehamn, Sweden
- Died: 18 November 2023 (aged 92); Stockholm, Sweden
- Education: Royal Academy of Dramatic Art
- Occupation: Actor
- Years active: 1957–2023
- Spouse: Anita Ohlsson (m. 1964; div. 1972)
- Partner: Siw Malmkvist (1971-2023)
- Children: 2

Carl Fredrik Walter Ola Ohlsson (12 June 1931 – 18 November 2023) was a Swedish actor.

In 1956, Ohlsson won a scholarship to Royal Academy of Dramatic Art, where he made his stage debut as Tesman with Siân Phillips as the title character in Hedda Gabler in 1957, opening at The Duke of York's Theatre in London 3 December 1957, later at Det Nye Teatret in Oslo and at The Vanbrugh, RADA. He had a long career in Swedish Television, Film and Theatre. For several years he was a member or of the ensemble at The Royal Dramatic Theatre in Stockholm, Sweden.

Ohlsson died on 18 November 2023, at the age of 92.

He was in a relationship with singer Siw Malmkvist from 1971 until his death.
