= Olle Hellbom =

Swedish regisseur and director

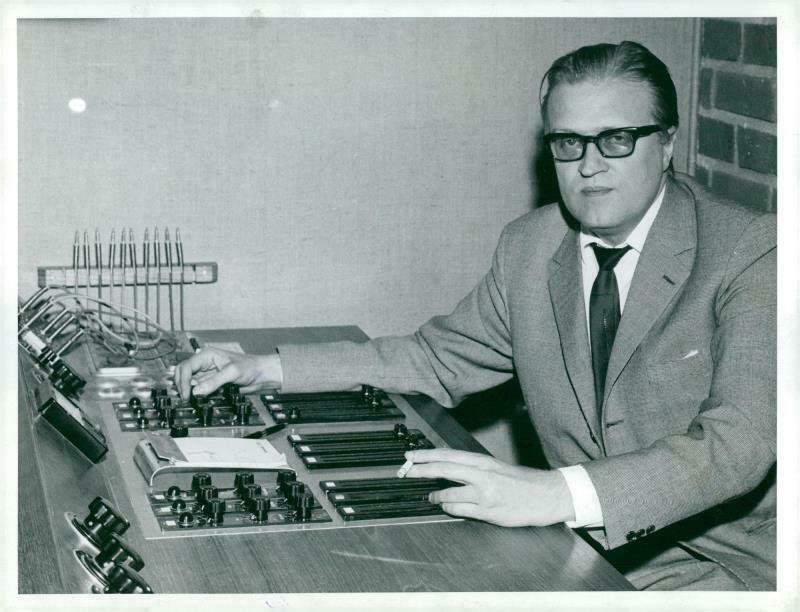
- Born: Nils Olof Hellbom; 8 October 1925; Mörkö, Sweden
- Died: 5 June 1982 (aged 56); Stockholm, Sweden
- Occupations: Director, film producer, screenwriter
- Spouse: Birgit Hellbom (m. 1956–1973)
- Children: Jan, Tove

Nils Olof "Olle" Hellbom (8 October 1925 – 5 June 1982) was a Swedish film director, producer, and screenwriter. He is most famous for directing films based on novels by Astrid Lindgren. His 1960 film Alla vi barn i Bullerbyn was entered into the 2nd Moscow International Film Festival. In 1978 at the 14th Guldbagge Awards he won the award for Best Director for his film The Brothers Lionheart.

He died of stomach cancer.

== Filmography ==
=== Director ===
- 1957 - Mästerdetektiven Blomkvist lever farligt
- 1959 - Raggare!
- 1960 - Alla vi barn i Bullerbyn (TV movie)
- 1964 - Vi på Saltkråkan (TV series)
- 1964 - Tjorven, Båtsman och Moses
- 1965 - Tjorven och Skrållan
- 1966 - Tjorven och Mysak
- 1967 - Skrållan, Ruskprick och Knorrhane
- 1969 - Pippi Longstocking (1969 TV series) (TV series)
- 1970 - Pippi Långstrump på de sju haven
- 1970 - På rymmen med Pippi Långstrump
- 1971 - Emil i Lönneberga
- 1972 - Nya hyss av Emil i Lönneberga
- 1973 - Emil och griseknoen
- 1974 - Världens bästa Karlsson
- 1977 - Bröderna Lejonhjärta
- 1981 - Rasmus på luffen

=== Writer ===
- 1951 - Kvinnan bakom allt
- 1951 - Hon dansade en sommar
- 1955 - Voyage in the Night
- 1980 - To Be a Millionaire
- 1981 - Tuppen

=== Producer ===
- 1981 - Tuppen
- 1976 - Mina drömmars stad
- 1975 - En kille och en tjej
- 1972 - Mannen som slutade röka
