= List of Let the Right One In characters =

Left – Oskar (Kåre Hedebrant) and Eli (Lina Leandersson) in Let the Right One In (2008) Right – Owen (Kodi Smit–McPhee) and Abby (Chloë Grace Moretz) in Let Me In (2010)

The following is a list of characters in the 2004 Swedish vampire fiction novel, Let the Right One In by John Ajvide Lindqvist, as well as its two film adaptations Let the Right One In (Swedish, 2008) and Let Me In (English, 2010). Some individual characters appear in all three works, while others appear in only one or two of the works. The given names of the novel's main characters remain the same for the 2008 film, but are anglicized for the 2010 film. Most of the characters were created by Lindqvist.

== Main characters ==
=== Oskar Eriksson / Owen ===
Oskar or Owen
- Created by: John Ajvide Lindqvist
- Portrayed by: Kåre Hedebrant (2008) as Oskar; Kodi Smit–McPhee (2010) as Owen

In-universe information
- Species: Human (formerly) Vampire (currently)
- Gender: Male
- Nationality: Swedish (Oskar); American (Owen)

Oskar Eriksson is the name of the main protagonist in both the novel and the 2008 Swedish-language film Let the Right One In, while Owen is the name given to this character in the 2010 English-language film Let Me In. In all three works, the character is a 12-year-old boy living with his single mother in a dreary housing estate during the early 1980s. He resides in Blackeberg, Stockholm, Sweden in both the novel and original film, and in Los Alamos, New Mexico, United States in the 2010 film.

Initially, Oskar/Owen is a loner. One of the few friends he has is Tommy, who is a major character in the book, but is omitted from both films save one fleeting mention by Owen in Let Me In. Oskar/Owen is constantly harassed in school by a group of bullies that enjoy torturing and humiliating him, and he fantasizes of one day standing up for himself and injuring or disposing of them. As a result of these experiences, he is initially defensive when he first meets Eli/Abby. The two eventually form a close bond when she notices he is playing with a Rubik's cube, and, because of her fondness for puzzles, Eli's/Abby's interest is piqued. After a particularly bad experience with the bullies, Eli/Abby advises Oskar/Owen that he needs to stand up for himself, and offers him words of encouragement, as well as support if he needs it. In the end, Oskar joins Eli in her nomadic existence, and eventually, in the sequel short story "Let the Old Dreams Die", he allows himself to be infected with vampirism, thus joining Eli as a hunter of the night.

Oskar has a closer relationship with his mother in the novel and 2008 film than Owen does in Let Me In. In the novel and original film, Oskar's mother is caring, loving and spends time with him. In the 2010 film, Owen's mother is a neglectful Christian alcoholic and her face is never shown, which might explain why he is drawn to Abby. This is comparable to Oskar's father in the novel and original film, who is also an alcoholic and neglectful of Oskar when he visits on weekends. Owen's father is never seen in Let Me In, his voice is heard once during a conversation with Owen on the telephone, where he seems very caring and concerned about Owen living with his mother.

=== Eli / Abby ===
Eli or Abby
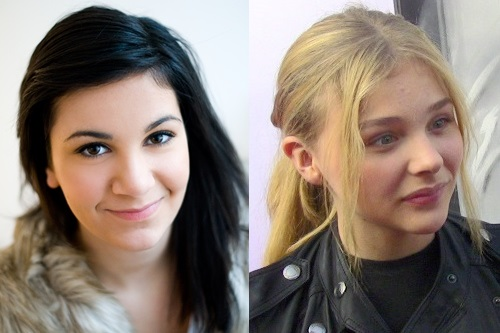
- Lina Leandersson and Chloë Grace Moretz
- Created by: John Ajvide Lindqvist
- Portrayed by: Lina Leandersson (2008) as Eli; Susanne Ruben (2008) as Aged Eli; Chloë Grace Moretz (2010) as Abby
- Voiced by: Elif Ceylan (2008) as Eli

In-universe information
- Species: Vampire
- Gender: Male (novel); Female (Let The Right One In); Female (Let Me In)

Eli, originally known as Elias (male) in the book, is the name of the centuries-old child vampire in both the novel and original film Let the Right One In, renamed Abby for the 2010 film Let Me In. When Eli/Abby moves into the apartment nextdoor to Oskar/Owen, the two characters become very close friends. Eli/Abby requires the consumption of human blood to live, and cannot eat or drink anything else without vomiting it out. Her hunger is shown to take a severe physical toll on her. As Eli/Abby is immune to the cold and the snow, she is sometimes barefoot when she goes out which makes climbing things like walls and trees easy for her. The character also cannot be exposed to the Sun without being burned up to the eventual point of bursting into flames and cannot enter the home or room of an individual unless there is verbal permission given by that individual to do so (for example, "you can come in") or the character will bleed profusely (to death if not invited in). This, along with a metaphorical allusion to "letting someone into" one's life, is the basis for the titles Let the Right One In and Let Me In.

In the original film, the child Eli was portrayed by one actress while another actress provided the character's voice. The elderly Eli was played by a third actress.

=== Håkan / Thomas ===
Håkan or "The Father"
- Created by: John Ajvide Lindqvist
- Portrayed by: Per Ragnar (2008) as Håkan; Richard Jenkins (2010) as "The Father"

In-universe information
- Species: Human (films); Vampire (novel)
- Gender: Male
- Nationality: Swedish (Håkan); American ("The Father")

Håkan is a middle-aged male that lives and travels with Eli in the novel and 2008 film Let the Right One In. His counterpart's name in Let Me In is not revealed, and he is credited as simply "The Father", although a later comic series based on the 2010 film names him Thomas. Håkan is a pedophile in the book, with pertaining activities detailed explicitly. He first met Eli when he was already an adult. While the character of the same name in the 2008 film is assumed to have similar characteristics, any details surrounding his potential pedophilia or history with Eli are not revealed, only hinted upon in their dialogue and a few scenes. The comparable character in Let Me In is heavily implied to not be a pedophile, and having instead met and possibly been with Abby since he was a young child, and it is implied that he acts more as a protective "father" figure to Abby in his old age, rather than as a lover. Within the film plots, Håkan is used as a foreshadowing of what Oskar / Owen will eventually become, while the sequel short story "Let the Old Dreams Die" features a different outcome.

== Secondary characters ==
=== Lacke ===
Lacke
- Created by: John Ajvide Lindqvist
- Portrayed by: Peter Carlberg (2008)
- Present in: Let the Right One In (novel); Let the Right One In (2008 film)

In-universe information
- Species: Human
- Gender: Male
- Nationality: Swedish

Lacke is a local middle-aged male resident of Blackeberg whose story and group of friends play a major role in both the novel and the 2008 film Let the Right One In, where he eventually becomes an antagonist to the main characters. Lacke is completely omitted from the 2010 film Let Me In, and is replaced by an unnamed authority figure credited as "The Policeman". Lacke is an alcoholic who has a strained relationship with his girlfriend Virginia. He spends a lot of time with his friends Morgan, Jocke and Larry at a local bar, which is where he first meets Håkan.

Lacke first becomes involved in the main storyline when his friend Jocke disappears after Eli attacks him for blood, an event that is witnessed by Gösta, one of the townspeople. When Jocke's dead body is found and it is revealed that Eli must have killed him, Lacke is determined to investigate the situation.

=== Virginia ===
Virginia
- Created by: John Ajvide Lindqvist
- Portrayed by: Ika Nord (2008); Sasha Barrese (2010)
- Present in: Let the Right One In (novel); Let the Right One In (2008 film); Let Me In (2010 film)

In-universe information
- Species: Human; Vampire
- Gender: Female

Virginia in the novel and original Swedish film is a middle-aged woman who is the on-again/off-again girlfriend of major secondary character Lacke. A much more youthful and physically attractive character of the same name appears in Let Me In (2010), and she and her boyfriend (named "Larry" after a different character in the original) play a much smaller role in the story. She is the only character besides Jimmy whose name is the same in all versions.

In the novel and original film, Virginia is very weary of Lacke's alcoholism, and is on the verge of breaking it off with him permanently because of it.

=== Tommy ===
- Created by: John Ajvide Lindqvist

Tommy is a young rebellious boy who is described as Oskar/Owen's only friend other than Eli/Abby. His story is a significant part of the novel's narrative, but he is completely absent from the 2008 film, and is only mentioned by Owen once in the 2010 film, where he is not seen. Tommy lives with his mother Yvonne and her policeman boyfriend Staffan (not to be confused with "The Policeman" from Let Me In), with whom he has a very strained relationship. He also has an older brother that is seldom around anymore.

=== "The Policeman" ===
- Created by: Matt Reeves
- Portrayed by: Elias Koteas (2010)

"The Policeman" is the credited namesake of a middle-aged, balding authority figure (possibly a detective) in the 2010 film Let Me In who effectively replaces the character of Lacke and other townspeople from the novel and original film. Unlike Lacke, "The Policeman" has no personal interest in bringing justice to those responsible for attacking the townspeople; he is merely responsible for doing so. He is the first major character that is seen on-screen in Let Me In, and serves alongside Owen's bullies as the main antagonist of the film.

=== Jonny/Conny/Kenny ===
- Portrayed by: Patrik Rydmark (2008 film), Dylan Minnette (2010 film)

Owen/Oskar's bully and antagonist in all versions of the story. He sadistically attacks Owen/Oskar every chance he gets. He never relents until Owen/Oskar stands up for himself. He is the leader of a posse of bullies, who is seen doing acts such as beating Owen/Oskar with an antenna rod (a light tree branch in the novel), in the 2010 film, he is seen trying to pull off a girl's bathing suit in a public swimming pool, and even willing to kill Owen/Oskar. In the film version, when Owen/Oskar stands up for himself, he splits Jonny/Kenny/Conny's ear open with a metal pole when he was threatened to be thrown into the icy pond, but in the original novel, Oskar placed his mitten on Jonny's ear. The bullies take actions further by attacking Oskar at the train station and threaten to throw him into an oncoming train causing Oskar to set fire to a photo of Jonny's father and accidentally setting fire to the rest of the students' desks. In spite of this, Jonny/Conny/Kenny later decides to retaliate with his brother Jimmy. They set fire outside of the community pool to lure out the gym teacher (in the novel, Jimmy's friends knock the teacher unconscious with blunt force) and scare everybody else out. They threaten to drown Owen/Oskar, but in the midst of this, they are attacked by Eli/Abby, who kills all the bullies in the American film, all except for Andreas in the Swedish film, and only Jonny and Jimmy in the novel.

=== Jimmy ===
- Portrayed by: Ramus Luthander (2008 film), Brett DelBuono (2010 film)

The older brother of Jonny/Conny/Kenny and antagonist in all versions. He is shown to be more sadistic than his younger brother and just as much a bully. He shows up in the story after Oskar/Owen stands up to him. He openly treats his brother poorly but he decides to help him and his friends retaliate against Oskar/Owen. His role becomes important at the climax of the story; he sets a fire outside of the community pool and scares the students out.

In the 2010 film, he steals a knife that Owen threatened him with when he made a run for it, but in the novel and 2008 film he had a knife of his own. Jimmy tells Oskar/Owen that if he can hold his breath for three minutes, he'll give him a little cut, and if not, then he will carve out his eye. As he begins to drown Oskar/Owen, Eli/Abby arrives and slaughters the bullies, Jimmy was the first to die in the American film as his head was ripped off and thrown in the water. He is the only character besides Virginia to keep their name in all versions. Jimmy is well known to often have hiccups in the novel; however, this is not shown in the film.

== Other characters ==
=== Novel only ===
- Yvonne – Tommy's mother in the novel. She is widowed and dating Staffan, a police officer. For unknown reasons, Oskar's mother is given the name "Yvonne" in the 2008 film.
- Staffan – Tommy's mother's new boyfriend in the novel. He is a police officer who is personally involved with investigating Eli and Håkan's string of murders, and he has a strained relationship with Tommy.
- Johan - A boy who Oskar knows from school, who was throughout most of the novel on good terms with Oskar and occasionally hung out with him. However, he was not a truly close friend of Oskar's, as he only hung out with Oskar when he had nothing else to do, and in the end even helps lure Oskar into Jonny and Jimmy's trap, unaware of what they were actually planning to do to Oskar.
- Prebbe and Roger - Friends of Jimmy's, only seen in the end, who assist Jonny and Jimmy in their plot to attack Oskar.
- Karlsson – The former owner of a toy shop who sometimes hangs out with Lacke and his friends. He and Morgan often argue.
- The Man in the Wig - An 18th-century vampire nobleman who castrates Eli and infects her with his condition. In the 2010 film, his character was Abby's uncle who infected her with his condition.
- Stefan and Karin Larsson - Stefan (not to be confused with Staffan, above) is the train conductor who asks to see Oskar's ticket in the end, and is seen doing so in the 2010 American film. Karin is a police officer from Blackeberg (the setting of the novel) who investigated Eli's massacre on Oskar's tormentors; the two met and fell in love in the course of said investigation. Initially they continue to search for Oskar and Eli in order to resolve the murder case, but decades later, as old age and sickness take their toll, they decide to track them down in order to ask them to turn them into vampires too, and thus preserve their relationship.
- The Ticket Collector - A retired public servant and the narrator of the short story Let the Old Dreams Die, who becomes a close friend of the Larssons when they move into his neighborhood.

=== Novel and 2008 film ===
- Erik (Henrik Dahl) – Oskar's father. He is an alcoholic and lives in the countryside. Oskar visits him on the weekends, but his drinking habits cause him to become neglectful of his son.
- Jocke (Mikael Rahm) – One of Lacke's friends who is murdered by Håkan and Eli.
- Gösta (Karl Robert Lindgren) – A loner friend of Lacke's who lives with his numerous cats and who witnesses the murder of Jocke.
- Mr. Ávila (Cayetano Ruiz) – Oskar's gym teacher who assists him with getting into shape.
- Morgan (Anders T. Peedu) – Another of Lacke's friends. He is slightly unpleasant but a good mate.
- Larry (Pale Olofsson) – Another of Lacke's friends. He is frail and have been on early retirement. He is very friendly and a good mate.
- Andreas/Micke – One of the bullies, and the most reluctant. He is the only one who survived Eli's attack in the Swedish film.

=== 2010 film ===
- Mr. Zoric (Ritchie Coster) – Owen's gym teacher who assists him with getting into shape, corresponding to Mr. Ávila in the novel and original film.
- Owen's Mother (Cara Buono) – Owen's unnamed mother, who is a neglectful religious alcoholic unlike her counterpart in the novel and original film.
- Owen's Father (voiced by Elias Koteas) – Owen's unnamed father, who only talks to him once over the phone, questioning his wife's fervent religiosity and blaming her for their son's current problem. Elias Koteas also plays "The Policeman" in the film.

== See also ==
- John Ajvide Lindqvist
- Vampire fiction
