= Thea Hvistendahl =

Norwegian filmmaker (born 1989)

- Born: 1989 (age 35–36)
- Occupation(s): Film director, screenwriter

Thea Hvistendahl (born 1989) is a Norwegian filmmaker best known for the 2024 horror film Handling the Undead.

== Education ==
Hvistendahl studied filmmaking at Westerdals School of Communication in Oslo.

== Career ==
Hvistendahl began directing short films and commercials in the early 2010s. In 2017, she participated in the Berlinale Talents Short Form Station program to develop her short film Children of Satan, which was released in 2019.

Hvistendahl's 2024 feature film, an adaptation of the John Ajvide Lindqvist novel Handling the Undead, premiered in the World Cinematic Dramatic Competition at the 2024 Sundance Film Festival.

== Filmography ==
=== Film ===
Year	Title	Notes	Ref.
2013	you and me, mommy	Short film	
2016	Intruders	Short film	
2017	The Monkey and The Mouth	—	
2018	Virgins4Lyfe	Short film	
2019	Children of Satan	Short film	
2020	Cramps	Short film	
2024	Handling the Undead	—	

=== Commercials ===
Year	Company	Title	Ref.
2016	DNB Eindom	"Baby"	
2016	DNB Eindom	"Husdyr"	

=== Music videos ===
Year	Artist	Title	Ref.
2015	Kaja Gunnufsen	"Faen Ta"	
2016	Karpe Diem	"Den islamske elefanten"	
2021	Girl in Red	"Body and Mind"	
