= Let the Wrong One In =

2021 Irish horror comedy movie

- Theatrical release poster
- Directed by: Conor McMahon
- Written by: Conor McMahon
- Based on: Let the Right One In by John Ajvide Lindqvist
- Produced by: Trisha Flood; Julianne Forde; Michael Lavelle; Ruth Treacy
- Starring: Karl Rice; Eoin Duffy; Hilda Fay; Lisa Haskins; Anthony Head
- Cinematography: Michael Lavelle
- Edited by: Brian Philip Davis
- Music by: Liam Bates
- Production company: Workshed Films
- Distributed by: Wildcard Distribution
- Release dates: September 24, 2021 (Fantastic Fest); January 20, 2023 (Ireland)
- Running time: 101 minutes
- Country: Ireland
- Language: English

Let the Wrong One In is a 2021 Irish horror comedy film written and directed by Conor McMahon. The film stars Karl Rice, Eoin Duffy, Hilda Fay, Lisa Haskins and Anthony Head. Let the Wrong One In was shown at festivals in 2021 but did not go on general release in Ireland until 2023. It received positive critical response.

== Plot ==
Dublin supermarket worker Matt is too nice for his own good. When his older, estranged brother Deco is turned into a vampire, he’s faced with a dilemma.

== Cast ==
- Karl Rice - Matt
- Eoin Duffy - Deco
- Anthony Head - Henry the taxi driver
- Hilda Fay - Matt & Deco's mother
- Mary Murray - Sheila (Henry's fiance)
- David Pearse
- Lisa Haskins
- Laura Murray
- Denise McCormack
- Bríd Ní Chomain
- Amy Coleman
- Aisling McArdle

== Production ==
The film is loosely based on the 2004 novel Let the Right One In by John Ajvide Lindqvist and the 2008 Swedish-language film also named the same, which too is based on the 2004 novel. It was shot on location in various sites around Dublin, including the tourist attraction Bram Stoker's Castle Dracula (now closed).

== Release and reception ==
The film premiered at Fantastic Fest in Austin, Texas on 24 September 2021.

On Rotten Tomatoes, the film has an approval rating of 88% based on 16 reviews.

Let the Wrong One In won Best Visual Effects at the 2021 Screamfest Horror Film Festival. It was nominated for the Discovery Award at the 2022 Dublin International Film Festival. Conor McMahon was nominated for Best Director and Best Script at the 19th Irish Film & Television Awards.
