= Handling the Undead (film) =

2024 horror film by Thea Hvistendahl

- International release poster
- Norwegian: Håndtering av udøde
- Directed by: Thea Hvistendahl
- Screenplay by: Thea Hvistendahl; John Ajvide Lindqvist
- Based on: Handling the Undead by John Ajvide Lindqvist
- Produced by: Kristin Emblem; Guri Neby
- Starring: Renate Reinsve; Bjørn Sundquist; Bente Børsum; Anders Danielsen Lie; Bahar Pars; Inesa Dauksta
- Cinematography: Pål Ulvik Rokseth
- Edited by: Thomas Grotmol; Trude Lirhus
- Music by: Peter Raeburn
- Production companies: Einar Film; Zentropa; Norwegian Film Institute; Swedish Film Institute; Film i Väst; Nordisk Film & TV Fond
- Distributed by: Nordisk Film
- Release dates: 20 January 2024 (Sundance); 9 February 2024
- Running time: 99 minutes
- Country: Norway
- Language: Norwegian
- Box office: $232,281

Handling the Undead is a 2024 Norwegian horror mystery film, directed by Thea Hvistendahl from a screenplay by Hvistendahl and John Ajvide Lindqvist, based upon the novel of the same name by Lindqvist. It stars Renate Reinsve, Bjørn Sundquist, Bente Børsum, Anders Danielsen Lie, Bahar Pars and Inesa Dauksta.

It had its world premiere at the 2024 Sundance Film Festival on 20 January 2024, and was released in Norway on 9 February 2024, by Nordisk Film. It won the 2024 Méliès d'Or.

== Plot ==
After an inexplicable event causes the dead to return, three grieving families are confronted with the resurrection of their loved ones: Mahler, who lost his young grandson Elias, the son of his daughter Anna; David, who mourns his wife Eva; and Tora, who is devastated by the death of her partner Elisabet.

Mahler is visiting Elias’s grave when the event occurs. He collapses, only to awaken lying across the grave. Digging up the coffin, he finds Elias alive but in an advanced state of decay. He brings the child home, and when Anna returns from her night shift, she finds Elias in bed. Confused and overwhelmed, she spirals into despair, attempting to end her life. Mahler intervenes, saving her.

Meanwhile, David, at work when the event strikes, receives a call about Eva’s accident. He rushes to the hospital, but she dies before he arrives. While sitting by her body, she unexpectedly starts breathing again, leaving the hospital staff baffled.

Oslo becomes a city where the dead walk among the living, lost in a trance, unable to communicate. Residents wake to find the streets filled with the newly resurrected, many desperately trying to escape their graves.

Tora, unable to accept Elisabet’s death, bathes and dresses her in an attempt to restore some sense of normalcy. Tora attempts to feed her some toast, but Elisabet attempts to bite Tora's hand. Tora shares one last dance with Elisabet, then overdoses to join her in death.

Mahler and Anna retreat to a remote cottage with Elias, hoping to find peace, but Elias’s strange behavior and the smell of decay intensify Anna’s growing dread. As tensions mount, Anna finds herself alone at the cottage with Elias. She takes a swim, but upon returning, she encounters a decomposing man near the cottage. Mahler arrives just in time to fight the man off, but he is killed when the man bites his throat. Anna flees the cottage with Elias in a rowboat.

David, seeking answers, contacts the hospital, only to be told there are no updates on Eva. He tries to continue life with his children Flora and Kian, including celebrating Kian’s birthday. When they visit Eva at the hospital, she holds Kian’s pet bunny but crushes it in a trance. Flora quietly declares, “Mom is dead,” and David is forced to face the truth.

Kian, overwhelmed by the loss of his mother, buries his bunny in a private ceremony in the woods. The story concludes with Anna and Elias on the rowboat. She tells him she loves him and gently places him in the water, watching him sink.

== Cast ==
- Renate Reinsve as Anna
- Bjørn Sundquist as Mahler
- Bente Børsum as Tora
- Anders Danielsen Lie as David
- Bahar Pars as Eva
- Inesa Dauksta as Flora
- Kian Hansen as Kian
- Olga Damani as Elisabet

== Production ==
In August 2022, it was announced Renate Reinsve, Bjørn Sundquist, Bente Børsum, Anders Danielsen Lie, Bahar Pars and Inesa Dauksta had joined the cast of the film, with Thea Hvistendahl directing from a screenplay she wrote alongside John Ajvide Lindqvist, based upon the novel of the same name, with Nordisk Film set to distribute in Norway.

== Release ==
It had its world premiere at the 2024 Sundance Film Festival on 20 January 2024. Prior to, Neon acquired North American and UK distribution rights to the film. It also screened at the Gothenburg Film Festival on 26 January 2024. It was released in Norway on 9 February 2024.

== Reception ==
On the review aggregator website Rotten Tomatoes, 75% of 68 critics' reviews are positive, with an average rating of 6.3/10. The website's consensus reads: "A grounded zombie picture with emotional bite, Handling the Undead shuffles along at a patient pace but succeeds as a poignant and thoughtful addition to the genre." Metacritic, which uses a weighted average, assigned the film a score of 70 out of 100, based on 17 critics, indicating "generally favorable" reviews.
