= Summer of 1985 =

2026 Swedish television series

- Genre: Coming-of-age; Mystery
- Created by: Amy Deasismont; Melina Maraki
- Based on: Summer of 1985 by John Ajvide Lindqvist
- Directed by: Björn Stein; Amy Deasismont
- Starring: Linus Rogsgård; Stina Kristiansen; Josefin Neldén; Sanna Sundqvist; Rolf Lassgård
- Composer: Jonas Wikstrand
- Country of origin: Sweden
- Original language: Swedish
- No. of episodes: 6

Production
- Production companies: Media Res Studio; Sveriges Television; Film Stockholm

Original release
- Network: SVT
- Release: 24 July 2026

Summer of 1985 (Swedish: Svärtan) is a Swedish television series created by Amy Deasismont and Melina Maraki, based on a novel by John Ajvide Lindqvist. The six-part series premiered at Canneseries in April 2026 and was broadcast by SVT from 24 July 2026.

== Premise ==
In the summer of 1985, a teenage boy is found drowned near the island of Svärtan in the Stockholm archipelago. Fourteen-year-old Johannes and his friends discover an injured and unexplained creature on the island, and the investigation into the death, together with jealousy, grief and suspicion, breaks the group apart.

== Cast ==
- Linus Rogsgård as Johannes
- Ture Nerman as Mattias
- Nelly Anderbro
- Stina Kristiansen as Felicia
- Josefin Neldén
- Sanna Sundqvist
- Rolf Lassgård as the Gunpowder Man

== Production ==
The series adapts a novel by John Ajvide Lindqvist, the author of Let the Right One In. Deasismont and Maraki wrote the series; Björn Stein acted as conceptual director and directed half of the six episodes, with Deasismont directing the remainder.

It was produced by Media Res Studio with SVT and Film Stockholm, with international sales handled by Fifth Season, and is set in the Stockholm archipelago.

== Release and awards ==
Summer of 1985 had its world premiere in competition at Canneseries, held from 23 to 28 April 2026, where the composer Jonas Wikstrand won the award for best music. Albin Lewi, the festival's artistic director, described the series as "a bit like Stand by Me with a touch of Guillermo del Toro".

It was broadcast on SVT from July 2026.
