= Matt Reeves =

American filmmaker (born 1966)

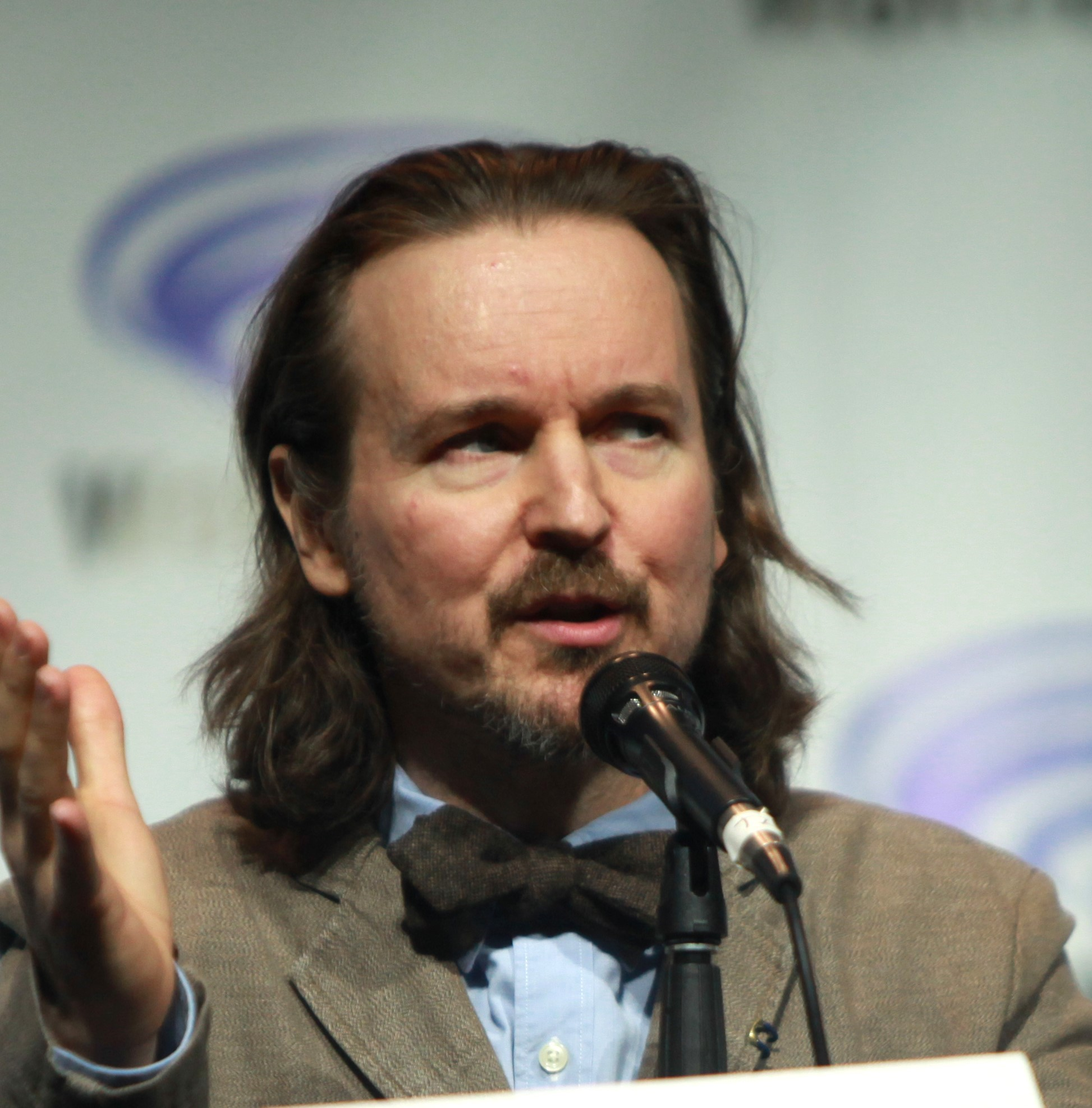
- Reeves in 2014
- Born: April 27, 1966 (age 60); Rockville Centre, New York, U.S.
- Education: University of Southern California
- Occupations: Director; producer; screenwriter
- Years active: 1990s–present
- Spouse: Melinda Wang (m. 1999)
- Children: 1

Matt Reeves (born April 27, 1966) is an American filmmaker. He first gained recognition for the WB drama series Felicity (1998–2002), which he co-created with J. J. Abrams. Reeves came to widespread attention for directing the hit monster-film Cloverfield (2008). He also directed the vampire drama Let Me In (2010), and the critically acclaimed science-fiction sequels Dawn of the Planet of the Apes (2014) and War for the Planet of the Apes (2017). He directed the superhero film The Batman (2022), which stars Robert Pattinson as the titular character; its sequel, The Batman: Part II, is scheduled for release in 2028.

== Early life and education ==
Reeves was born on April 27, 1966, in Rockville Centre, New York, on Long Island. He is the son of George C. Reeves Jr., a lawyer, Hollywood business executive, writer, and producer. He moved with his family to Los Angeles when he was five. He made his first film at the age of eight, directing friends and using a wind-up camera. Reeves met and befriended J. J. Abrams, who also became a filmmaker, when both were 13 years old. A Los Angeles public-access television cable channel, Z Channel, was airing their short films. When they were 15 or 16 years old, Steven Spielberg hired them to transfer some of his own Super 8 films to videotape.

Reeves attended the University of Southern California, where he was a screenwriting student for writer Jeph Loeb. Between 1991 and 1992, he produced a student film, Mr. Petrified Forest, which won an award and helped him acquire an agent. He also co-wrote a script that eventually was developed as Under Siege 2: Dark Territory.

== Career ==
=== Early career and 2000s ===
Mr. Petrified Forrest made its debut in the horror anthology film "Future Shock" (1994). Reeves made his directorial debut with the romantic comedy film The Pallbearer (1996), which co-starred Gwyneth Paltrow and David Schwimmer. The film was screened in Un Certain Regard section at the 1996 Cannes Film Festival.

Reeves was recognized for co-creating and showrunning the WB drama series Felicity, alongside J. J. Abrams. The series ran for 84 episodes, from 1998 to 2002. Reeves directed several episodes of the series, including the pilot. He also directed episodes of various other television series, including Relativity, Homicide: Life on the Street, and Gideon's Crossing, among others.

Reeves gained further success and international recognition for his direction of the science fiction monster film Cloverfield (2008), which Abrams produced. Reeves later served as an executive producer on 10 Cloverfield Lane (2016) and The Cloverfield Paradox (2018).

In September 2008, Reeves was hired to write and direct the vampire film Let Me In, an English-language adaptation of the 2004 novel Let the Right One In by John Ajvide Lindqvist and a remake of the 2008 Swedish film of the same name. The film, a co-production with Hammer Films, was released in the United States on October 1, 2010, by Overture Films.

=== 2010s ===
Reeves was brought on by 20th Century Fox to direct the science-fiction film Dawn of the Planet of the Apes (2014), the sequel to Rise of the Planet of the Apes. The film became a commercial and critical success and resulted in Reeves signing a three-year production deal with 20th Century Fox. He then returned to write and direct the third film in the series, War for the Planet of the Apes, which was released on July 14, 2017.

In January 2018, Reeves moved his production deal to Netflix, signing an exclusive first-look film deal with the company under his 6th & Idaho production banner.

Reeves served as executive producer on the Amazon Prime Video science fiction drama series Tales from the Loop. The series, based on artwork by Simon Stålenhag, premiered to positive reviews in April 2020.

=== 2020s ===
In July 2020, Reeves signed an exclusive, multi-year overall deal with Warner Bros. Television to develop new television programming for all of the company's platforms under his production company, 6th & Idaho. Reeves served as executive producer on the Netflix science-fiction drama series Away (2020), starring Hilary Swank. In August 2022, Reeves signed a multi-year first-look film and television deal with Warner Bros. Pictures.

In February 2017, Reeves was hired to direct and produce a Batman film, titled The Batman, which would serve as part of the DC Extended Universe (DCEU). He took over the position from Ben Affleck, who initially planned to stay involved as producer and star before dropping out completely, with Reeves opting to retool the film to separate it completely from the DCEU and focus on a younger incarnation of the character, allowing him the opportunity to create a more personal story in line with his own vision and understanding of the character. Reeves co-wrote the screenplay with Peter Craig, and principal photography commenced in January 2020. Premiering in London on February 23, 2022, The Batman was released theatrically on March 4, starring Robert Pattinson as Bruce Wayne / Batman. The film is expected to serve as the first installment of a new Batman film trilogy, as well as establish a new shared universe centred on Batman; the first sequel, The Batman: Part II, was announced in April 2022 with Reeves returning to write and direct, and will be released in theatres in February 2028.

=== Unrealized projects ===
On October 6, 2000, it was announced that Reeves was working with ABC and Touchstone Television to develop an hourlong coming-of-age drama set in the 1970s about a family turmoil, told from the perspective of an 11 year old boy. In addition to writing, Reeves was to have also directed if picked up as a pilot by ABC. He later retooled the project as a feature film titled The Invisible Woman, which he was set to direct for GreeneStreet Films in 2008. At that time, the project was described in Variety as a "Hitchcock-style thriller that probes the mind of a former beauty queen who turns to a life of crime to protect her family." Naomi Watts was cast to star, but the production fell apart before shooting could begin. Reeves then pitched The Invisible Woman to Overture Films following the release of Cloverfield, and made further attempts to make it after the releases of Let Me In and Dawn of the Planet of the Apes. In March 2022, Reeves indicated he still hoped to direct The Invisible Woman, stating, "I've been wanting to find my way back to that".

On April 11, 2011, it was announced that Reeves would write and direct a science fiction thriller based on the Ray Nelson short story "Eight O'Clock in the Morning" for Universal Pictures, with Strike Entertainment's Eric Newman and Marc Abraham producing. The story had previously been adapted as the John Carpenter film They Live (1988). On June 27, 2011, during an interview with Collider, Reeves stated that the project would not be a remake of They Live. According to Carpenter, the title of Reeves' version was Resistance.

On April 18, 2011, it was announced that Reeves would direct the vampire epic The Passage for Fox 2000 and Scott Free Productions, based on the novel by Justin Cronin and adapted by John Logan. On June 20, it was announced that Jason Keller would write the screenplay for the project. On November 11, 2016, it was announced that the project had been reworked into a potential television series at 20th Century Fox Television, with Fox giving a pilot production commitment and Reeves remaining attached as executive producer and pilot director.

On May 24, 2011, it was announced that Reeves had signed on to direct This Dark Endeavour for Summit Entertainment, a retelling of Frankenstein to be adapted by Jacob Aaron Estes from the novel of the same name by Kenneth Oppel.

On October 15, 2011, it was announced that Reeves would direct a new film based on the classic television series The Twilight Zone for Warner Bros. Pictures, with a screenplay by Jason Rothenberg and Leonardo DiCaprio and Jennifer Davisson producing through Appian Way Productions alongside Michael Ireland. On December 1, it was announced that Anthony Peckham would rewrite the screenplay, with Joby Harold subsequently being hired for rewrites on June 6, 2012. On September 25, 2012, it was announced that Reeves was no longer attached to the project owing to scheduling issues.

On December 2, 2014, it was announced that Reeves would direct an untitled heist thriller film for 20th Century Fox based on a pitch by Matt Charman, with Tobey Maguire and Matthew Plouffe producing the project through Material Pictures alongside Reeves and Adam Kassan, who had brought the project to Reeves' attention.

On November 30, 2015, it was announced that Reeves' company 6th & Idaho would produce Spring Offensive, a female-led political thriller spec script by Matthew McInerny-Lacombe, acquired by 20th Century Fox, with 6th & Idaho developing the project as a directing vehicle for Reeves.

On April 25, 2016, it was announced that Paramount Pictures had acquired an untitled project based on an original pitch by Marlon Smith and Daniel Fajemisin-Duncan, which would be produced by Reeves' 6th & Idaho as a potential directing vehicle for Reeves.

Reeves was set to produce a film adaptation of the comic book series Mouse Guard for 20th Century Fox, with Wes Ball signing on to direct in September 2017. Thomas Brodie-Sangster, Andy Serkis, and Idris Elba were set to star in the film alongside Sonoya Mizuno, Samson Kayo, and Jack Whitehall, but the project was cancelled on April 17, 2019, two weeks before it was set to begin production, due to Disney's acquisition of 20th Century Fox.

On January 19, 2023, it was announced Reeves would direct and executive produce a limited series about Buster Keaton starring Rami Malek, with Ted Cohen writing; the project is expected to be based on the biography Buster Keaton: A Filmmaker's Life by James Curtis.

On April 2, 2026, it was reported that Apple TV was developing an adaptation of Tom Wolfe's 1987 novel The Bonfire of the Vanities with David E. Kelley writing and executive producing alongside Reeves, who would direct, Matthew Tinker of David E. Kelley Productions, and Sarah Geismer of 6th & Idaho. Warner Bros. Television is the studio. On August 5, 2026, Deadline reported that the project was not going forward at Apple TV and that Warner Bros. Television and David E. Kelley Productions were in the process of shopping it to other outlets with reasons cited that both parties not being creatively aligned and Kelley's dissatisfaction on how the project had been handled.

== Personal life ==
Reeves has been married to Melinda Wang, a former animator, since 1999. They have one son together, Michael Wang Reeves.

== Filmography ==
=== Feature film ===
Year	Title	Director	Writer	Producer
1995	Under Siege 2: Dark Territory	No	Yes	No
1996	The Pallbearer	Yes	Yes	No
2000	The Yards	No	Yes	Co-producer
2008	Cloverfield	Yes	No	No
2010	Let Me In	Yes	Yes	No
2014	Dawn of the Planet of the Apes	Yes	No	No
2017	War for the Planet of the Apes	Yes	Yes	No
2022	The Batman	Yes	Yes	Yes
2028	The Batman: Part II †	Yes	Yes	Yes

=== Short film ===
Year	Title	Director	Writer	Notes
1987	Break-In	Yes	Yes	Student film produced at USC
1992	Mr. Petrified Forest	Yes	Yes	USC Master's Thesis; Later released as a segment in the anthology Future Shock (1994)

Producer

- Mother/Android (2021)
- Lift (2024)
- The Wrecking Crew (2026)
- Clayface (2026)

Executive producer

- 10 Cloverfield Lane (2016)
- The Cloverfield Paradox (2018)
- Animal Farm (2025)

=== Television ===
Year	Title	Director	Executive producer	Notes
1997	Relativity	Yes	No	Episode: "Billable Hours"
1997	Homicide: Life on the Street	Yes	No	Episode: "All is Bright"
1998–2002	Felicity	Yes	Yes	Also creator Directed 5 episodes
2000	Gideon's Crossing	Yes	No	Episode: "The Gift"
2003	Miracles	Yes	No	Episode: "The Ferguson Syndrome"
2006	Conviction	Yes	No	Episode: "Pilot"
2019	The Passage	No	Yes	
2019	Surveillance	No	Yes	Unsold TV pilot
2020	Tales from the Loop	No	Yes	
2020	Away	No	Yes	
2021	Ordinary Joe	No	Yes	Also creator Co-writer for episode: "Way Leads on to Way"
2024–present	Batman: Caped Crusader	No	Yes	
2024	The Penguin	No	Yes	

== Reception ==
=== Critical response and box office ===
Title	Rotten Tomatoes	Metacritic	CinemaScore	Budget	Box office
The Pallbearer	48% (21 reviews)	—N/a	—N/a	$8 million	$5 million
Cloverfield	78% (213 reviews)	64 (37 reviews)	C	$25 million	$170.8 million
Let Me In	88% (237 reviews)	79 (35 reviews)	C+	$20 million	$24.1 million
Dawn of the Planet of the Apes	91% (318 reviews)	79 (48 reviews)	A–	$170 million	$710.6 million
War for the Planet of the Apes	94% (365 reviews)	82 (50 reviews)	A–	$150 million	$490.7 million
The Batman	85% (508 reviews)	72 (68 reviews)	A–	$200 million	$770.8 million

=== Awards and nominations ===
Year	Association	Work	Category	Result	Ref.
2008	Saturn Awards	Cloverfield	Filmmakers Showcase Award	Won	
2010	Fright Meter Awards	Let Me In	Best Screenplay	Won	
2010	Fright Meter Awards	Let Me In	Best Director	Nominated	
2010	Gotham Independent Film Awards	Let Me In	Best Feature	Nominated	
2011	Saturn Awards	Let Me In	Best Director	Nominated	
2011	Saturn Awards	Let Me In	Best Writing	Nominated	
2014	Rondo Hatton Classic Horror Awards	Dawn of the Planet of the Apes	Best Film	Nominated	
2015	Saturn Awards	Dawn of the Planet of the Apes	Best Director	Nominated	
2015	Empire Awards	Dawn of the Planet of the Apes	Best Director	Nominated	
2018	Saturn Awards	War for the Planet of the Apes	Best Director	Nominated	
2022	Hollywood Critics Association Midseason Film Awards	The Batman	Best Director	Nominated	
2022	Hollywood Critics Association Midseason Film Awards	The Batman	Best Screenplay	Nominated	
2022	Saturn Awards	The Batman	Best Director	Won	
2022	Saturn Awards	The Batman	Best Writing	Nominated	
2025	Golden Globe Awards	The Penguin	Best Limited or Anthology Series or Television Film	Nominated	
2025	Critics' Choice Awards	The Penguin	Best Movie/Miniseries	Nominated	
2025	Producers Guild of America Awards	The Penguin	Best Limited or Anthology Series Television	Nominated	
2025	Primetime Emmy Awards	The Penguin	Outstanding Limited or Anthology Series	Nominated	
