= Harbour (novel) =

2008 novel by John Ajvide Lindqvist

- Swedish book cover
- Author: John Ajvide Lindqvist
- Original title: Människohamn
- Translator: Marlaine Delargy
- Language: Swedish
- Genre: Horror
- Publisher: Quercus Publishing
- Publication place: Sweden
- English publication date: 2010-09-30
- ISBN: 978-1-84916-511-2

Harbour (Swedish: Människohamn) is a 2008 horror/drama novel by Swedish writer John Ajvide Lindqvist about a cursed island called Domarö in the Stockholm archipelago.

== Plot introduction ==
The story follows Anders whose young daughter goes missing one winter day. He, his wife, and their six-year-old daughter, Maja, visit a lighthouse on an archipelago. Thinking no one was around, they let her run on ahead. She disappears, and was never found.

Two years later, a now alcoholic and divorced Anders returns to the island that was once the home of his childhood and family. The novel also follows Anders' step grandfather on the island, the illusionist Simon, who is starting to notice that there is something strange with the island and the sea itself.

== Author's device ==
John Ajvide Lindqvist has said that the one concept he wanted to use in his novel from the start was that of using two ghosts driving around on a moped and speaking only in The Smiths quotes.
