= Border (2018 Swedish film) =

2018 Swedish fantasy film

- Theatrical release poster
- Swedish: Gräns
- Directed by: Ali Abbasi
- Screenplay by: Ali Abbasi; Isabella Eklöf; John Ajvide Lindqvist
- Based on: "Border" by John Ajvide Lindqvist
- Produced by: Nina Bisgaard; Peter Gustafsson; Petra Jonsson
- Starring: Eva Melander; Eero Milonoff; Jörgen Thorsson; Ann Petrén; Sten Ljunggren
- Cinematography: Nadim Carlsen
- Edited by: Olivia Neergaard-Holm; Anders Skov
- Music by: Christoffer Berg; Martin Derkov
- Production companies: META Film; Black Spark Film & TV; Karnfilm
- Distributed by: TriArt Film
- Release dates: 10 May 2018 (Cannes); 31 August 2018 (Sweden)
- Running time: 110 minutes
- Country: Sweden
- Language: Swedish
- Box office: $2.2 million

Border (Swedish: Gräns) is a 2018 Swedish fantasy film directed by Ali Abbasi with a screenplay by Abbasi, Isabella Eklöf and John Ajvide Lindqvist based on the short story of the same name by Lindqvist from his anthology Let the Old Dreams Die. It won the Un Certain Regard award at the 2018 Cannes Film Festival, and was selected as the Swedish entry for the Best Foreign Language Film at the 91st Academy Awards but was not nominated. However, it was nominated for Best Makeup and Hairstyling.

== Plot ==
Tina works for the Swedish Customs Service and uses her heightened olfactory sense to detect contraband, as well as human emotions such as guilt and shame. She has a strongly Neanderthalic appearance and lives in a secluded house in the woods with Roland, a dog trainer. One day at the border, Tina sniffs out a memory card containing child pornography, and her superior asks her to help with the subsequent investigation.

The next day, a strange man with facial features similar to Tina's appears at customs. His bag is revealed to contain maggots and a device that the man claims is a maggot incubator. Tina lets him pass, but he soon returns and volunteers to be strip searched. Tina is taken aback when she learns that the man has female genitalia and a large scar on his tailbone similar to one she herself has. The man introduces himself as Vore and states that he will be staying in a nearby hostel.

Tina goes to a nursing home to see her father, who does not look like her. Upon being asked about the origin of her scar, Tina's father tells her she fell on something as a small child. She then visits the hostel where she finds Vore eating maggots off a tree. He gives her one, which she eats. Tina offers him a room in her guest house, and he accepts. Tina brings him home. He tries to kiss her. Roland's suspicions are aroused.

Tina accompanies the police when they search the apartment where the suspected pedophiles live and detects a camera with footage of an infant being sexually abused. The police arrest the occupants but cannot identify who is trafficking the infants.

During a thunderstorm, Vore enters Tina's house, and the two huddle under a table, terrified by the lightning. They finally kiss. Tina later confesses that she has a chromosome deformity which makes it difficult for her to have sex and impossible to bear children. Vore tells her that it's not a deformity, and she should ignore what humans say about her. Tina is astonished as an erect penis emerges from her groin. The two have sex, after which Vore tells Tina that she is a troll, just like he is, and that he is hoping to get in contact with a group of trolls who maintain a furtive existence in Finland.

Tina is excited by her newfound identity and begins living more like a troll, finally mustering the courage to evict Roland. She notices that Vore has taped his refrigerator shut. Upon opening it, she finds a strange infant in a cardboard box. Vore tells Tina that the baby is a hiisi, an unfertilized troll embryo that will soon die. Vore plans to use the hiisi as a changeling and is waiting to secretly replace a real human infant with the dying troll embryo.

While one of the arrested pedophiles is being transferred, Vore stops the van and kills him. He tells Tina it was to prevent him from telling the police that it was he, Vore, who was trafficking human infants. He also confesses that the infant trafficking is part of a plot by trolls to get their revenge on humans for all the trolls that humans tortured in the 1970s. This disturbs Tina, who believes that past human mistreatment of trolls does not justify such vengeful acts.

The next day, Tina's neighbors call for an ambulance because their baby is ailing. Unbeknownst to them, it is not their child, but a changeling. Realizing that Vore has followed through on his planned deception, Tina goes to the guest house. Vore and his belongings are gone, but he has left a note instructing Tina to meet him on the ferry. She finds him on the deck. She explains that her compassion towards humans doesn't mean she is one herself and that trolls are capable of compassion too. She signals to the police, who close in and handcuff Vore, but he manages to escape by jumping overboard. His body is not found.

Tina's father finally tells her the truth about who she is: that he used to work as a caretaker at a psychiatric hospital where trolls were tortured and experimented on; that it was from there that he adopted Tina, whose original troll name was Reva, to raise as a human; and that her real troll parents are dead and that he knows where they are buried. Later, Tina drives to the old hospital and finds her parents' graves.

A few months later, Tina finds a parcel on her porch. Inside are a troll infant and a postcard from Finland.

== Cast ==
- Eva Melander as Tina
- Eero Milonoff as Vore
- Viktor Åkerblom as Ulf
- Matti Boustedt as Tomas
- Jörgen Thorsson as Roland
- Andreas Kundler as Robert
- Rakel Wärmländer as Therese
- Ann Petrén as Agneta
- Sten Ljunggren as Tina's father
- Kjell Wilhelmsen as Daniel

== Production ==
John Ajvide Lindqvist wrote the first draft of the screenplay, and then Abassi hired Isabella Eklöf to add more "psychological realism" to the story. Casting for the film took 18 months. To transform into the character of Tina, Eva Melander gained a considerable amount of weight and wore prosthetics that took four hours each day to apply.

The port scenes were filmed at Kapellskär.

== Release ==
Border screened at Cannes, where it won the 2018 Un Certain Regard award, Telluride, and the Toronto International Film Festival. The director Abbasi holds an Iranian passport, which could have prevented him from traveling to the United States due to a travel ban, but he was granted a rare exception to attend the Telluride Festival.

American actress Aubrey Plaza became such a fan of the movie that she held a private screening for about 60 of her friends, and promoted it during an appearance on the Conan talkshow.

== Reception ==
=== Box office ===
Border grossed $771,930 in the United States and Canada, and $1.4 million in other territories, for a worldwide total of $2.2 million, plus $110,829 with home video sales.

=== Critical response ===
On review aggregator Rotten Tomatoes, the film holds an approval rating of 97%, based on 130 reviews, and an average rating of 7.9/10. The website's critics consensus reads, "Thrilling, unpredictable, and brilliantly acted, Border (Gräns) offers a singular treat to genre fans looking for something different." On Metacritic, the film has a weighted average score of 75 out of 100, based on 25 critics, indicating "generally favorable reviews".

Alissa Simon of Variety described the film as "an exciting, intelligent mix of romance, Nordic noir, social realism, and supernatural horror that defies and subverts genre conventions," and Stephen Dalton of The Hollywood Reporter wrote, "A couple of sharp curveball additions to Lindqvist's original plot also elevate Border beyond genre trappings and into stranger, sadder, more generally relatable territory."

=== Accolades ===
Award	Date of ceremony	Category	Recipient(s)	Result
Academy Awards	24 February 2019	Best Makeup and Hairstyling	Göran Lundström and Pamela Goldammer	Nominated
Cannes Film Festival	8–19 May 2018	Un Certain Regard	Ali Abbasi	Won
Guldbagge Awards	28 January 2019	Best Film	Nina Bisgaard, Piodor Gustafsson and Petra Jönsson (producers)	Won
Guldbagge Awards	28 January 2019	Best Director	Ali Abbasi	Nominated
Guldbagge Awards	28 January 2019	Best Actress	Eva Melander	Won
Guldbagge Awards	28 January 2019	Best Supporting Actor	Eero Milonoff	Won
Guldbagge Awards	28 January 2019	Best Screenplay	Ali Abbasi, Isabella Eklöf and John Ajvide Lindqvist	Nominated
Guldbagge Awards	28 January 2019	Best Editing	Olivia Neergaard-Holm and Anders Skov	Nominated
Guldbagge Awards	28 January 2019	Best Sound Editing	Christian Holm	Won
Guldbagge Awards	28 January 2019	Best Makeup and Hair	Göran Lundström, Pamela Goldammer and Erica Spetzig	Won
Guldbagge Awards	28 January 2019	Best Visual Effects	Peter Hjorth	Won
Los Angeles Film Festival	28 September 2018	World Fiction Award	Border	Won

== See also ==
- List of submissions to the 91st Academy Awards for Best Foreign Language Film
- List of Swedish submissions for the Academy Award for Best Foreign Language Film
