= Hilda Fay =

Irish actor

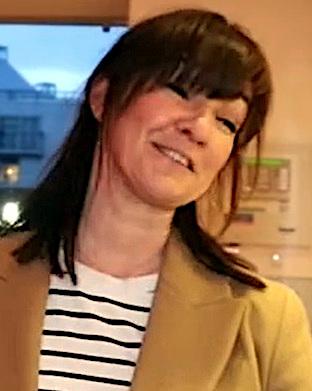
- Fay in 2022
- Born: 1973 (age 52–53); Dublin
- Occupation: actor
- Known for: playing Tracey McGuigan in the Irish soap opera Fair City

Hilda Fay is an Irish actor. She was nominated for an IFTA for best supporting actress for her role in Whistleblower in 2009 and again in 2024 for Showtime / BBC “The woman in the wall” alongside Ruth Wilson.

She graduated from Trinity College, Dublin's Samuel Beckett Centre. Her last stage appearance was playing 2 leads, Juno Boyle and Bessie Burgess in Druids Sean O Casey Trilogy American tour. She has appeared on stage in the Gate Theatre's "Threpenny Opera" Abbey Theatre's productions Little Gem (Gúna Nua), which won the Carol Tambor award "the best of Edinburagh; she also shared the best actress award in the dublin fringe. She appeared in The Playboy of the Western World and "The Risen People" by james plunket. "Perve" Stacy Gregg, Roddy Doyle’s adaptation of in The Woman Who Walked into Doors at the Olympia, Lady Macbeth in Macbeth at the Mill Theatre. Wayne Jordan's "Oedipus" at the Abbey, and "Tina's idea of fun" by Sean P Summers at the Peacock. She is best known for playing Tracey McGuigan in the Irish soap opera Fair City.

She was nominated twice in the category Best Actress in a Supporting Role in Television at the 6th Irish Film and Television Awards for her role in Whistleblower and again in 2024 for BBC/Showtime “The woman in the wall” She has also appeared in Finbar's Class, Ordinary Decent Criminal, Saltwater, Though the Sky Falls, Let the Wrong One In, Proof, Prosperity, On the Street Where You Live and The Clinic.

She married her fiancé Alan Vale in 2007 and has 2 daughters Pearl and Nancy.

In 2016 she toured North America with the Abbey theatres 100 year anniversary production of "Plough and the Stars" playing Bessie Burges in which she was named in the 10 top performances in Boston of that year " Float like a butterfly'" Friprisci prize winner at Tiff for Samson films, " The cured" Tilted Pictures 2017. In 2018/19 she appeared in Roddy Doyle's World premier of "The snapper" at the Gate theatre. Enda O Briens 2022 production at the Abbey theatre of "Joyces Women" . Reacurring role in Showtime/BBC "Woman in the wall" alongside Ruth Wilson and Apple TV’s "Shantarum" with Charlie Hunham. 2023. “House of Guinness” Netflix 2024, “Trespassers” 2024
