= Let Me In (film) =

2010 romantic horror film

- Theatrical release poster
- Directed by: Matt Reeves
- Screenplay by: Matt Reeves
- Based on: Låt den rätte komma in (novel) and Låt den rätte komma in (film) by John Ajvide Lindqvist
- Produced by: Alex Brunner; Simon Oakes; Guy East; Tobin Armbrust; Donna Gigliotti; John Nordling; Carl Molinder
- Starring: Kodi Smit-McPhee; Chloë Grace Moretz; Elias Koteas; Richard Jenkins
- Cinematography: Greig Fraser
- Edited by: Stan Salfas
- Music by: Michael Giacchino
- Production companies: Exclusive Media Group; Hammer Films; EFTI
- Distributed by: Overture Films and Relativity Media (United States); Paramount Pictures and Icon Film Distribution (United Kingdom)
- Release dates: September 13, 2010 (TIFF); October 1, 2010 (United States); November 5, 2010 (United Kingdom)
- Running time: 116 minutes
- Countries: United Kingdom; United States
- Language: English
- Budget: $20 million
- Box office: $27 million

Let Me In is a 2010 romantic horror film written and directed by Matt Reeves. It is a remake of the 2008 Swedish film Let the Right One In, which was based on the 2004 novel of the same name by John Ajvide Lindqvist. The film stars Kodi Smit-McPhee, Chloë Grace Moretz, Elias Koteas, and Richard Jenkins. The plot follows a bullied 12-year-old boy who befriends and develops a romantic relationship with a child vampire girl in Los Alamos, New Mexico, during the early 1980s.

Interest in producing an English-language version of Let the Right One In began in 2007, shortly before the Swedish film was released. In 2008, Hammer Films acquired the rights for the English adaptation and initially offered Tomas Alfredson, the director of the original film, the opportunity to direct, which he declined. Reeves was then signed to direct and write the screenplay. Reeves made several changes for the English version, such as altering the setting from Stockholm to Los Alamos and renaming the lead characters. The film's producers stated that their intent was to keep the plot similar to the original, yet make it more accessible to a wider audience. Principal photography began in early November 2009 and concluded in January 2010.

Let Me In premiered at the 2010 Toronto International Film Festival on September 13, 2010, and was released in the United States on October 1 by Overture Films and in the United Kingdom on November 5 by Icon Film Distribution. The film received positive reviews from critics, being placed on several top ten lists of best films of the year. Many critics noted it as a rare English-language remake which stayed true to the original, while others criticized it for being too derivative of the Swedish film. It earned $27 million worldwide against a production budget of $20 million.

== Plot ==
In March 1983, in Los Alamos, New Mexico, a disfigured man is taken to the hospital. An unnamed police detective tries to question him about a recent murder. While the detective answers a call outside the room, the disfigured man jumps out of the window, leaving behind a note that reads: "I'M SORY ABBY".

Two weeks earlier, Owen, a lonely and unhappy 12-year-old boy who is neglected by his divorcing parents, sees a barefoot little girl named Abby and an older man moving in next door. At school, a teenage bully named Kenny and two of his friends constantly terrorize Owen, who lies to his mother about it but tells Abby the truth. Abby encourages him to retaliate, and pledges to protect him. Owen and Abby become close friends and start communicating by Morse code through the walls of their apartments.

Abby's companion Thomas abducts a local teenager and drains the boy's blood into a jug, only to accidentally spill all of its contents. Starving, Abby attacks a neighbor and drinks his blood, killing him and forcing Thomas to dispose of the body.

On a later night, Thomas hides in the back of another car, but is discovered. In the ensuing struggle, the car falls into a ditch and flips over. Trapped, Thomas pours concentrated sulfuric acid on his face, leading to his hospitalization.

Abby learns what happened and visits Thomas in the hospital, who lets her drink his blood before falling to his death. That night, Owen is awakened by Abby, who insists he verbally invite her in. After removing her clothes, she spends the night in his bed and agrees to be his girlfriend.

The next day, Owen's class goes ice skating on a frozen river. Cornered by the bullies, Owen smashes the side of Kenny’s head with a metal pole, splitting his left ear. At the same time, the students find the neighbor's body encased in the ice.

Later, Owen tries to make a blood pact with Abby. Seeing blood, Abby reveals her vampire form and flees, feeding on another neighbor, but fails to kill her before she has to escape. The next night, when Owen comes to see her, she admits that she is a vampire and Thomas was not her father. Owen discovers an aged photo of her with Thomas as a young boy. Scared, Owen wants to leave but is stopped by Abby, who will not answer when he asks what she will do to him; she finally lets him leave.

The neighbor Abby left alive is turned into a vampire and burns to death in the hospital when a nurse opens the curtain to reveal sunlight. That night, Abby visits Owen's apartment and asks if she can come in; when he asks what will happen without his permission, she steps inside and starts bleeding all over. Horrified, he invites her in and hugs her, then helps her to wash off the blood and don one of his mother's old dresses. When his mother nearly catches them, Abby flees out the window; Owen later sneaks out to spend the night at her apartment.

In the morning, the detective forces his way into Abby's apartment and finds her asleep, only to be distracted by Owen. Abby wakes and attacks the detective, killing him. Horrified at her actions, Abby decides to leave town and kisses a heartbroken Owen goodbye.

During swim class, Kenny, his older brother Jimmy, and their friends set a dumpster on fire to distract the teacher, then ambush Owen and begin to drown him; Abby returns to rescue Owen and dismember his tormentors. An unspecified time later, Owen leaves town on a train, concealing Abby in a large trunk.

== Cast ==
- Kodi Smit-McPhee as Owen, a 12-year-old bullied schoolboy, later Abby's boyfriend
- Chloë Grace Moretz as Abby, a vampire who poses as Thomas' daughter, later Owen's girlfriend
- Elias Koteas as a detective investigating the murders caused by Abby
  - Koteas also provides the voice of Owen's father
- Cara Buono as Owen's mother
- Sasha Barrese as Virginia, one of Abby's victims
- Richard Jenkins as Thomas, Abby's adult companion
- Dylan Minnette as Kenny, a bully who torments Owen
- Ritchie Coster as Mr. Zorić
- Jimmy Jax Pinchak as Mark, one of Kenny's friends
- Nicolai Dorian as Donald, one of Kenny's friends
- Colin Moretz as Cashier
- Dylan Kenin as Larry, Virginia's boyfriend
- Brett DelBuono as Jimmy, the older brother of Kenny
- Chris Browning as Jack, one of Abby's victims

== Production ==
=== Development ===
According to Hammer Films executive producer Nigel Sinclair, interest in the project initially began in the middle of 2007, before the original Let the Right One In had screened for audiences.

The rights for the English-language film were later acquired by Hammer Films at the 2008 Tribeca Film Festival, where Let the Right One In won the "Founders Award for Best Narrative Feature," and Matt Reeves was quickly introduced as the director. John Nordling and Carl Molinder, the Swedish producers of the original film, were both involved as producers for the adaptation. Tomas Alfredson, the director of the Swedish film, was initially asked to direct the remake, but he turned it down stating that "I am too old to make the same film twice and I have other stories that I want to tell." Hammer Films producer Simon Oakes initially referred to the film with "If you call it a faithful remake, I think that's true to say that's what it is. It's not a reimagining; the same beats [are there], maybe the scares are a little bit more scary." He later said, "I call it his [Reeves'] version. I don't call it his remake or his re-imagining of it." The decision to make a new film adaptation has been criticized by Tomas Alfredson. He has stated on numerous occasions that he is not in favor of remaking his film. "If one should remake a film, it's because the original is bad. And I don't think mine is," he said. Producer Donna Gigliotti said, "We're incredibly admiring of the original, but to be honest with you, that picture grossed $2 million. It's not like we're remaking Lawrence of Arabia." Producer Simon Oakes made it clear that the plot of Let Me In would closely resemble that of the original film, except that it will be made "very accessible to a wider audience."

Writer John Ajvide Lindqvist, on the other hand, says that Reeves told him that he "will make a new film based on the book, and not remake the Swedish film" and so "it'll be something completely different, but it's going to be really interesting to see." Reeves expressed his intent to retain the book's early 1980s setting and his admiration for the book and Alfredson's adaptation. "It's a terrific movie and a fantastic book. I think it could be a really touching, haunting and terrifying film. I'm really excited about what it could be", he said. In response to the criticism he said, "I can understand because of people's love of the [original] film that there's this cynicism that I'll come in and trash it, when in fact I have nothing but respect for the film. I'm so drawn to it for personal and not mercenary reasons ... I hope people give us a chance." When Reeves was initially approached, he at first was against the idea but after reading the novel gained a better appreciation for the story, stating,

I said ... that we shouldn't remake it. I read the book too and was completely taken with it and I was really intrigued how personal the story felt. I thought John Lindqvist had written this terrific story, and he also adapted it for the film ... I wrote Lindqvist and told him that it wasn't just that I was drawn to the story because it was a brilliant genre story—which it is—but also because of the personal aspect of it. It really reminds me of my childhood.

=== Adapting and writing ===
In adapting the film, a few adjustments were made, such as changing the names of the protagonists to Owen and Abby, and moving the setting from the Stockholm suburb of Blackeberg to "a small New Mexico town." Reeves was also asked to change the ages of the main characters, but he refused, saying that "would ruin the essence of the story and change everything completely ... we need that childlike innocence." He also told his actors to not watch the original film beforehand so "we could make our own version but stay very true to the essence of the story." The filmmakers have noted that "they intend to forge a unique identity for Let Me In, placing it firmly in an American context", while at the same time paying respect to the original. In comparing his adaptation to the Swedish one, Reeves admitted to not adding many different details from the book that weren't in the original film, stating that "the story was so big that you couldn't really add a lot of stuff in without taking away the focus of the coming of age story so I tried to have allusions and references to stuff in the book." Reeves also admitted to borrowing elements from the Swedish film, stating "There are things that [Lindqvist] adapted brilliantly in the movie and I borrowed from that because I thought he did a great adaptation. But there are some things that hopefully don't detract and fit into the context of the story. It's a mixture of details from the book, the original film and things that grew out of adapting it." In adapting the story for American audiences, Reeves stated that keeping the 1980s time period within the film was critical in exploring the theme of good and evil. He used Ronald Reagan's "evil empire speech" as an example of American thought during that period. Reeves stated, "The idea of Reagan's 'evil empire' speech and that whole sort of school of thought was that evil was something that was outside of us. Evil was 'Other,' it was over there, it was the Soviets". Reeves felt that this idea was central to the main character Owen, as he "would be grappling with these very, very dark feelings but being in a kind of American town where there was that sort of [Reagan era] mindset and religiousness. How would you fit in? How would you feel about yourself being confused and being 12 or 13 years old and not knowing what it means that you wish you could kill those kids who were terrorizing you every day? The humanity of that."

=== Casting ===
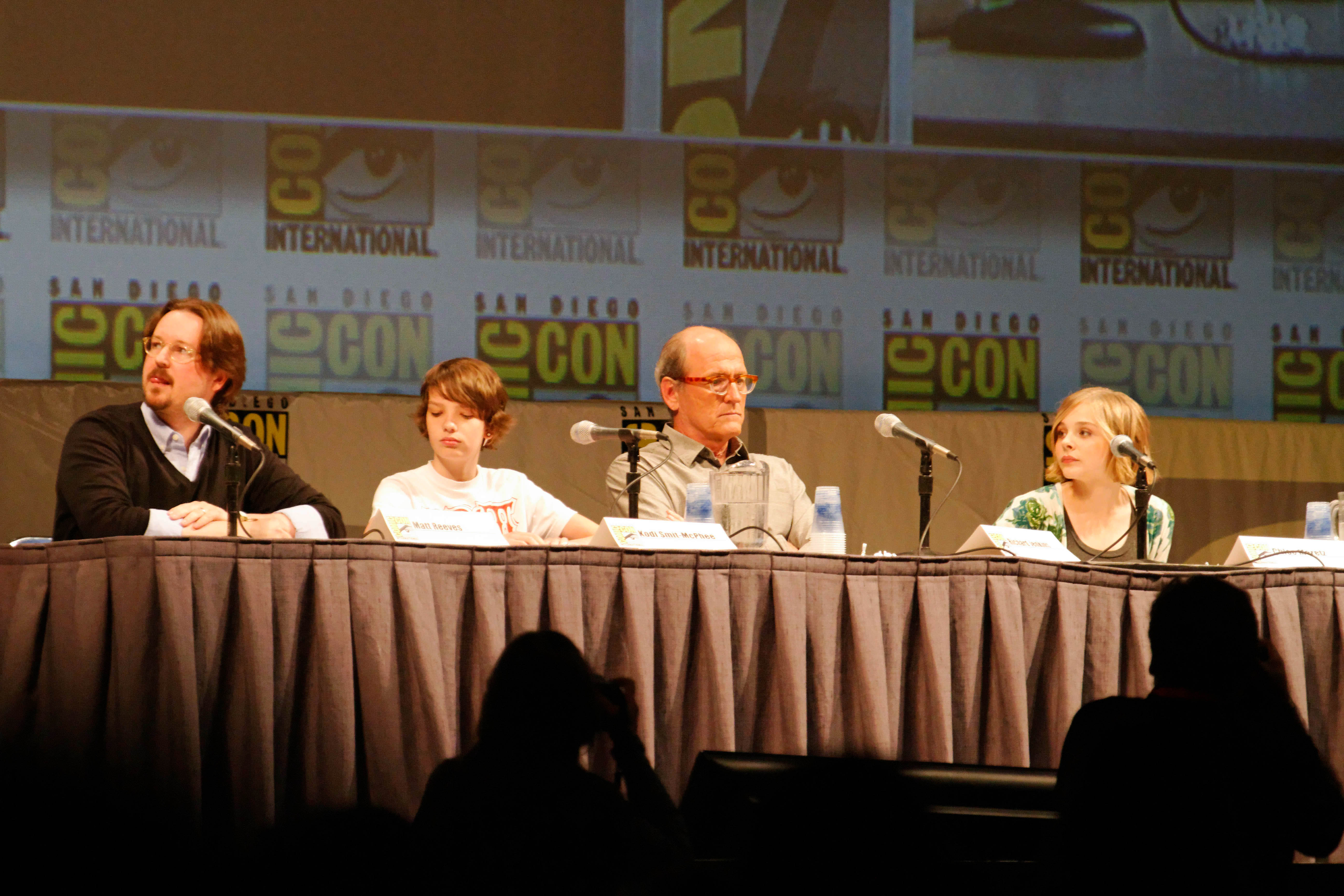
Matt Reeves, Kodi Smit-McPhee, Richard Jenkins, and Chloë Grace Moretz at Comic-Con discussing Let Me In.

In July 2009, audition tapes were leaked to the Internet, showing Chloë Grace Moretz, Mary Mouser, and Ariel Winter auditioning for the role of the vampire, Abby. Smit-McPhee, in an interview with The Herald Sun, hinted that he may have landed the role as Owen. The casting of Moretz and Smit-McPhee in the leading roles was confirmed on October 1, 2009, along with the addition of Richard Jenkins as Abby's adult companion.

In a press release, director Matt Reeves described Smit-McPhee, Moretz and Jenkins as his "absolute dream cast", and added that he "couldn't be more excited to be working with them." Both Smit-McPhee and Moretz were cast before the release of The Road or Kick-Ass, and the films' directors John Hillcoat and Matthew Vaughn, respectively, each praised the young actors and recommended them to Reeves.

Chloe's older brother, Colin Moretz was also cast in a minor role as the cashier at the convenience store.

=== Filming ===
Principal photography began in Albuquerque, New Mexico on November 2, 2009. Filming took place in several different New Mexico locations, before concluding in Albuquerque in January 2010. A large section of the film was filmed at Los Alamos High School in Los Alamos, New Mexico. Los Alamos County granted a special request from the film's director and producer to name the town in the movie "Los Alamos, New Mexico." Over 100 local teenagers were cast as extras.

Reeves felt that Lindqvist's story was very naturalistic and wanted the film to be shot the same way. After viewing Bright Star, he hired Greig Fraser as his cinematographer because he admired Fraser's work with natural light on the film. Shortly before filming, Reeves sought advice from Steven Spielberg for directing child actors. Spielberg instructed Reeves to have the two leads each keep a diary in character with the intention of sharing with Reeves what they wrote in it. Reeves stated, "It was all a process of trying to, not only guide them, but in places, trying to let them guide me toward their perspective. That was important."

=== Visual effects ===
Moretz wore minimal prosthetic blood applied to her face for reference (left); visual effects artists later rendered the gradual release of blood in post-production (right).

Method Studios was contracted to handle the film's visual effects work. The studio's supervisor Sean Faden, worked alongside the film's visual effects supervisor, Brad Parker throughout the production.

Several of the film's scenes proved to be a challenge for the team. Director Reeves wanted the "car-crash" sequence to appear as if it were filmed uncut in first-person. Several plates were shot, with the first plate involving actor Jenkins backing the car out of the gas station and swerving, and the second plate shot had a model of the car capable of being spun mechanically on a "rotisserie" in front of a blue screen which could simulate the car's roll down the hill. Jenkins' stunt double and a dummy were placed in the car as the rotisserie spun with additional effects work used to animate the dummy as the car rolled. The two shots were then combined to deceive the viewer into believing that it was one complete shot.

Houdini software was used for much of the film's shots which involved Abby in her vampiric form. Faden noted the techniques used in another challenging shot important to Abby's character in which she begins bleeding when she enters Owen's apartment without invitation. Faden stated, "Normally in such a scene, the character would be shot on set, dressed in blood. But in this case, the timing of the bleeding was so dependent on the emotional beats of the scene that this technique wouldn't have allowed us enough control." Actress Chloë Grace Moretz was first shot with minimal prosthetic blood applied to her face for reference. Then using techniques utilized in a prior Method Studios film, A Nightmare on Elm Street, Faden had the Houdini software track Moretz's shaking movements and render the gradual release of blood from her face.

=== Music and soundtrack ===
Let Me In: Original Motion Picture Soundtrack is the film's soundtrack album. It was released by Varèse Sarabande on October 12, 2010. The score was composed by Michael Giacchino. Giacchino stated that scoring the film was a difficult "balancing act" for some scenes. He mentioned, "I was always trying to say, 'let's take music out!' and Matt [Reeves] was like, 'no, put it in!'" In composing the score, he stated that he also applied certain musical themes to each character for which the audience could respond to as the story progressed. Composing the score to convey the correct emotion was also a challenge for Giacchino who said, "... it was tricky finding the right balance of, well, should this be scary? Or should this be sentimental? Or should it be emotional? Or should it be this? It was a weird balance because you're dealing with a dynamic that is quite questionable as far as what everyone's intentions are in the film.

== Release ==
It was announced on August 17, 2010, that Let Me In would have its world premiere at Toronto International Film Festival on September 13, 2010, and its U.S. premiere on the opening night of Fantastic Fest on September 23, 2010. Overture Films released promotional items placed in small plastic evidence bags.

== Reception ==
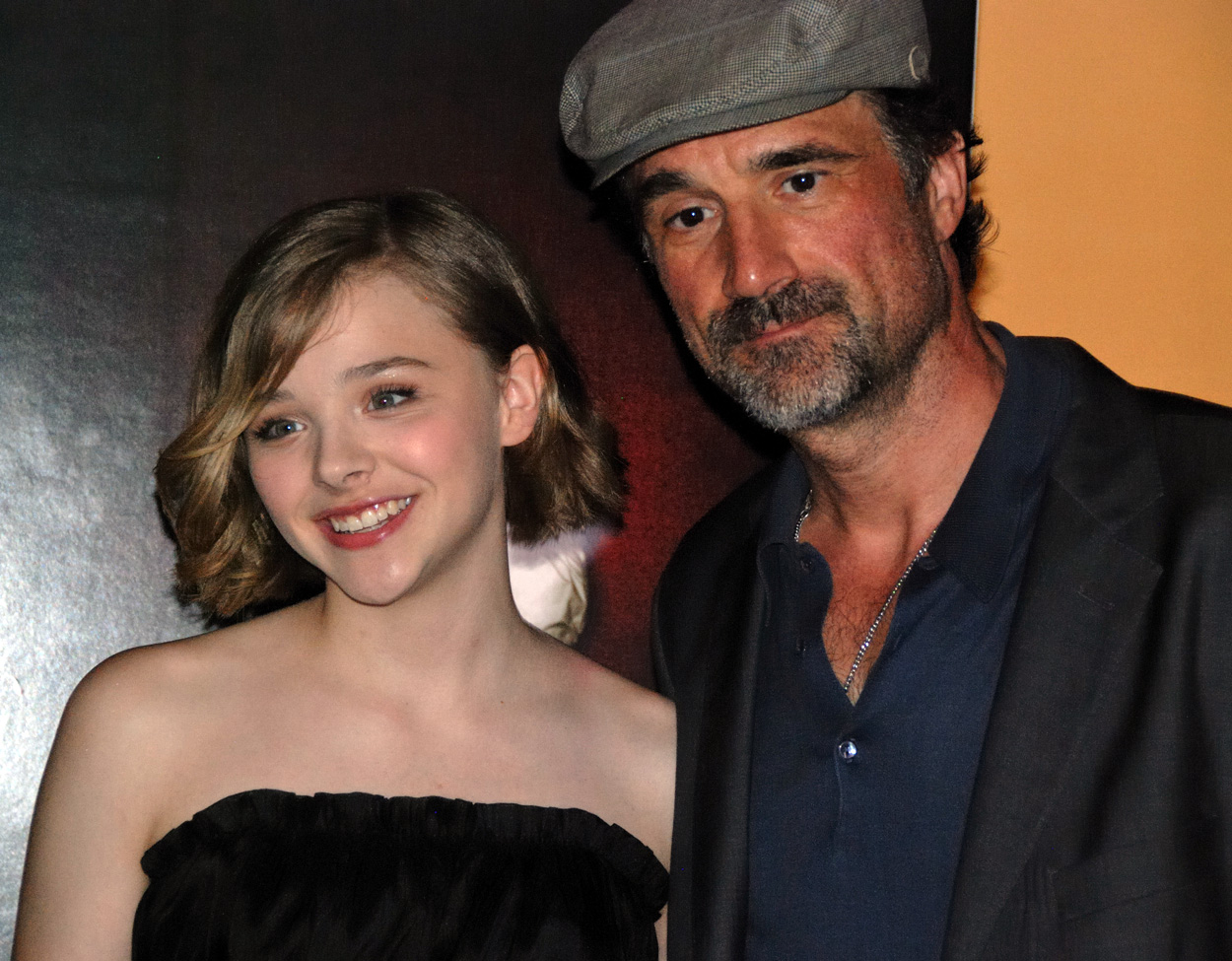
Chloë Grace Moretz and Elias Koteas during the New York premiere of Let Me In at the SVA Theater on September 30, 2010

With a budget estimated to be $20 million, the film was released on October 1, 2010, in North America opening at #8 on its debut weekend with an estimated $5.1 million in 2,020 theaters. The film's international release began on October 6 in European markets with other markets following thereafter. During the film's ten-week theatrical run, Let Me In grossed over $24 million worldwide, $12.1 million of which was from the United States and Canada. The film was fifth among the ten lowest-grossing releases of 2010 from major studios (movies released in over 1,500 theaters).

=== Critical response ===
Smit-McPhee and Moretz as Owen and Abby were praised by critics for their chemistry and maturity on-screen.

Let Me In received critical acclaim upon release. Review aggregation website Rotten Tomatoes gives the film a score of 88% based on reviews from 234 critics, with an average score of 7.5/10. The website's critical consensus reads: "Similar to the original in all the right ways—but with enough changes to stand on its own—Let Me In is the rare Hollywood remake that doesn't add insult to inspiration." Let Me In was included on Rotten Tomatoes list of the ten best reviewed wide-release films of 2010 in addition to being the best reviewed horror film of 2010. Metacritic gave the film an average score of 79/100 based on 35 reviews, judged to be "generally favorable" reviews. According to Metacritic, Let Me In was one of the ten best-reviewed wide-release films of 2010, as well as the best reviewed film of the year in the horror category. Audiences polled by CinemaScore gave the film an average grade of C+ on an A+ to F scale.

Particular praise was given to the film's two leads, Smit-McPhee and Moretz, for their chemistry and maturity on-screen.

Acclaimed horror author Stephen King wrote "Let Me In is a genre-busting triumph. Not just a horror film, but the best American horror film in the last 20 years." Joe Morgenstern of The Wall Street Journal wrote that the film "is more than a respectful remake; Let Me In is quietly stylish and thoroughly chilling in its own right."

A. O. Scott of The New York Times wrote "what makes Let Me In so eerily fascinating is the mood it creates. It is at once artful and unpretentious, more interested in intimacy and implication than in easy scares or slick effects". Roger Ebert of the Chicago Sun-Times praised the film while comparing it to the original. He stated, "Reeves understands what made the first film so eerie and effective, and here the same things work again." Rolling Stone film critic Peter Travers, who was initially skeptical, gave the film a positive review while writing, "I thought for sure that any Hollywood remake of Tomas Alfredson's artful Swedish vampire film, Let the Right One In, would be a crass desecration. Well, color me blushing... Prepare to be wowed. It's a spellbinder." Roger Moore of the Orlando Sentinel gave the film 3.5 out of 4 stars, stating, "Reeves has Americanized a very good foreign film without defanging it."

Let Me In was not well received by all critics. Some disputed Reeves' claims that he was not remaking the film but re-adapting the book, criticizing it for being too similar to the Swedish film. Josh Tyler of CinemaBlend wrote, "The movie he's made is absolutely a direct remake of the 2008 film, the two are so similar that it's almost impossible to differentiate between them." In a similar vein, Jamie S. Rich of DVD Talk noted that while there was plenty of content in the original novel that the Swedish film omitted, "Reeves hasn't really ferreted out anything new; on the contrary, there is actually less plot in Let Me In than in the Alfredson version." Beth Accomando wrote, "How Reeves can take the credit 'written and directed by Matt Reeves' seems almost laughable when you note how similar the script and the direction are to the original." In comparing the two films, she opined that the remake "makes obvious all that the original film made subtle and does so with less complexity". Mark Kermode called it "the most utterly redundant remake of the year".

According to Sukhdev Sandhu of The Daily Telegraph, "Let Me In doesn't need to exist unless, that is, the very notion of Swedish cinema is strange and unpalatable to you ... What's missing is the alluring otherness of Let the Right One In. That film's brittle textures and haunted ambiance seemed in some strange way to have sprung organically from the nation in which it was set. This remake, by contrast, smells of boardrooms and calculating machines."

Let Me In was a critics' pick as one of the Top 10 Best Films of 2010 at CNN and at MSN Entertainment for the 2010 Year in Review Special Features.

=== Accolades ===
Award	Category	Recipient(s) and nominee(s)	Result
Austin Film Critics Association Awards	Breakthrough Artist	Chloë Grace Moretz	Won
Central Ohio Film Critics Association Awards	Actor of the Year	Chloë Grace Moretz	Nominated
Central Ohio Film Critics Association Awards	Best Overlooked Film	Let Me In	Nominated
Central Ohio Film Critics Association Awards	Breakthrough Film Artist	Chloë Grace Moretz	Won
Critics' Choice Movie Awards	Best Young Actor/Actress	Chloë Grace Moretz	Nominated
Critics' Choice Movie Awards	Best Young Actor/Actress	Kodi Smit-McPhee	Nominated
Detroit Film Critics Society Awards	Breakthrough Performance	Chloë Grace Moretz	Nominated
Empire Awards	Best Horror	Let Me In	Nominated
Empire Awards	Best Newcomer	Chloë Grace Moretz	Won
Golden Reel Awards	Best Sound Editing: Feature Film Music	Let Me In	Nominated
Golden Tomato Awards	Best Horror	Let Me In	Won
Golden Tomato Awards	Best Wide Release	Let Me In	Nominated
Gotham Awards	Best Feature	Let Me In	Nominated
National Board of Review Awards	Top Independent Films	Let Me In	Won
People's Choice Awards	Favorite Horror Movie	Let Me In	Nominated
Phoenix Film Critics Society Awards	Best Young Actor	Kodi Smit-McPhee	Won
Phoenix Film Critics Society Awards	Best Young Actress	Chloë Grace Moretz	Nominated
Phoenix Film Critics Society Awards	Overlooked Film	Let Me In	Nominated
Richard Attenborough Film Awards	Rising Star	Chloë Grace Moretz	Won
Saturn Awards	Best Director	Matt Reeves	Nominated
Saturn Awards	Best Horror Film	Let Me In	Won
Saturn Awards	Best Make-up	Let Me In	Nominated
Saturn Awards	Best Music	Michael Giacchino	Nominated
Saturn Awards	Best Performance by a Younger Actor	Chloë Grace Moretz	Won
Saturn Awards	Best Performance by a Younger Actor	Kodi Smit-McPhee	Nominated
Saturn Awards	Best Writing	Matt Reeves	Nominated
Scream Awards	Best Horror Actress	Chloë Grace Moretz	Won
Scream Awards	Best Horror Movie	Let Me In	Won
Teen Choice Awards	Best Horror Movie	Let Me In	Nominated
Young Artist Awards	Best Ensemble Cast	Let Me In	Nominated
Young Artist Awards	Best Supporting Actor	Dylan Minnette	Nominated

=== Author's response ===
John Ajvide Lindqvist, author of the book and screenwriter of the original Swedish film, was pleased with Let Me In. He said:

I might just be the luckiest writer alive. To have not only one, but two excellent versions of my debut novel done for the screen feels unreal. Let the Right One In is a great Swedish movie. Let Me In is a great American movie. There are notable similarities and the spirit of Tomas Alfredson is present. But Let Me In puts the emotional pressure in different places and stands firmly on its own legs. Like the Swedish movie it made me cry, but not at the same points. Let Me In is a dark and violent love story, a beautiful piece of cinema and a respectful rendering of my novel for which I am grateful. Again.

== Home media ==
Let Me In was released on DVD and Blu-ray in North America on February 1, 2011, and in the UK on March 14, 2011. The disc includes an audio commentary with director Reeves, a 17-minute featurette on the making of the film, a short that focuses on the art of the special effects, an in-depth video about the process of making the film's unique car crash scene, three deleted scenes, trailer and poster galleries, and a digital copy of the film. The Blu-ray contains an exclusive featurette titled "Dissecting Let Me In". Both the DVD and Blu-ray come with a copy of the limited-edition Let Me In: Crossroads comic book. As of April 2011, DVD sales (not including Blu-ray) totaled over 457,000 units sold with over $6.2 million in revenue.

== Other media ==
In April 2010, it was announced that Hammer Films and Dark Horse Comics were producing a four-issue comic book limited series based on the film. Marc Andreyko wrote the comic. The series, titled Let Me In: Crossroads, is a prequel to the film. The first issue has Abby and her "guardian" facing a ruthless real-estate tycoon who wants to steal their home and was released in December 2010. John Ajvide Lindqvist, who wrote the original novel that both the Swedish and American films are based upon, said "Nobody has asked me about [doing a comic] and I think that the project stinks. I am looking into this matter and hope that they have no right to do this." Later, he informed fans that he had in fact unwittingly sold the rights for the comic to be made, stating that the producers had misinformed him as to the nature of the contract he had signed.

== See also ==
- Vampire film
