= Let the Right One In (film) =

2008 Swedish romantic horror film

- Theatrical release poster
- Swedish: Låt den rätte komma in
- Directed by: Tomas Alfredson
- Screenplay by: John Ajvide Lindqvist
- Based on: Låt den rätte komma in by John Ajvide Lindqvist
- Produced by: Carl Molinder; John Nordling
- Starring: Kåre Hedebrant; Lina Leandersson; Per Ragnar; Ika Nord; Peter Carlberg
- Cinematography: Hoyte van Hoytema
- Edited by: Tomas Alfredson; Daniel Jonsäter
- Music by: Johan Söderqvist
- Production companies: EFTI; Sveriges Television; Filmpool Nord; Sandrew Metronome; WAG; Fido Film; The Chimney Pot; Ljudligan; Svenska Filminstitutet; Nordisk Film & TV Fond; Canal+
- Distributed by: Sandrew Metronome
- Release dates: 26 January 2008 (Gothenburg); 24 October 2008 (Sweden)
- Running time: 114 minutes
- Country: Sweden
- Language: Swedish
- Budget: 29 million kr; ($4.5 million)
- Box office: $11.2 million

Let the Right One In (Swedish: Låt den rätte komma in) is a 2008 Swedish romantic horror film directed by Tomas Alfredson and written by John Ajvide Lindqvist, who adapted his 2004 novel. The film tells the story of a bullied 12-year-old boy who develops a friendship with a strange child in Blackeberg, a suburb of Stockholm, in the early 1980s.

A film adaptation of Lindqvist's novel began development in 2004 when John Nordling acquired the rights to produce the project. Alfredson, unconcerned with the horror and vampire conventions, decided to tone down many elements of the novel and focus primarily on the relationship between the two main characters and explore the darker side of humanity. Selecting the lead actors involved a year-long process with open castings held all over Sweden. In the end, Kåre Hedebrant and Lina Leandersson were chosen for the leading roles. Leandersson's role in the film was dubbed by Elif Caylan. Principal photography took place in 2007 in Luleå, with additional filming in Blackeberg. The film was produced by EFTI, Sveriges Television and Filmpool Nord, with support from the Swedish Film Institute, Nordisk Film & TV Fond, WAG and Canal+.

Let the Right One In premiered at the Gothenburg Film Festival on 26 January 2008, where it received the Nordic Film Prize. It was released in Sweden on 24 October 2008 by Sandrew Metronome. The film received critical acclaim, with praise for the performances of the two leads, the cinematography, screenplay, and direction. It won several awards, including the Founders Award for Best Narrative Feature at the Tribeca Film Festival, as well as four Guldbagge Awards, including Best Director for Alfredson, Best Cinematography for Van Hoytema, and Best Screenplay for Lindqvist. It also won the Saturn Award for Best International Film and the Empire Award for Best Horror Film. At the 63rd British Academy Film Awards, the film was nominated for Best Film Not in the English Language. An American remake, titled Let Me In, was released in 2010.

== Plot ==
Oskar resides with his mother in the Swedish suburb of Blackeberg in 1982. His classmates bully him, and he spends his evenings imagining revenge. One evening, he meets Eli, who appears to be a girl his age. Eli has moved into the adjoining apartment with a man, Håkan. Eli informs Oskar they cannot be friends, but the two begin exchanging coded messages through their shared wall. Eli learns Oskar is being bullied by schoolmates and encourages him to stand up for himself. Oskar then enrolls in exercise classes after school.

Håkan kills a person on a footpath to harvest blood for Eli, but is interrupted by a passerby. Eli is prompted to waylay and kill a man, Jocke. A recluse witnesses the attack from his flat but doesn't report the incident. Håkan hides Jocke's body in a hole in the lake. Håkan makes another effort to obtain blood for Eli by trapping a boy in a room after school. When he is unsuccessful, Håkan pours acid onto his own face to avoid identification. Eli visits Håkan in the hospital, where he offers his own neck for feeding. Eli drains him of his blood, and Håkan falls out the window. Eli goes to Oskar's apartment and spends the night with him, during which they agree to "go steady", though Eli states, "I'm not a girl".

While on a field trip, the bullies again harass Oskar, who this time hits their leader in the head with a pole, injuring him. On that same trip, some of Oskar's classmates discover Jocke's body. Oskar suggests he and Eli should form a bond and cuts his hand. Eli laps up his blood then runs away. Jocke's friend Lacke has a fight with his girlfriend Virginia, and afterward Eli attacks her. She survives but discovers that exposure to sunlight burns her skin. While in the hospital, she asks an orderly to open the blinds in her room, and bursts into flames, committing suicide.

Eli comes to Oskar's apartment and asks to be invited in, but he refuses. Eli then steps inside and starts to bleed profusely, which causes Oskar to relent. Eli admits to being a vampire who must drink human blood to survive, also insisting they both are alike in that Oskar wants to kill and Eli needs to kill, and encourages him to "be me, for a little while." Later when Eli changes clothes, Oskar is shocked to see a horizontal scar across Eli's pubic area with no genitals.

Lacke sets out to kill Eli, whom he finds asleep in the apartment's bathtub. Oskar intervenes, and Eli wakes up and feeds on Lacke's blood. Afterward, Eli thanks Oskar and kisses him. Fearing they've attracted too much attention from the neighbors, Eli decides it isn't safe to stay and leaves that night. Oskar is lured out to resume the program at the pool. One of the bullies holds Oskar under the water. Eli arrives and rescues him by killing and dismembering the bullies, except for one, who is left sobbing on a bench.

Oskar is seen travelling on a train, with Eli in a box beside him. Eli taps the code for "kiss" (Note: Swedish: puss; specifically a small or brief kiss, usually with a closed mouth.) to Oskar, who responds the same.

== Cast ==
- Kåre Hedebrant as Oskar
- Lina Leandersson as Eli
  - Elif Ceylan as Eli (Voice)
  - Susanne Ruben as Aged Eli
- Per Ragnar as Håkan
- Henrik Dahl as Erik
- Karin Bergquist as Yvonne
- Peter Carlberg as Lacke
- Ika Nord as Virginia
- Mikael Rahm as Jocke
- Karl Robert Lindgren as Gösta
- Anders T. Peedu as Morgan
- Pale Olofsson as Larry
- Cayetano Ruiz as Magister Ávila
- Patrik Rydmark as Conny
- Johan Sömnes as Andreas
- Mikael Erhardsson as Martin
- Rasmus Luthander as Jimmy
- Sören Källstigen as Erik's friend
- Bernt Östman as Virginia's nurse
- Kajsa Linderholm as Oskar's teacher

== Production ==
=== Development ===
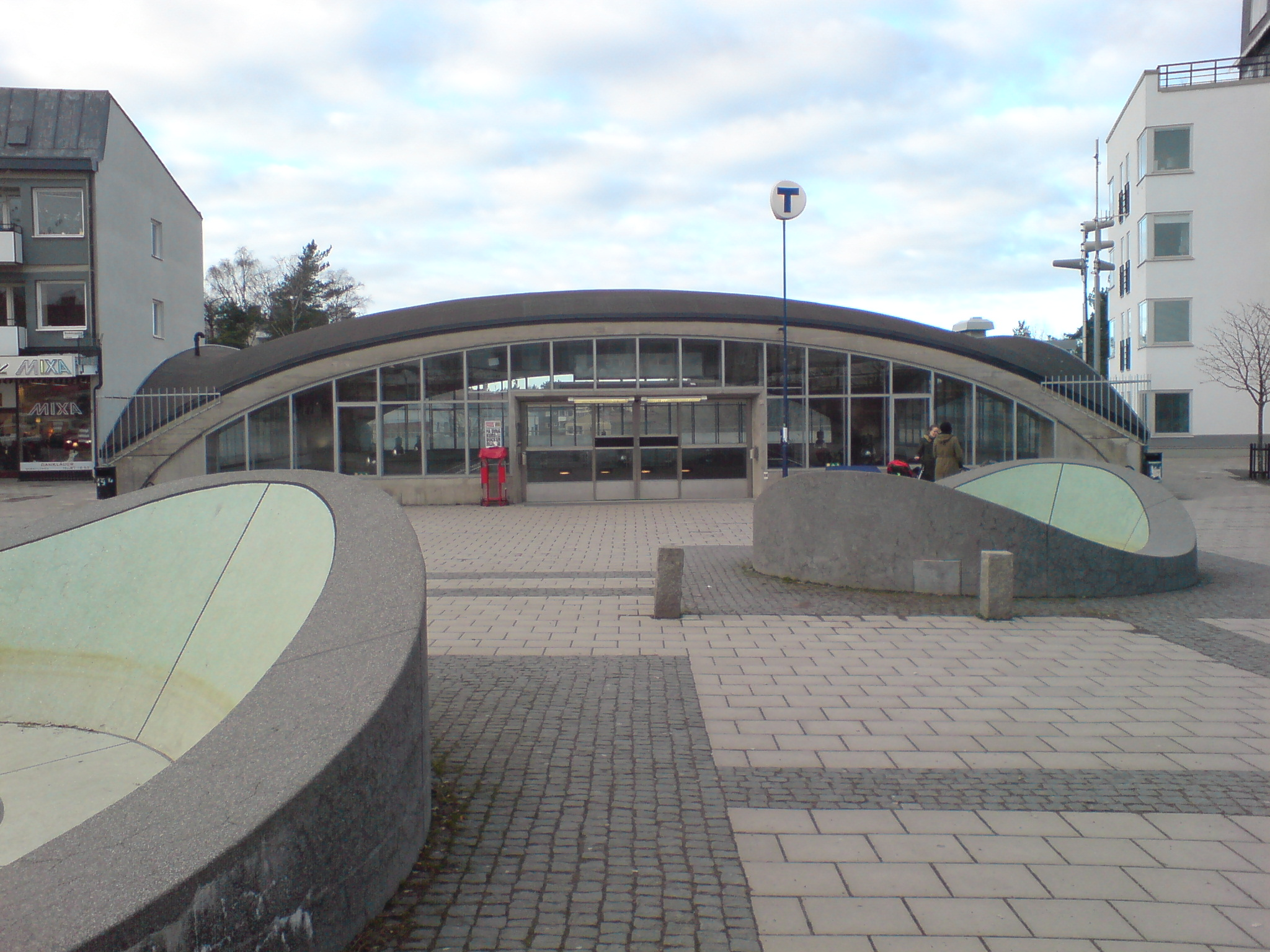
The characteristic subway station of Blackeberg, which features in the film

The film project started in late 2004 when John Nordling, a producer at the production company EFTI, contacted Ajvide Lindqvist's publisher Ordfront to acquire the rights for a film adaptation of his novel, Let the Right One In: "At Ordfront they just laughed when I called, I was like the 48th they put on the list. But I called John Ajvide Lindqvist and it turned out we had the same idea of what kind of film we should make. It wasn't about money, but about the right constellation". A friend introduced Tomas Alfredson to the novel. While he normally does not like to receive books, because "it's a private thing to choose what to read", he decided after a few weeks to read it. The depiction of bullying in the novel affected Alfredson deeply. "It's very hard and very down-to-earth, unsentimental (...) I had some period when I grew up when I had hard times in school (...) So it really shook me", he told the Los Angeles Times. Ajvide Lindqvist already knew Alfredson's previous work, and he and Alfredson discovered that they "understood each other very well".

In addition to EFTI, co-producers included Sveriges Television and the regional production-centre Filmpool Nord. The production involved a total budget of around 29 million SEK, including support from the Swedish Film Institute, Nordisk Film & TV Fond, WAG, and Canal+.

=== Screenplay ===
Lindqvist had insisted on writing the screenplay himself. Alfredson, who had no familiarity with the vampire and horror genres, initially expressed skepticism at having the original author do the adaptation, but found the result very satisfying. Many of the minor characters and events from the book were removed, and focus directed primarily on the love story between the two leads. In particular, many aspects of the character Håkan, including him being a paedophile, were toned down, and his relationship with Eli was mostly left open to interpretation. Alfredson felt that the film could not deal with such a serious theme as pedophilia in a satisfying manner, and that this element would detract from the story of the children and their relationship. Still, the film provided a few hints, of which Alfredson mentions one in the director's comments (Håkan likes children, for the wrong reasons).

A key passage in the novel details what happens when a vampire enters a room uninvited, an action that traditional vampire lore usually prohibits. Alfredson originally wanted to omit this from the film, but Ajvide Lindqvist was adamant that it had to be included. Alfredson was initially nervous about the scene. He realised in post-production that the sound effects and music made it "American, in a bad way", and had to be removed for the scene to work. The result, which shows Eli slowly beginning to bleed from her eyes, ears, and pores, received positive notices from many critics. Peter Bradshaw of The Guardian described it as a "haemophilia of rejection".

The novel presents Eli as an androgynous boy, castrated centuries before by a sadistic vampire nobleman. The film handles the issue of Eli's gender more ambiguously: a brief scene in which Eli changes into a dress offers a glimpse of a suggestive scar but no explicit elaboration. An actress plays Eli's character, but her voice was considered to be too high-pitched, so it was dubbed by voice actress Elif Ceylan. According to an interview with the director, as the film was originally conceived, flashbacks explained this aspect in more detail, but these scenes were eventually cut. Other explicit supernatural elements from the book—such as physical transformations and flight—were also omitted from the screenplay. In the end, Ajvide Lindqvist was satisfied with the adaptation. When Alfredson showed him eight minutes of footage for the first time, he "started to cry because it was so damn beautiful". He subsequently described the film as a "masterpiece". "It doesn't really matter that [Alfredson] didn't want to do it the way I wanted it in every respect. He could obviously never do that. The film is his creative process", he said.

=== Casting and filming ===
Casting of the lead actors took almost a year, with open castings held all over Sweden. Kåre Hedebrant, selected to audition for the role as Oskar after an initial screening at his school, eventually landed the role. Lina Leandersson responded to an online advertisement seeking a 12-year-old boy or girl "good at running". After three more auditions, she was selected to play Eli.

Alfredson has described the casting process as the most difficult part of making the film. He had particular concerns about the interaction between the two leads, and the fact that those who had read the book would have a preconceived notion of how the characters were supposed to look. He wanted the actors to look innocent, and be able to interact in front of the camera. They were supposed to be "mirror images of each other. She is everything he isn't. Dark, strong, brave, and a girl. (...) Like two sides of the same coin." On another occasion, Alfredson stated that "[c]asting is 70 percent of the job; it's not about picking the right people to make the roles. It is about creating chords, how a B and A minor interact together, and are played together." In the end, Alfredson expressed satisfaction with the result, and has frequently lauded Hedebrant and Leandersson for being "extremely intelligent", "incredibly wise", and "unprecedentedly fantastic."

The absence of ceilings made various overhead lighting techniques possible.

Although the film takes place in Blackeberg, a suburb of Stockholm, principal photography took place in Luleå (in the north of Sweden) to ensure enough snow and cold weather. The area where the filming took place dated from around the same time as Blackeberg, and has similar architecture. However, Alfredson shot a few scenes in the Blackeberg area. In particular, the scene where Eli leaps down on Virginia from a tree, was shot in the town square of Blackeberg. Another scene, where Eli attacks Jocke in an underpass, was shot in the nearby suburb of Råcksta. The original Blackeberg underpass that Lindqvist had envisioned was deemed too high to fit in the picture. Some of the outdoor close-up scenes were made in a super cold studio. The jungle gym where much of the interaction between Oskar and Eli takes place was constructed specifically for the film. Its design was intended to suit the CinemaScope format better than a regular jungle gym, which would typically have to be cropped height-wise.

Most of the filming used a single, fixed, Arri 535B camera, with almost no handheld usage, and few cuts. Tracking shots relied on a track-mounted dolly, rather than Steadicam, to create calm, predictable camera movement. The crew paid special attention to lighting. Cinematographer Hoyte van Hoytema and director Alfredson invented a technique they called "spray light". In an interview, van Hoytema describes it as follows: "If you could capture dull electrical light in a can and spray it like hairspray across Eli’s apartment, it would have the same result as what we created". For the emotional scenes between Oskar and Eli, van Hoytema consistently diffused the lighting.

=== Post-production ===
The film contains around fifty shots with computer-generated imagery. Alfredson wanted to make them very subtle and almost unnoticeable. The sequence where multiple cats attack Virginia, one of the most complicated scenes to film, required several weeks of drafting and planning. The crew used a combination of real cats, stuffed cats and computer-generated imagery.

The film features analogue sound-effects exclusively throughout. The lead sound-designer Per Sundström explained: "The key to good sound effects is working with natural and real sounds.(...) These analogue sounds can be digitally reworked as much as necessary, but the origin has to be natural". Sundström designed the soundscape to come as close to the actors as possible, with audible heartbeats, breathing, and swallowing. Late in production it was also decided to overdub actress Lina Leandersson's voice with a less feminine one, to underline the backstory. "She's 200 years old, not twelve. We needed that incongruity. Besides, it makes her menacing", Sundström said. Both men and women up to the age of forty auditioned for the role. After a vote, the film team ended up selecting Elif Ceylan, who provides all of Eli's spoken dialogue. Footage of Ceylan eating melon or sausage was combined with various animal noises to emulate the sound of Eli biting into her victims and drinking their blood. The sound crew won a Guldbagge Award for Best Achievement from the Swedish Film Institute, for the "nightmarishly great sound" in the film.

=== Soundtrack ===
Swedish composer Johan Söderqvist wrote the score which was performed by The Slovak National Symphony Orchestra. MovieScore Media issued the 21-track film soundtrack in a limited edition of 500 copies on 11 November 2008.

The song "Kvar i min bil", written and performed by Per Gessle, resonates repeatedly through the film. Originally an outtake from Gessle's solo album En händig man, the song was specially provided for the film, to resemble the sound of popular 1980s pop group Gyllene Tider. Gessle has described the song as a "bluesy tune with a nice guitar hook". Other songs in the film include "Försonade" from 1968, written and performed by future ABBA member Agnetha Fältskog, "Flash in the Night" from 1981, written by Tim Norell and Björn Håkansson and performed by Secret Service, and "Dags å välja sida" by Peps Blodsband.

== Release ==
Let the Right One In premiered at the Gothenburg Film Festival in Sweden on 26 January 2008 where Alfredson won the Festival's Nordic Film Prize. It subsequently played at several other film festivals, including the Tribeca Film Festival in New York City (24 April 2008), where it won the Founders Award for Best Narrative Feature; the Edinburgh Film Festival (25 June 2008), where it won the Rotten Tomatoes Critical Consensus Award; and the Neuchâtel International Fantastic Film Festival in Switzerland (3 July 2008), where it won the Méliès d'Argent (Silver Méliès).

The Swedish premiere was originally planned for 18 April 2008, but following the positive response from the festival screenings, the producers decided to postpone the release until autumn, to allow for a longer theatrical run. At one time there was a plan to release the film for a special series of screenings in Luleå, beginning 24 September and lasting seven days. This was canceled when the Swedish Film Institute announced that Everlasting Moments had been selected over Let the Right One In as Sweden's submission for the Academy Award for Best Foreign Language Film. The distributors released it on 24 October 2008 in Sweden, Norway, and as a limited release in the United States. In Australia, the film was released on 19 March 2009. The film was released in cinemas in the United Kingdom on 10 April 2009.

The film was released in North America on DVD and Blu-ray in March 2009 by Magnet Films, and in the United Kingdom in August by Momentum Pictures. The American discs feature both the original Swedish dialogue and an English dubbed version, while the European versions feature only the Swedish, and an audio-descriptive track in English. Icons of Fright reported that the American release had been criticised for using new, oversimplified English subtitles instead of the original theatrical subtitles. Following customer complaints, Magnet stated that they would release an updated version with the original theatrical subtitles, but will not exchange current discs. Director Alfredson also expressed his dissatisfaction with the DVD subtitles, calling it a "turkey translation". "If you look on the 'net, people are furious about how bad it is done", he added. The UK release retains the theatrical subtitles.

== Reception ==
=== Critical reception ===
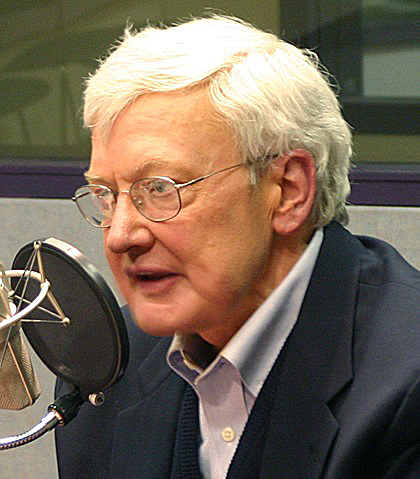
Roger Ebert called the film "The best modern vampire movie".

Let the Right One In has a 98% rating at Rotten Tomatoes based on 192 reviews, with an average rating of 8.3/10. The critical consensus reads, "Let the Right One In reinvigorates the seemingly tired vampire genre by effectively mixing scares with intelligent storytelling". Additionally, Metacritic has reported an average score of 82 out of 100 based on 30 reviews, indicating "universal acclaim".

Swedish critics generally expressed positive reactions to the film. In 26 reviews listed at the Swedish-language review site Kritiker.se it achieved an average rating of 4.1 out of 5. Svenska Dagbladet gave the film a rating of five out of six, and hailed Alfredson for his ability to "tell [stories] through pictures instead of words about a society where hearts are turned to icicles and everyone is left on their own, but also about love warm and red like blood on white melting snow". Göran Everdahl for SVT's Gomorron Sverige gave the film four out of five and described the film as "kitchen sink fantasy" that "gives the vampire story back something it has been missing for a long time: the ability to really frighten us". Expressen and Göteborgs-Posten were less impressed and gave the film three out of five. Expressen criticised it for being unappealing to those uninitiated in vampire films while Göteborgs-Posten believed the supporting characters had lost the emotional depth that made the novel so successful.

Reviewers have commented on the beautiful cinematography and its quiet, restrained approach to the sometimes bloody and violent subject matter. KJ Doughton of Film Threat thought the visuals in the ending were fresh and inventive and would be talked about for years to come. Roger Ebert gave the film three-and-a-half out of four, calling it a vampire movie that takes vampires seriously, drawing comparisons to Nosferatu and to Nosferatu the Vampyre. He described it as a story of "two lonely and desperate kids capable of performing dark deeds without apparent emotion", and praised the actors for "powerful" performances in "draining" roles. Ebert later called the film "The best modern vampire movie". One negative review came from Owen Gleiberman of Entertainment Weekly, who gave the movie a "C", characterizing it as a "Swedish head-scratcher", with "a few creepy images but very little holding them together".

Bloody Disgusting ranked the film first in their list of the 'Top 20 Horror Films of the Decade', with the article saying "It’s rare enough for a horror film to be good; even rarer are those that function as genuine works of art. Let the Right One In is one of those films – an austerely beautiful creation that reveals itself slowly, like the best works of art do." The film was ranked #15 in Empire's 2010 list of "The 100 Best Films Of World Cinema". In their rationale, the authors noted that, "in these days where every second movie seems to feature vampires, it takes a very special twist on the legend to surprise us – but this one knocked us out and then bit us in the jugular", and found that the "strange central friendship" between the two lead characters was what made the film "so frightening, and so magnetic". In the early 2010s, Time Out conducted a poll with several authors, directors, actors and critics who have worked within the horror genre to vote for their top horror films; Let the Right One In placed at number 28 on their top 100 list. The film was later voted the 94th greatest film since 2000 in an international critics' poll conducted by BBC. In 2025, it ranked number 70 on The New York Times' list of "The 100 Best Movies of the 21st Century" and was one of the films voted for the "Readers' Choice" edition of the list, finishing at number 231. It also ranked number 3 on The Hollywood Reporter's list of the "25 Best Horror Movies of the 21st Century."

=== Awards and nominations ===
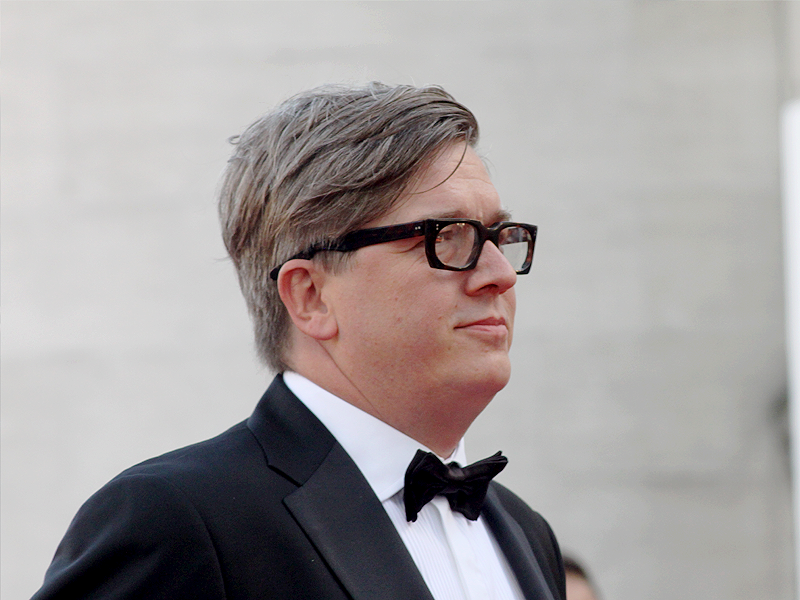
Alfredson received many awards and nominations for his work on the film.

Alfredson won the Gothenburg Film Festival's Nordic Film Prize as director of Let the Right One In on the grounds that he "succeeds to transform a vampire movie to a truly original, touching, amusing and heart-warming story about friendship and marginalisation". Let the Right One In was nominated in five categories for the Swedish Film Institute's 2008 Guldbagge Award, eventually winning for best directing, screenplay and cinematography as well as a Best Achievement-award to production designer Eva Norén. In awarding the film the "Founders Award for Best Narrative Feature", the top award at the Tribeca Film Festival, the jury described the film as a "mesmerizing exploration of loneliness and alienation through masterful reexamination of the vampire myth". The film also won the Méliès d'Argent (Silver Méliès) at the Swiss Neuchâtel International Fantastic Film Festival (NIFFF) and went on to win the Méliès d'Or (Golden Méliès) for the "Best European Fantastic Feature Film", awarded by the European Fantastic Film Festivals Federation of which NIFFF is a part. Other awards include the first Rotten Tomatoes Critical Consensus Award at the Edinburgh Film Festival.

Despite being an internationally successful film, Let the Right One In was not submitted by Sweden for the Academy Award for Best Foreign Language Film. The details surrounding the film's eligibility for the award resulted in some confusion. Being released on 24 October 2008, the film would normally be eligible for submission for the 82nd Academy Awards. However, the producers decided to release it on 24 September as a seven-day limited run only in Luleå. This would be exactly enough to meet the criteria for the 81st Academy Awards instead. When the Swedish Film Institute on 16 September announced that Jan Troell's Everlasting Moments had been selected instead of Let the Right One In, the Luleå screenings were canceled. Despite the fact that the film was released within the eligibility period for the 82nd Academy Awards, it wasn't among the films considered because the Swedish Film Institute doesn't allow a film to be considered twice.

Award	Date of ceremony	Category	Recipient(s)	Result	Ref.
Amsterdam Fantastic Film Festival	25 April 2009	Silver Scream Award	Tomas Alfredson	Won	
Amsterdam Fantastic Film Festival	25 April 2009	Black Tulip Award	Tomas Alfredson	Won	
Austin Fantastic Fest	2009	Best Horror Feature		Won	
Austin Film Critics Association	16 December 2008	Best Foreign Language Film		Won	
Australian Film Critics Association	2009	Best Foreign Language Film		Won	
Boston Society of Film Critics Awards	14 December 2008	Foreign Language Film		Won	
British Academy Film Awards	21 February 2010	Best Film Not in the English Language		Nominated	
British Independent Film Awards	6 December 2009	Best Foreign Film		Won	
Broadcast Film Critics Association Awards	8 January 2009	Best Foreign Language Film		Nominated	
Calgary International Film Festival	2008	Best International Feature	Tomas Alfredson	Won	
Chicago Film Critics Association Awards	18 December 2008	Most Promising Filmmaker	Tomas Alfredson	Won	
Chicago Film Critics Association Awards	18 December 2008	Most Promising Performer	Lina Leandersson	Nominated	
Edinburgh International Film Festival	2008	Rotten Tomatoes Critical Consensus Award	Tomas Alfredson	Won	
Empire Awards	28 March 2010	Best Horror Film		Won	
Fantasia Film Festival	2008	Best European/North — South American Film	Tomas Alfredson	Won	
Fantasia Film Festival	2008	Best Director	Tomas Alfredson	Won	
Fantasia Film Festival	2008	Best Film	Tomas Alfredson	Won	
Fantasia Film Festival	2008	Best Photography	Hoyte Van Hoytema	Won	
Florida Film Critics Circle Awards	18 March 2008	Best Foreign Language Film		Won	
Göteborg Film Festival	2008	Nordic Film Prize		Won	
Göteborg Film Festival	2008	Nordic Vision Award	Hoyte Van Hoytema	Won	
Goya Awards	24 February 2010	Best European Film		Nominated	
Guldbagge Awards	12 January 2009	Best Achievement (Bästa prestation)	Eva Norén	Won	
Guldbagge Awards	12 January 2009	Best Achievement (Bästa prestation)	Per Sundström, Jonas Jansson, Patrik Strömdahl	Won	
Guldbagge Awards	12 January 2009	Best Cinematography (Bästa foto)	Hoyte Van Hoytema	Won	
Guldbagge Awards	12 January 2009	Best Direction (Bästa regi)	Tomas Alfredson	Won	
Guldbagge Awards	12 January 2009	Best Screenplay (Bästa manuskript)	John Ajvide Lindqvist	Won	
Guldbagge Awards	12 January 2009	Best Film (Bästa film)	John Nordling, Carl Molinder	Nominated	
Guldbagge Awards	12 January 2009	Best Supporting Actor (Bästa manliga biroll)	Per Ragnar	Nominated	
Houston Film Critics Society Awards	17 December 2008	Best Foreign Language Film		Nominated	
Irish Film and Television Awards	20 February 2010	International Film		Nominated	
London Film Critics' Circle Awards	18 February 2010	Foreign Language Film of the Year	Tomas Alfredson	Won	
Méliès International Festivals Federation	9 October 2008	Méliès d'Or		Won	
NatFilm Festival	2008	Critics Award	Tomas Alfredson	Won	
Online Film Critics Society Awards	19 January 2009	Best Foreign Language Film		Won	
Online Film Critics Society Awards	19 January 2009	Best Adapted Screenplay	John Ajvide Lindqvist	Won	
Online Film Critics Society Awards	19 January 2009	Breakthrough Filmmaker	Tomas Alfredson	Won	
Online Film Critics Society Awards	19 January 2009	Breakthrough Performance	Lina Leandersson	Won	
Online Film Critics Society Awards	19 January 2009	Breakthrough Performance	Kåre Hedebrant	Nominated	
Puchon International Fantastic Film Festival	2009	Best Director	Tomas Alfredson	Won	
Puchon International Fantastic Film Festival	2009	Citizen's Choice Award	Tomas Alfredson	Won	
San Diego Film Critics Society Awards	15 December 2008	Best Foreign Language Film		Won	
San Francisco Film Critics Circle	15 December 2008	Best Foreign Language Film		Won	
Satellite Awards	14 December 2008	Best Foreign Language Film		Nominated	
Saturn Awards	25 June 2009	Best International Film		Won	
Saturn Awards	25 June 2009	Best Performance by a Younger Actor	Lina Leandersson	Nominated	
Saturn Awards	25 June 2009	Best Writing	John Ajvide Lindqvist	Nominated	
Sitges Film Festival	2008	Grand Prize of European Fantasy Film in Gold	Tomas Alfredson	Won	
Toronto After Dark Film Festival	2008	Best Feature Film	Tomas Alfredson	Won	
Toronto Film Critics Association Awards	17 December 2008	Best Foreign Language Film		Won	
Tribeca Film Festival	2008	Best Narrative Feature	Tomas Alfredson	Won	
Washington DC Area Film Critics Association Awards	8 December 2008	Best Foreign Language Film		Won	
Woodstock Film Festival	2008	Best Narrative Feature	Tomas Alfredson	Won	

== American version ==
After the release of Let the Right One In took place, Matt Reeves signed on to write and direct an English-language version for Overture Films and Hammer Films. Hammer acquired the rights at the 2008 Tribeca Film Festival, where Let the Right One In won the "Founders Award for Best Narrative Feature", and Overture films planned to release the film in 2010. Alfredson has expressed unhappiness about the idea of a remake, saying that "remakes should be made of movies that aren't very good, that gives you the chance to fix whatever has gone wrong" and expressing concern that the result would be too mainstream. Alfredson was initially asked to helm the remake, but he turned it down stating that "I am too old to make the same film twice and I have other stories that I want to tell." Lindqvist, in contrast, said that he had heard that Reeves "will make a new film based on the book, and not remake the Swedish film" and so "it'll be something completely different, but it's going to be really interesting to see." Hammer Films producer Simon Oakes initially referred to the project as a remake of the film, but later just as "Reeves' version". Let Me In was released in late 2010 starring Chloë Grace Moretz and Kodi Smit-McPhee as Abby and Owen, Eli's and Oskar's respective counterparts, and received very positive reviews but underperformed at the box office.

== See also ==
- Vampire film
