= Let the Old Dreams Die =

Collection of short stories by John Ajvide Lindqvist

- Swedish book cover for Låt de gamla drömmarna dö
- Author: John Ajvide Lindqvist
- Original title: Pappersväggar (Paper Walls); Låt de gamla drömmarna dö
- Language: Swedish
- Genre: Horror
- Publisher: Quercus Publishing
- Publication place: Sweden

Let the Old Dreams Die is a short story collection by Swedish writer John Ajvide Lindqvist. The bulk of the stories were originally published in Sweden in 2005 under the title Pappersväggar (Paper Walls). Quercus published the first English-language release in 2011, with the addition of the title story "Let the Old Dreams Die".

The title story is a sequel to Lindqvist's 2004 vampire novel Let the Right One In. Also included is "The Final Processing", a sequel to Lindqvist's horror novel Handling the Undead. In 2018 the story "Border" was adapted into a feature film.

== Contents ==
- "Border"
- "A Village in the Sky"
- "Equinox"
- "Itsy Bitsy"
- "The Substitute"
- "Eternal/Love"
- "To Put My Arms Around You, to Music"
- "Majken"
- "Paper Walls"
- "Final Processing"
- "Tindalos" (included only in the US edition)
- "Let the Old Dreams Die" (included in the UK and US editions, published separately in Sweden)

== Reception ==
Terrence Rafferty of The New York Times wrote:

It's a good thing Lindqvist is such a lively, observant writer because, despite the relative paucity of evil, the themes of his fiction can be mighty grim: his characters spend an inordinate amount of time negotiating with the Reaper, in his various forms. Maybe it's a Swedish thing. But his touch is a good deal lighter than that of his great, gloomy compatriot Ingmar Bergman. A Seventh Seal by Lindqvist would have plenty of jokes and perhaps even a sliver of hope. He tends to write about people who don't take themselves, or life, too seriously – until they're forced to, by love or fear or (most often) both.
