= Mikael Rahm =

Swedish actor

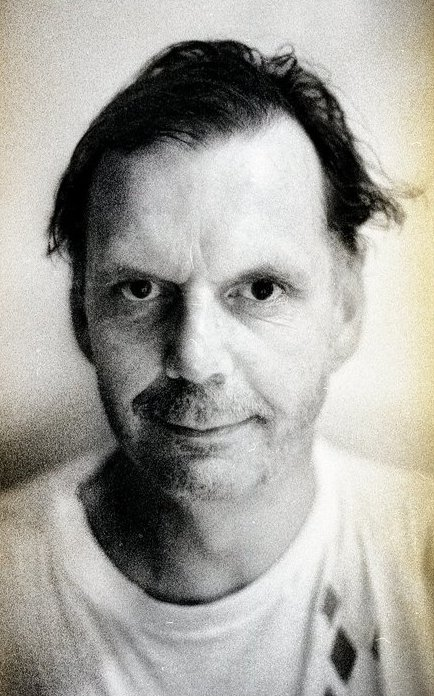
Mikael Rahm

Mikael Rahm (born 15 May 1957 in Östersund) is a Swedish actor. Internationally, he is best known for his parts in the movies As It Is in Heaven and Let the Right One In.

== Filmography ==
Year	Title	Role	Notes
2001	Jordgubbar med riktig mjölk	Bonde	
2004	As It Is in Heaven	Holmfrid	
2008	Let the Right One In	Jocke	
2009	The Girl with the Dragon Tattoo	Editor	
2015	Miraklet i Viskan	Torsten Wiman	
2015	Så ock på jorden	Holmfrid	
