= Ika Nord =

Swedish actress and mime

- Born: Ulrika Christina Elisabeth Nord; 29 April 1960; Halmstad, Halland, Sweden
- Other name: Ulrika Nord
- Occupation: actress
- Notable work: Ika i rutan (Ika); Ikas TV-kalas (Ika); Tomtemaskinen (Findus); Let the Right One In (Virginia); Lasse-Majas detektivbyrå – Skuggor över Valleby (Pålette Hasselbacken)
- Spouse(s): Lars Demian (divorced); David Tallroth (2013–)

Ulrika Christina Elisabeth Nord, stage name Ika Nord (born 29 April 1960 in Halmstad) is a Swedish actress and mime.

In Sweden, she is best known for her work in children's television shows, such as Ika i rutan and Ikas TV-kalas. Internationally, Nord is best known for her role (Virginia) in Let the Right One In (2008).

Nord works as an actress, mime, clown and director.

Nord studied classic ballet in Halmstad from the age of six to seventeen. Some years later, she studied in Paris at Conservatoire National de l'Art du Mime, then at Matt Mattox Jazz Art Dance School, École de Mime Étienne Decroux and L'Atelier de Théâtre Robert Cordier.
