= Let the Right One In (novel) =

Swedish novel by John Ajvide Lindqvist

- Swedish book cover
- Author: John Ajvide Lindqvist
- Original title: (Swedish: Låt den rätte komma in)
- Translator: Ebba Segerberg
- Language: Swedish
- Genre: Gothic, horror
- Publisher: St. Martin's Griffin
- Publication date: 2004
- Publication place: Sweden
- English publication date: 2007
- Pages: 480
- ISBN: 0-312-35529-7

Let the Right One In (Swedish: Låt den rätte komma in) is a 2004 vampire novel by Swedish writer John Ajvide Lindqvist. The story centers on the relationship between a 12-year-old boy, Oskar, and a centuries-old vampire child, Eli. It takes place in Blackeberg, a working-class suburb of Stockholm, in the early 1980s. The book grapples with the darker side of humanity, including such issues as existential anxiety, social isolation, fatherlessness, divorce, alcoholism, school bullying, paedophilia, genital mutilation, self-mutilation, and murder.

The book was a bestseller in the author's home country of Sweden; it was translated into several languages, including English.

It has been adapted as three independent films, a play, and a television series. A Swedish-language film, Let the Right One In, directed by Tomas Alfredson, was released in 2008. Another adaptation was created in English and based on Lindqvist's screenplay. Entitled Let Me In, it was directed by Matt Reeves and released in 2010. An English-language stage adaptation premiered in 2013.

The 2021 Irish horror comedy film Let the Wrong One In is loosely based on Lindqvist's novel.

American network TNT ordered a pilot episode for a television series based on the novel, to premiere in 2017. TNT ultimately passed on the series. In 2021, Showtime gave the Let the Right One In series a 10-episode order, to be produced by Tomorrow Studios and starring Demián Bichir. The series premiered on October 9, 2022.

== Synopsis ==
Oskar is a bullied boy who is on the verge of his 13th birthday. He lives with his mother, who is loving and with whom he seems to have a connection. His father is an alcoholic living in the countryside. Oskar has gained interests in crime and forensics. He keeps a scrapbook filled with articles about murders and often fantasizes about killing his tormentors. He even goes as far as taking out his aggression on a tree in the woods near his apartment.

Oskar befriends someone named Eli, who appears to be a girl his age. Eli, who lives with a man named Håkan, is revealed to be an immortal vampire who was turned as a child and is stuck forever in a child's body and mind. Oskar and Eli develop a relationship, and Eli helps him fight back against his tormentors. Their relationship becomes closer, and they reveal more of themselves, including fragments of Eli's life. Among the details revealed is that Eli was born a boy named Elias, who was castrated by a pedophilic vampire-nobleman over 200 years ago. The androgynous Elias now presents as Eli dressing in feminine clothing, thus perceived by townspeople as a girl.

Following this revelation, the novel switches the pronouns referring to Eli from "she" to "he". When Eli confides, "I'm not a girl," Oskar responds by simply asking if they want to date. Suspecting Eli might be a boy, Oskar later asks one of his female teachers, Marie-Louise, whether two boys can fall in love and commit to one another. Since he had recently developed romantic feelings for Eli, he tries to understand if same-sex romance is acceptable. He also asks her whether it is possible for someone to be both a boy and a girl at the same time.

Håkan serves Eli by procuring blood from the living. He struggles with his conscience and chooses victims whom he can trap, but who are not too young. Eli pays him for doing this. Håkan offers to go out one last time if he can spend a night with Eli after he gets the blood. Håkan is only allowed to touch Eli.

Håkan's attempt to get blood fails, and he is caught. He disfigures himself with acid so that the police will not be able to trace Eli through him. Eli visits Håkan, who offers his blood. Eli drinks, but a guard interrupts them and Eli fails to kill him. Håkan throws himself out the window to the ground below, but is reanimated as a vampire driven by his desire for Eli. Håkan pursues and tries to rape Eli. Eli fights him off and escapes. Håkan is destroyed by a friend of Oskar's named Tommy after Håkan and Tommy are locked in a basement together.

The local alcoholic, Lacke, suspects a child is responsible for the murder of his friend. Lacke sees Eli attack his girlfriend, Virginia. Eli tries to drink Virginia's blood, but Lacke fights Eli off. Virginia survives, but starts turning into a vampire. She does not realize that she is "infected" until she tries to prolong her life by drinking her own blood, and finds that exposure to the sun causes boils on her skin. Virginia recognizes her transformation and kills herself in bed by exposing herself to daylight. Lacke is thwarted by Oskar and Eli.

Oskar fights back against his tormentor, Jonny, whom he injures. Jonny and his older brother corner Oskar at night at the pool and try to drown him. Eli rescues Oskar and beheads the two brothers. Eli and Oskar flee the city with Eli's money and possessions.

== Characters ==
- Oskar Eriksson — the protagonist, a bullied twelve-year-old boy
- Eli — an immortal vampire who resembles a twelve-year-old; born an androgynous boy named Elias and castrated over 200 years ago
- Håkan Bengtsson — a forty-five-year-old man, pedophile and former high school teacher, who now procures human blood for Eli
- Tommy — a rebellious sixteen-year-old boy, neighbor and friend of Oskar
- Jonny Forsberg, Micke Siskov and Tomas Ahlstedt — boys in Oskar's class who bully and beat him often
- Lacke — the local alcoholic
- Jocke Bengtsson — one of Lacke's friends who is killed by Eli
- Virginia — a divorced woman who has a difficult relationship with Lacke
- Yvonne — Tommy's mother
- Staffan — a policeman and Yvonne's new boyfriend
- Jimmy — Jonny's older, sadistic brother
- Morgan, Larry and Gösta — Lacke's friends

== Title ==
The title refers to the Morrissey song "Let the Right One Slip In". It is a play on the concept in vampire folklore which says that vampires cannot enter a house unless invited. The American version is called Let Me In because the publishers believed that the original title was too long. They first suggested the title be changed to Let Her In, but Lindqvist suggested Let Me In instead, given that 'Her' was inaccurate. It is the vampire who must be careful to let the right person in on her secret. A paperback with the original title was later released to promote the film.

== Bibliography (English translations) ==
- UK Edition: London: Quercus: 2007. ISBN 1-84724-169-7
- US Edition: Let The Right One In: New York: Thomas Dunne Books: 2007. ISBN 0-312-35528-9
- Australian Edition: Melbourne: Text: 2007. ISBN 978-1-921145-71-1

== Epilogue ==
Lindqvist wrote a short story titled Låt de gamla drömmarna dö ("Let the Old Dreams Die"), exploring what happened to Oskar and Eli after they left on the train.

The story is told from the perspective of a friend of a couple consisting of Karin, a police officer who oversaw the investigation of the killings at the pool, and Stefan, the last person to see Oskar and Eli alive. Stefan saw Oskar and Eli after they had disembarked from the train on which they were riding in the epilogue. They were sitting on a trunk holding hands which they had cut to engage in the pact which Oskar had described to Eli previously, suggesting Oskar was intent on becoming a vampire along with Eli. The story concludes with new evidence that Oskar and Eli were recently in Barcelona, Spain.

== Film adaptations ==
=== Let the Right One in (2008) ===
In 2008, a Swedish film adaptation of Let the Right One In was released, directed by Tomas Alfredson and starring Lina Leandersson as Eli and Kåre Hedebrant as Oskar. The film received critical acclaim and was voted the 94th greatest film since 2000 in an international critics' poll conducted by BBC.

=== Let Me In (2010) ===
An English language film based mainly on the Swedish film's screenplay was released in October 2010. The film's setting was changed from Blackeberg to Los Alamos, New Mexico, and the main characters' names were changed to Owen and Abby. Directed by Cloverfield director Matt Reeves and starring Chloë Grace Moretz as Abby and Kodi Smit-McPhee as Owen, it received positive reviews despite not performing well at the box office.

== Television series ==
In March 2015, A&E Studios confirmed the television series adaption of the novel, written by Jeff Davis and Brandon Boyce. It never aired.

In August 2016, TNT ordered a pilot. The cast included Kristine Froseth as Eli, Thomas Kretschmann and Benjamin Wadsworth. TNT decided not to produce the series, and it was shopped around.

In March 2021, Showtime ordered a pilot, to be produced by Tomorrow Studios. The cast included Demián Bichir, Anika Noni Rose, Grace Gummer, Madison Taylor Baez, Kevin Carroll, Jacob Buster, and Ian Foreman. In September 2021, it was announced that Showtime had given the production a series order for a first season consisting of 10 episodes. In February 2022, Željko Ivanek and Fernanda Andrade joined the cast in recurring roles. The series premiered on October 9, 2022.

In an October 2022 interview John Ajvide Lindqvist mentioned he had nothing to do with the TV show and lamented inadvertently selling all rights to the book for only 1 SEK when he thought he was only giving Hammer Films the rights to make the movie (Let Me In), meaning he will earn no royalties from the TV show. According to Lindqvist, Hammer had misled him of the nature of the contract; “There were thick bundles of American legal prose. And that would then mean that I sold all the rights for a penny, but that was just a mere formality and would have no practical meaning, they said.” In January 2023, the series was cancelled after one season.

== Stage adaptations ==
=== Lindqvist ===
An adaptation directed by Jakob Hultcrantz Hansson with a script by John Ajvide Lindqvist premiered March 16, 2011, on Uppsala Stadsteater, Uppsala. It premiered at Nord-Trøndelag Teater in Steinkjer, Norway, on November 15, 2012.

=== Thorne ===
A new stage adaptation produced by Marla Rubin and the National Theatre of Scotland written by Jack Thorne directed by John Tiffany, assisted by Justin Martin, premiered at Dundee Rep Theatre in June 2013 and transferred to the Royal Court Theatre for November and December 2013. The show transferred to the Apollo Theatre in March 2014, having received positive reviews from a number of national media outlets. The production toured to New York with a run at St. Ann's Warehouse in 2015.

Thorne's play premiered at Rogaland Teater in Stavanger, Norway on January 24, 2015, in a new production as La den rette komme inn.

In October to November 2022, a production directed by Alexander Berlage was performed by Darlinghurst Theatre in Sydney, Australia, presented by arrangement with Marla Rubin Productions. Will McDonald played Oskar, while Ell was played by Sebrina Thornton-Walker.

== Comic book series ==
In April 2010, Hammer Film Productions and Dark Horse Comics announced a four-issue comic book limited series with Marc Andreyko as the author. The series, titled Let Me In: Crossroads, is a prequel to the American film. The first issue has Abby and her "guardian" facing a ruthless real-estate tycoon who wants to steal their home and was released in December 2010.

Original author John Ajvide Lindqvist said, "Nobody has asked me about [doing a comic] and I think that the project stinks. I am looking into this matter and hope that they have no right to do this." Later, he told fans that he learned he had unwittingly sold the rights for the comic to be made. He said that the producers had misled him about the contract he had signed for the adaptation of his work.
