= Overture Films =

Defunct American film production company

Overture Films, LLC
- Type: Subsidiary
- Industry: Motion pictures
- Founded: November 2006; 19 years ago
- Founders: Chris McGurk; Danny Rosett
- Defunct: July 24, 2010; 16 years ago
- Fate: Closed; Marketing and distribution assets sold to Relativity Media
- Successor: Relativity Media; Lionsgate
- Headquarters: Beverly Hills, California, United States
- Products: Films
- Parent: Starz

Overture Films was an American independent film production and distribution company and a subsidiary of Starz (then subsidiary of Liberty Media). It was founded in November 2006 by Chris McGurk and Danny Rosett. Through its affiliated companies Anchor Bay Entertainment, Starz Entertainment Pay Channels, Starz Media, and Starz Play, Overture Films had made its films available worldwide to viewers across multiple platforms via their home video, premium television, and Internet distribution channels.

Although the studio had some minor critical and/or commercial successes with films like The Visitor, Sunshine Cleaning, Last Chance Harvey, Law Abiding Citizen, The Men Who Stare At Goats, The Crazies, and Let Me In, most of the company's films flopped, or those that did not, merely broke even. Starz was forced to close the company in 2010 with it being handled by Anchor Bay Entertainment (Now Lionsgate), even though rumors had circulated earlier that year that it would be sold off. Its marketing and distribution assets are now handled by Relativity Media.

== Released movies ==
Title	Release date
Mad Money	January 18, 2008
Sleepwalking	March 14, 2008
The Visitor	April 18, 2008
Henry Poole Is Here	August 15, 2008
Traitor	August 27, 2008
Righteous Kill	September 12, 2008
Nothing Like the Holidays	December 12, 2008
Last Chance Harvey	January 16, 2009
Sunshine Cleaning	March 27, 2009
Paper Heart	August 7, 2009
Pandorum	September 25, 2009
Capitalism: A Love Story	October 2, 2009
Law Abiding Citizen	October 16, 2009
The Men Who Stare at Goats	November 6, 2009
The Crazies	February 26, 2010
Brooklyn's Finest	March 5, 2010
Jack Goes Boating	September 17, 2010
Let Me In	October 1, 2010
Stone	October 8, 2010
