= Blackeberg =

Suburb of Stockholm, Sweden

Coordinates: 59°20′52″N 17°53′01″E

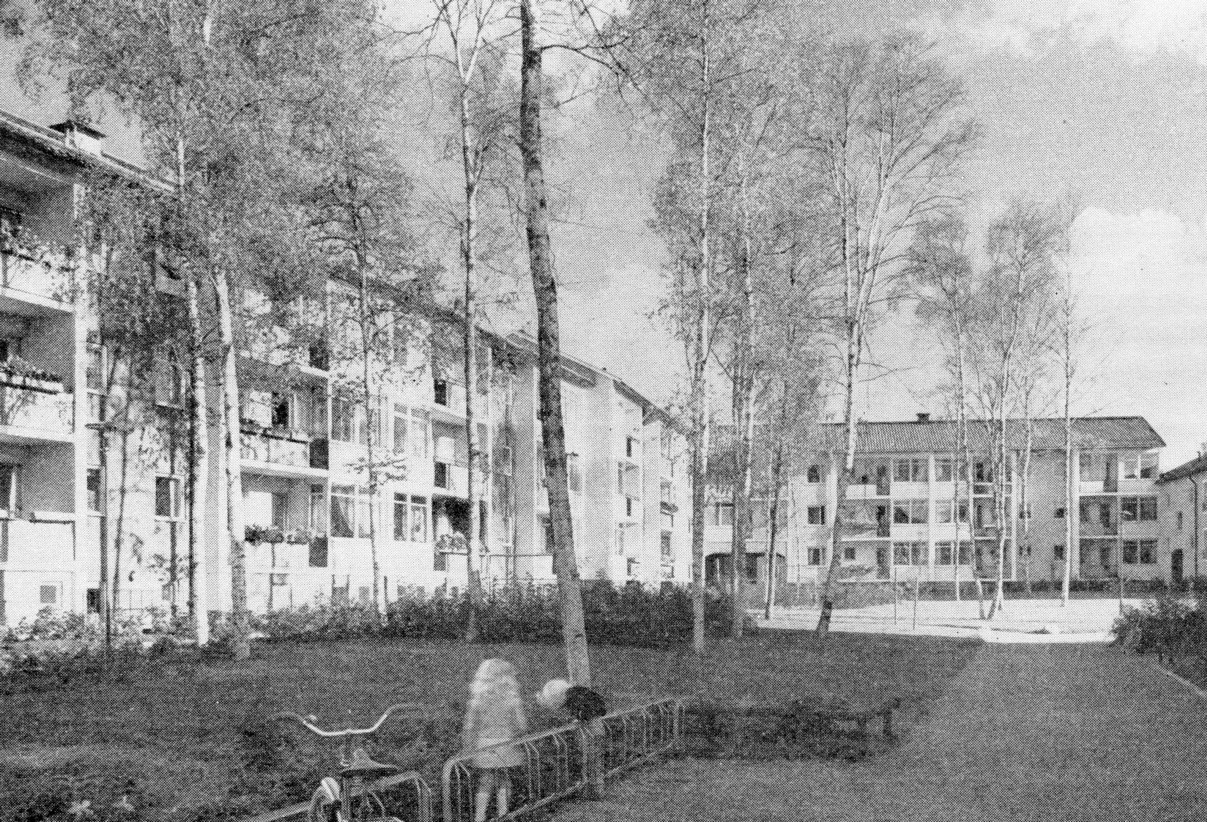
Blackeberg in the 1950s

Blackeberg is a suburb of Stockholm built in the 1950s, and is part of the Bromma borough. Blackeberg was originally a croft first mentioned in 1599. The croft was demolished in 1861 by Knut Ljunglöf, who built a house, a stable, a mill and a saw instead. The saw and mill are now both cultural relics and are still standing in Kvarnviken for tourists to see. The city of Stockholm bought Blackeberg in the late 1940s. Three-story apartment blocks and a centre with a cinema and a library were built in the 1950s. Many people moved from the central parts of Stockholm to Blackeberg and neighbouring suburbs. Blackeberg has a metro station. It was designed by Peter Celsing and opened in 1952.

== Demographics ==
As of 2023, Blackeberg had 8,993 inhabitants, 33.5% of whom had a foreign background (either born outside of Sweden, or born in Sweden to two parents who were themselves born outside of Sweden). In Stockholm as a whole the rate is 34.9%.

== In popular culture ==
The critically acclaimed vampire novel Let the Right One In, as well as its movie adaptation, are set in Blackeberg.
