= Handling the Undead =

Book by John Ajvide Lindqvist

- Handling the Undead cover
- Author: John Ajvide Lindqvist
- Original title: (Swedish: Hanteringen av odöda)
- Translator: Ebba Segerberg
- Language: Swedish
- Genre: Gothic, Horror
- Publisher: St. Martin's Griffin
- Publication place: Sweden
- English publication date: 2009-03-05
- Pages: 384
- ISBN: 978-1-84724-413-0

Handling the Undead (Swedish: Hanteringen av odöda) is a 2005 horror novel by Swedish writer John Ajvide Lindqvist, translated into English in 2009. The book revolves around the unexplained reanimation of thousands of recently deceased people in Stockholm.

The plot focuses on the reactions of society and the many conflicts that arise between Swedish authorities and the relatives of the undead; the horror is less in the uncanny animation of corpses but in the realities of grief, loss and our own inevitable mortality. An important theme is the bond between parents and children.

== Film adaptation ==
A Swedish film adaptation was reportedly in development since 2005, based on a screenplay by Lindqvist and to be directed by Kristian Petri. In 2022, a Norwegian-Swedish adaptation, directed by Thea Hvistendahl in her feature directorial debut, was announced. In September 2022, it was announced that the film stars Renate Reinsve and Anders Danielsen Lie and that Neon had acquired the North American and UK distribution rights. The production was underway by August 2022. Lindqvist and Hvistendahl co-wrote the screenplay.

Handling the Undead was released in Norway on February 9, 2024.

== Bibliography (English translations) ==
- John Ajvide Lindqvist: Handling the Undead: London: Quercus: 2009: ISBN 1-84724-413-0
- Australian Edition: Melbourne: Text: 2009: ISBN 1-921351-80-2
