= John Ajvide Lindqvist =

Swedish writer (born 1968)

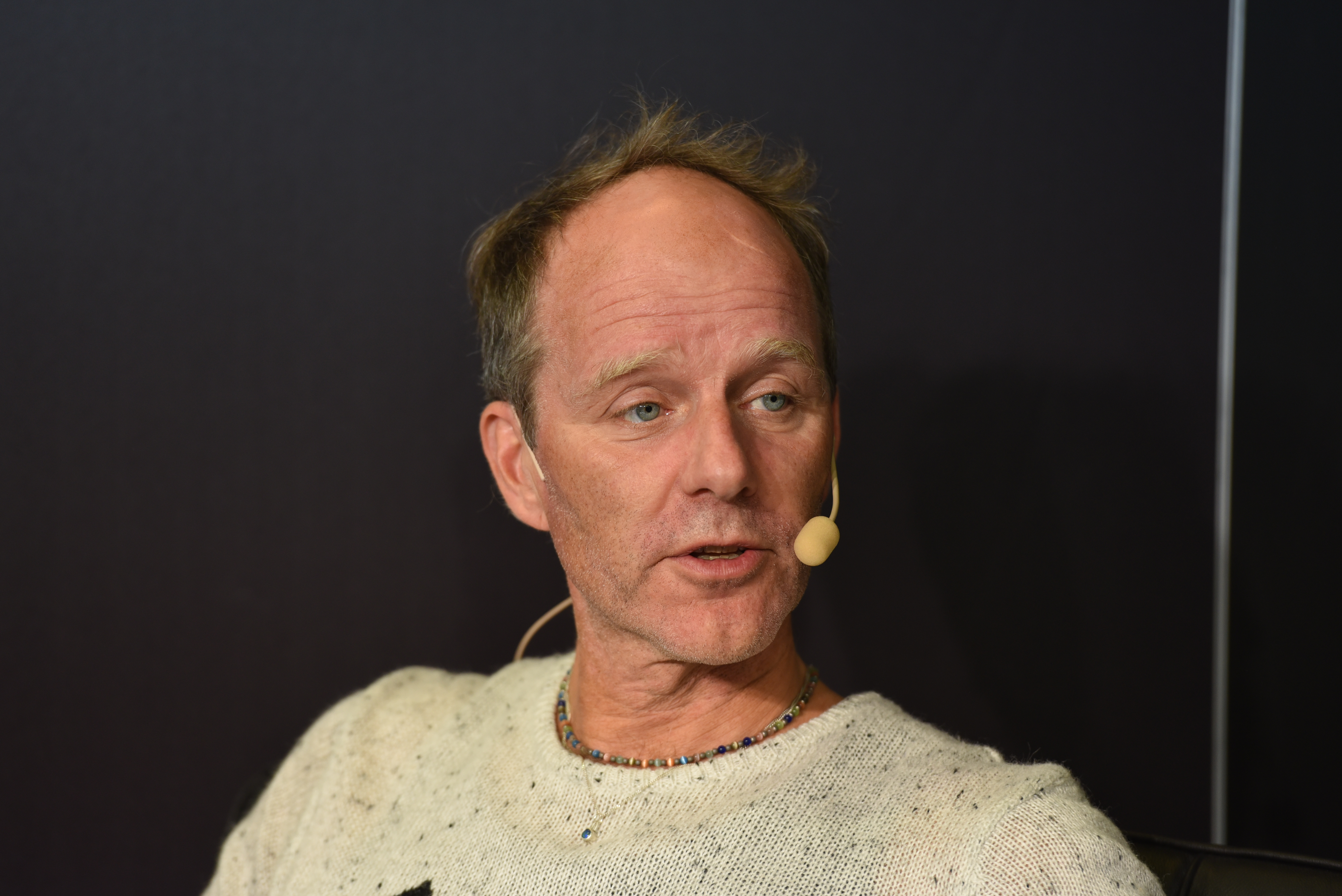
- Lindqvist in September 2017
- Born: 2 December 1968 (age 57); Blackeberg, Sweden
- Occupations: Novelist, short story writer
- Writing career
- Period: 2004–present
- Genre: Horror

John Ajvide Lindqvist (Swedish pronunciation: [jɔn ˈâjvɪdɛ ˈlɪ̂ŋːkvɪst]; born 2 December 1968) is a Swedish writer of horror novels and short stories. He is the husband of author Mia Ajvide and the father of author Fritiof Ajvide.

== Early life ==
Lindqvist was born and raised in the Stockholm suburb of Blackeberg. Before becoming a published writer, Lindqvist worked for 12 years as a stand-up comedian, and also for a time as a magician.

== Career ==
Lindqvist's debut novel, Let the Right One In (Låt den rätte komma in), a romantic vampire horror story published in 2004, enjoyed great success in Sweden and abroad. Handling the Undead (Hanteringen av odöda) was published in 2005 and involved the rising of the dead as zombies, referred to as the "re-living", in the Stockholm area.

In 2006, he released his third book, Pappersväggar (Paper Walls, published in English as Let the Old Dreams Die), a collection of short stories. In 2007, his story "Tindalos" was published as a serial in the Swedish newspaper Dagens Nyheter and as a free audiobook available through the newspaper's website, read by the author himself. His works are published in Sweden by Ordfront and have been translated into many languages, including English, Bulgarian, German, Italian, Spanish, Chinese, Hindi, Norwegian, Danish, French, Polish, Czech, Dutch and Russian.

Lindqvist was also a writer for the television series Reuter & Skoog (1999) and wrote the screenplays for Sveriges Television's drama series Kommissionen (2005) and the film Let the Right One In, based on his novel.

The production company Tre Vänner bought the film rights to Handling the Undead and were planning a future production. However, heavy interest in an American version led to the request to sell the rights to an American company. Lindqvist refused and the film went unmade. Tre Vänner's rights for an adaptation expired in 2012.

== Inspirations ==
Lindqvist is a Morrissey fan. The name of his debut novel was inspired by the Morrissey song "Let the Right One Slip In" and one of the short stories in Pappersväggar was named after the song "Shoplifters of the World Unite". The influence of Morrissey's music became pronounced in the actual plot of Harbour, where two of the main characters are devoted Morrissey fans who live out much of their lives by speaking in quotes from Morrissey's songs.

Lindqvist's father drowned , and the sea has appeared in several of his works as a dark and sinister force, such as in Handling the Undead and a short story in Pappersväggar. In Harbour the sea has a prominent role as a menacing presence and could be considered the villain of the novel. Furthermore, Let the Right One In features a pivotal near-drowning scene in a gym swimming pool.

== Bibliography ==
- 2004 – Låt den rätte komma in (Let the Right One In, 2007)
- 2005 – Hanteringen av odöda (Handling the Undead, 2009)
- 2006 – Pappersväggar (Paper Walls)
- 2008 – Människohamn (Harbour, 2010)
- 2010 – Lilla stjärna (Little Star, 2011)
- 2011 – Låt de gamla drömmarna dö (Let the Old Dreams Die)
- 2011 – Tjärven (name of a lighthouse island, see separate article)
- 2011 - The Music of Bengt Karlsson, Murderer
- 2011 - "Itsy Bitsy" (short story)
- 2012 - Sulky och Bebbe regerar okej (Sulky and Bebbe Rule Okay; with Mia Ajvide)
- 2013 - Fem kända musiker döda i seriekrock (Five Famous Musicians Dead in Pile-Up)
- 2013 - Come Unto Me
- 2014 - Himmelstrand (I Am Behind You(: The First Place))
- 2014 - "Speciella omständigheter" ("Special Circumstances"; short story)
- 2015 - Rörelsen: Den andra platsen (The Movement: The Second Place)
- 2016 - Våran hud, vårat blod, våra ben (Our Skin, Our Blood, Our Bones)
- 2017 - X: Den sista platsen (X: The Last Place) (I Am the Tiger)
- 2017 - The Keeper's Companion (novel i anthology Varsel i Mörkret)
- 2018 - Gräns (Border)
- 2021 - Vänligheten (The Kindness)
- 2022 - Verkligheten (The Reality)
- 2022 - Skriften i vattnet (The Writing in the Water) (Series: Blodstormen 1)
- 2023 - Sommaren 1985 (The Summer of 1985)
- 2024 - Rummet i jorden (The Room in the Ground) (Series: Blodstormen 2)
- 2025 - Anden i maskinen (Series: Blodstormen 3)
- 2025 - Svinen

=== Plays ===
- 2012 - Fem kända musiker döda i seriekrock
- 2012 - Ett informellt samtal om den nuvarande situationen
- 2014 - Storstugan - En pyromans berättelse

== Film and TV adaptions ==
- Let the Right One In (film) Sweden 2008
- Let Me In (film) USA 2010
- Border (film) Sweden 2018
- Let the Right One In (TV series) USA 2022
- Handling the Undead (film) Norway 2024
- Summer of 1985
