= Michel aus Lönneberga =

- Starring: Jan Ohlsson; Allan Edwall
- Opening theme: Du käre lille snickerbo by Jan Ohlsson
- Countries of origin: West Germany, Sweden
- Original language: Swedish
- No. of seasons: 1
- No. of episodes: 13

Production
- Running time: 24~27 minutes

Original release
- Network: SVT1; Das Erste
- Release: 1974 – 1976

Michel aus Lönneberga (or Emil i Lönneberga) is a West German-Swedish live-action television adaptation of Astrid Lindgren's novel series Emil i Lönneberga, based to some extent on the earlier films based on the franchise. As was established in the books, the recordings took place in Katthult in Kalmar län (part of the historical Småland), Sweden.

The Swedish audio for the show with subtitles became a big success throughout Scandinavia, with the opening theme and the phrases Förgrömmade unge ("Damned that child") and Snickerboa ("Crafting outhouse") becoming standard phrases even outside of Sweden well into the 2010s.

In Norway it aired on NRK1 and became a big enough success that the series was in syndication until the 2000s and eclipsed the films in popularity. The scene in episode 3, Kalaset i Katthult, where Emil hoisted Ida up to the top of a flagpole, was cut in NRK's version, to the dismay of the Swedish production team.

The show was also aired occasionally on DR1 in Denmark. There are no records of the show airing in Finland, where the films remained the main way to watch the franchise.

In West Germany, the show aired on Das Erste dubbed into German, where the show also gained some popularity.

When Denmark aired re-runs on DR Ramasjang, the Swedish voices had been replaced by a Danish dub as of 2019, causing some controversy in Denmark.

== Cast ==
- Jan Ohlsson as Michel
- Lena Wisborg as Ida
- Emy Storm as Alma
- Allan Edwall as Anton
- Maud Hansson as Lina
- Björn Gustafson as Alfred
- Carsta Löck as Krösa-Maja
- Hannelore Schroth as Miss Petrell
