= New Mischief by Emil =

1972 film

Nya hyss av Emil i Lönneberga
- Swedish DVD cover
- Directed by: Olle Hellbom
- Written by: Astrid Lindgren
- Based on: Emil i Lönneberga by Astrid Lindgren
- Produced by: Olle Nordemar
- Starring: Jan Ohlsson; Lena Wisborg; Allan Edwall; Emy Storm; Björn Gustafson; Maud Hansson
- Narrated by: Astrid Lindgren
- Music by: Georg Riedel
- Distributed by: Svensk Filmindustri
- Release date: 21 October 1972
- Running time: 94 minutes
- Country: Sweden
- Language: Swedish
- Box office: SEK 5.3 million (Sweden)

Nya hyss av Emil i Lönneberga is a 1972 Swedish film, the second of three films about the Emil i Lönneberga by Astrid Lindgren.

== Cast ==
- Jan Ohlsson as Emil Svensson
- Lena Wisborg as Ida Svensson
- Allan Edwall as Anton Svensson
- Emy Storm as Alma Svensson
- Björn Gustafson as Alfred
- Maud Hansson as Lina
- Georg Årlin as the priest
- Carsta Löck as Krösa-Maja
- Hannelore Schroth as fru Petrell
- Bertil Norström as the horse trader
- Paul Esser as the doctor
- Rudolf Schündler as the Mayor
- Stefan Grybe as the Mayor's son
