= Emil and the Piglet =

Emil och griseknoen
- Swedish DVD cover
- Directed by: Olle Hellbom
- Written by: Astrid Lindgren
- Based on: Emil i Lönneberga by Astrid Lindgren
- Produced by: Olle Nordemar
- Starring: Jan Ohlsson; Lena Wisborg; Allan Edwall; Emy Storm; Björn Gustafson; Maud Hansson
- Narrated by: Astrid Lindgren
- Music by: Georg Riedel
- Release date: 6 October 1973
- Running time: 96 minutes
- Country: Sweden
- Language: Swedish
- Box office: SEK 3.4 million (Sweden)

Emil and the Piglet (Swedish: Emil och griseknoen) is a 1973 Swedish film, the third of three films based on the Emil i Lönneberga books written by Astrid Lindgren. At the 10th Guldbagge Awards in 1974, Allan Edwall won the award for Best Actor.

== Cast ==
- Jan Ohlsson as Emil Svensson
- Lena Wisborg as Ida Svensson
- Allan Edwall as Anton Svensson
- Emy Storm as Alma Svensson
- Björn Gustafson as Alfred
- Maud Hansson as Lina
- Georg Årlin as the priest
- Carsta Löck as Krösa-Maja
- Hannelore Schroth as fru Petrell
- Jan Nygren as the auctioneer in Backhorva
- Pierre Lindstedt as Bulten i Bo
- Göthe Grefbo as Kråkstorparn
- Wilhelm Clason as Bastefallarn
- Curt Masreliez as a Good Templar
- Hans-Eric Stenborg as a Good Templar
- Sven Holmberg as a Good Templar
- Gisela Hahn as the lady teacher
