= Caligola (music project) =

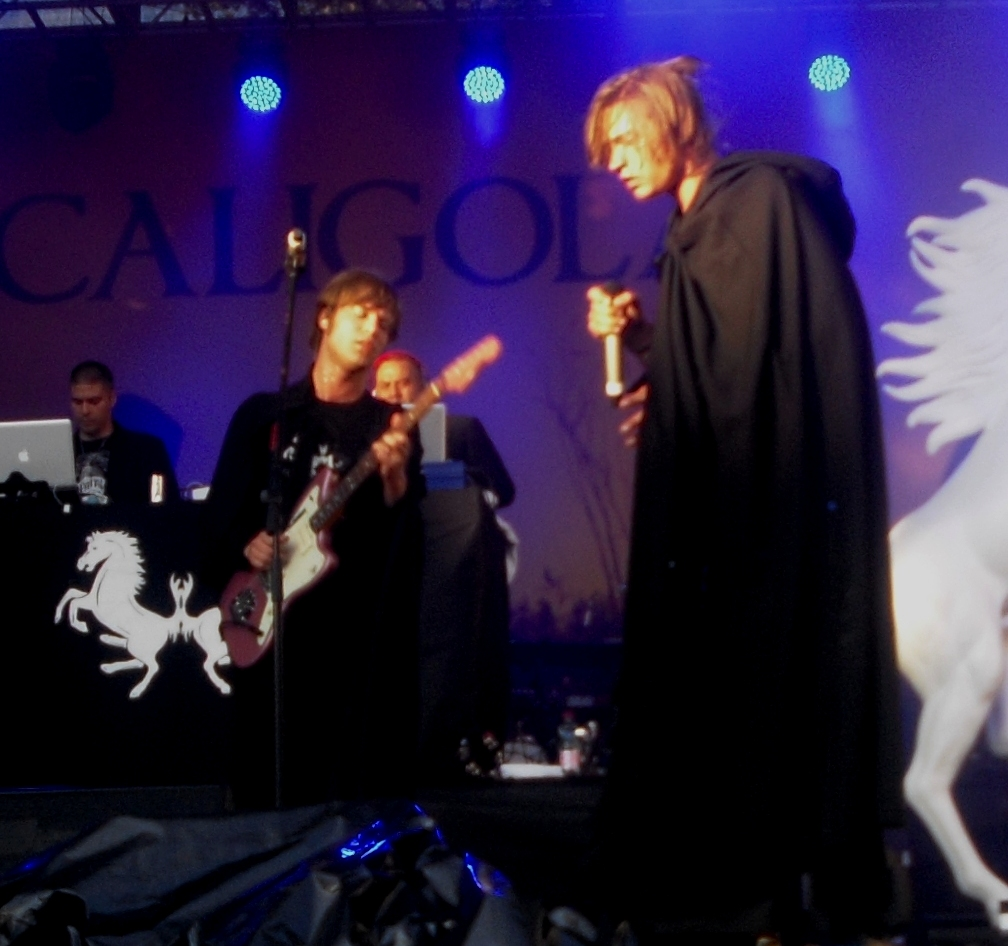
Caligola live performance

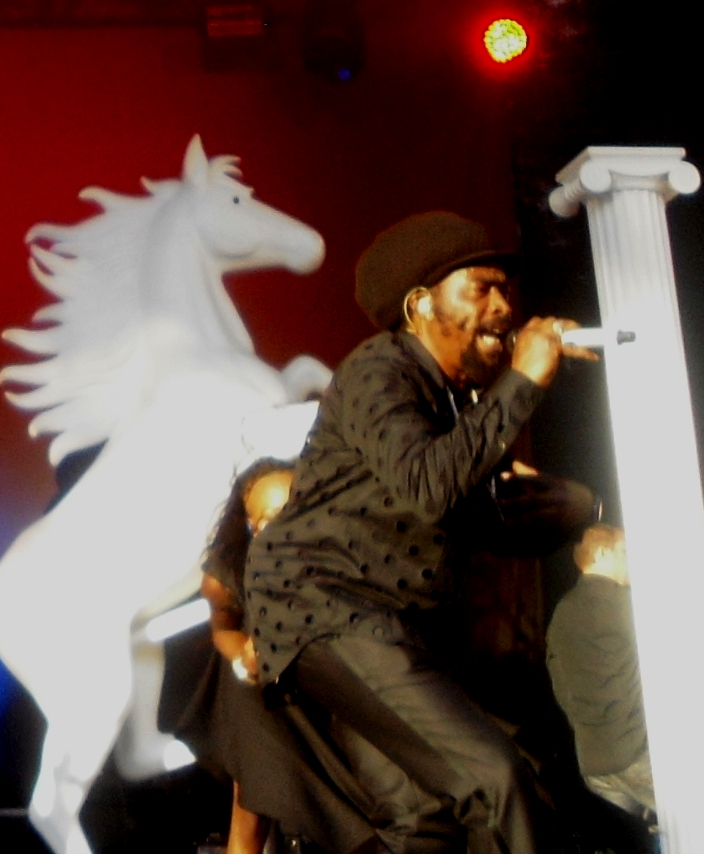
Caligola live performance

Caligola is a worldwide network of artists founded in Northern Italy in the 1970s, active in the underground of Stockholm (Sweden). In 2008, the artists' collective was joined by the two Swedish musicians Björn Dixgård and Gustaf Norén.

== History ==
The artists' collective, Caligola, was founded in the 1970s in Northern Italy. Her intention was to develop a worldwide collective of artists spanning diverse artistic genres to cooperatively create new art forms.

The name Caligola is derived from the Roman emperor Caligula who is most famous for his lavish, excessive style of living and his madness that reached its height when he made his favourite horse a Senator. Hence the two stallions in the music project's logo, referring both to Caligula and music's sexual energy. According to Gustaf Norén, the artists' collective Caligola is based on the idea of building a community; the black capes worn by performers represent the equality of artists and the renunciation of their differences. Their goal is to overcome conventions and borders and to expand and connect art in all its forms.

In 2008 Björn Dixgård and Gustaf Norén, the two frontmen of the Swedish rock band Mando Diao joined the International network of artists. The Swedish hip-hop producers Masse and Salla Salazar (The Salazar Brothers TSB), who are also members of the collective, produced Mando Diao's fifth album, “Give Me Fire” (2009) and, together with Dixgård and Norén, they launched the "Caligola music project" which was active in 2011 and 2012. In 2013, the project was put to an end.

== Development ==
The first public performance of Caligola took place at the after-show party of Rock am Ring Festival at the Nürburgring (Germany) in June 2011.

The project's first release was the video Sting Of Battle on Dec. 8, 2011 and the eponymous single on December 27, 2011. Forgive Forget, the second single from the album Back To Earth, was released on February 24, 2012.

Following the two singles, the album Back To Earth was released on March 2, 2012. The album is an amalgamation of different musical genres: pop, rock and soul, hip-hop, dance beats, jazz, funk and electro.

In November 2012, the re-release of "Back To Earth", Back To Earth - Resurrection, containing eight new songs, was published.

Alongside the founders of the music project, artists Natty Silver (reggae), Agnes (pop), Per "Rusträk" Johansson (jazz saxophone), Nils Jansson (jazz trumpet), Oskar Bonde (drums, Johnossi), Bo Hansson and Janne Carlsson (jazz), LaGalyia Frazier (gospel) and Paul van Dyk (DJ) participated in the recording. Other artists contributing to the album are: May Yamani, Lovisa Inserra, Bernd Harbauer, Frederik Andersson, Carlos Barth, Paulo Arraiano, Julia Dufvenius, Daniel Haglund, Ulises Infante, Alexandra Kinga Fekete, Daniel Annbjer, Carl-Johan Fogelklou, Marcelo Scorsese, Patrik Heikinpieti, Natty Silver, Malin-My Nilsson, Chepe Salazar, Jonte Wentzel, Andrea Doria Smith, Robert Bendrik, Krippe Ibaceta, Martina Montelius, Teresa Sida, Anders Marcus, Mathias Steur, Murray Trider, Danielle Turano, Saga Berlin, Ronny Burnout, Eva Millberg, Agnes Carlsson, Peter Eggers, Johannes Persson, Björn Andersson, Christopher Wollter, Sören Jensen, Chatrin Melander, Jan Carlsson, Erika Johansson and Channarong Khammuk.

Caligola began its first tour performing at festivals and events in Germany, Sweden, Switzerland, Luxembourg and Austria. The tour has included performances by Masse and Salla Salazar, along with Björn Dixgård, Gustaf Norén, Carl Johan Fogelklou (Mando Diao's bass player) and Mats Björke (Mando Diao's keyboarder) in shows called the Mando Diao DJ Set or Caligola DJ Set.

At shows, the constant members forming the band - Björn Dixgård, Gustaf Norén, Salla and Masse Salazar and Natty Silver, were joined by Mando Diao members Carl Johan Fogelklou and Mats Björke and were also performing as Mando Diao DJ Set or Caligola DJ Set auf. In September 2012, the Swedish hiphop singer Lazee was presented as new member of the performing group.

In 2012, in cooperation with Paul van Dyk, Caligola recorded a dancefloor version of the song Violetta’s Dance and released it under the name of If You Want My Love on van Dyk's album Evolution.

== Discography ==
=== Albums ===
- Back To Earth released on March 2, 2012
- Back To Earth - Resurrection released on November 30, 2012

=== Singles ===
- Sting Of Battle released on December 27, 2011
- Forgive Forget released on February 24, 2012
- My Sister Rising released on August 10, 2012
- I Want You released on November 30, 2012

=== Charts ===
==== Albums ====
Year	Details	Peak chart positions				Certifications (sales thresholds)
Year	Details	SWE	AUT	SWI	GER	Certifications (sales thresholds)
2012	Back To Earth: Released: March 2, 2012; Label: Universal	13 03w.	31 09w.	34 11w.	10 10w.	
2012	Back To Earth - Resurrection: Released: November 30, 2012; Label: Universal	-	-	-	-	
"—" denotes releases that did not chart or was not released.

==== Singles ====
Year	Details	Peak chart positions			Certifications (sales thresholds)
Year	Details	GER	SWI	AUT	Certifications (sales thresholds)
2011	Sting Of Battle: Released: Dec. 27, 2011; Label: Universal	—	—	—	
2012	Forgive Forget: Released: Feb. 24, 2012; Label: Universal	02 01w.	09 01w.	10 01w.	Gold status Germany
2012	My Sister Rising: Released: Aug. 10, 2012; Label: Universal	—	—	—	
2012	I Want You: Released: Nov. 30, 2012; Label: Universal	95 01w.	55 01w.	—	
"—" denotes releases that did not chart or was not released.

=== Videos ===
- Sting of Battle 2011
- Press Conference 2011
- Forgive Forget 2012
- Fire Burns Out A Weak Heart 2012
- Forgive Forget TSB Remix 2012
- Initiation - The Caligola Movie 2012
- My Sister Rising 2012
- I Want You 2012
- Smash Dem Brains In 2012

== Achievements and awards ==
The single Forgive Forget reached gold status in Germany on May 24, 2012.
