= Emil i Lönneberga (film) =

1971 film

- Swedish DVD cover
- Directed by: Olle Hellbom
- Written by: Astrid Lindgren
- Based on: Emil i Lönneberga by Astrid Lindgren
- Produced by: Olle Nordemar
- Starring: Jan Ohlsson; Lena Wisborg; Allan Edwall; Emy Storm; Björn Gustafson; Maud Hansson
- Narrated by: Astrid Lindgren
- Music by: Georg Riedel
- Distributed by: Svensk Filmindustri
- Release date: 4 December 1971
- Running time: 98 minutes
- Country: Sweden
- Language: Swedish
- Box office: SEK 11 million (Sweden)

Emil i Lönneberga is a 1971 Swedish film, the first of three films based on the Emil i Lönneberga books written by Astrid Lindgren.

It was the highest grossing film in Sweden released in 1971.

== Cast ==
- Jan Ohlsson as Emil Svensson
- Lena Wisborg as Ida Svensson
- Allan Edwall as Anton Svensson
- Emy Storm as Alma Svensson
- Björn Gustafson as Alfred
- Maud Hansson as Lina
- Mimi Pollak as Lillklossan
- Georg Årlin as the priest
- Carsta Löck as Krösa-Maja
- Isa Quensel as the voice of Krösa-Maja
- Hannelore Schroth as fru Petrell
- Ellen Widmann as Kommandoran
- Gus Dahlström as Stolle-Jocke
- Hildur Lindberg as Vibergskan
- Paul Esser as the doctor
- Astrid Lindgren as the Narrator
