= Christopher Wollter =

Swedish actor

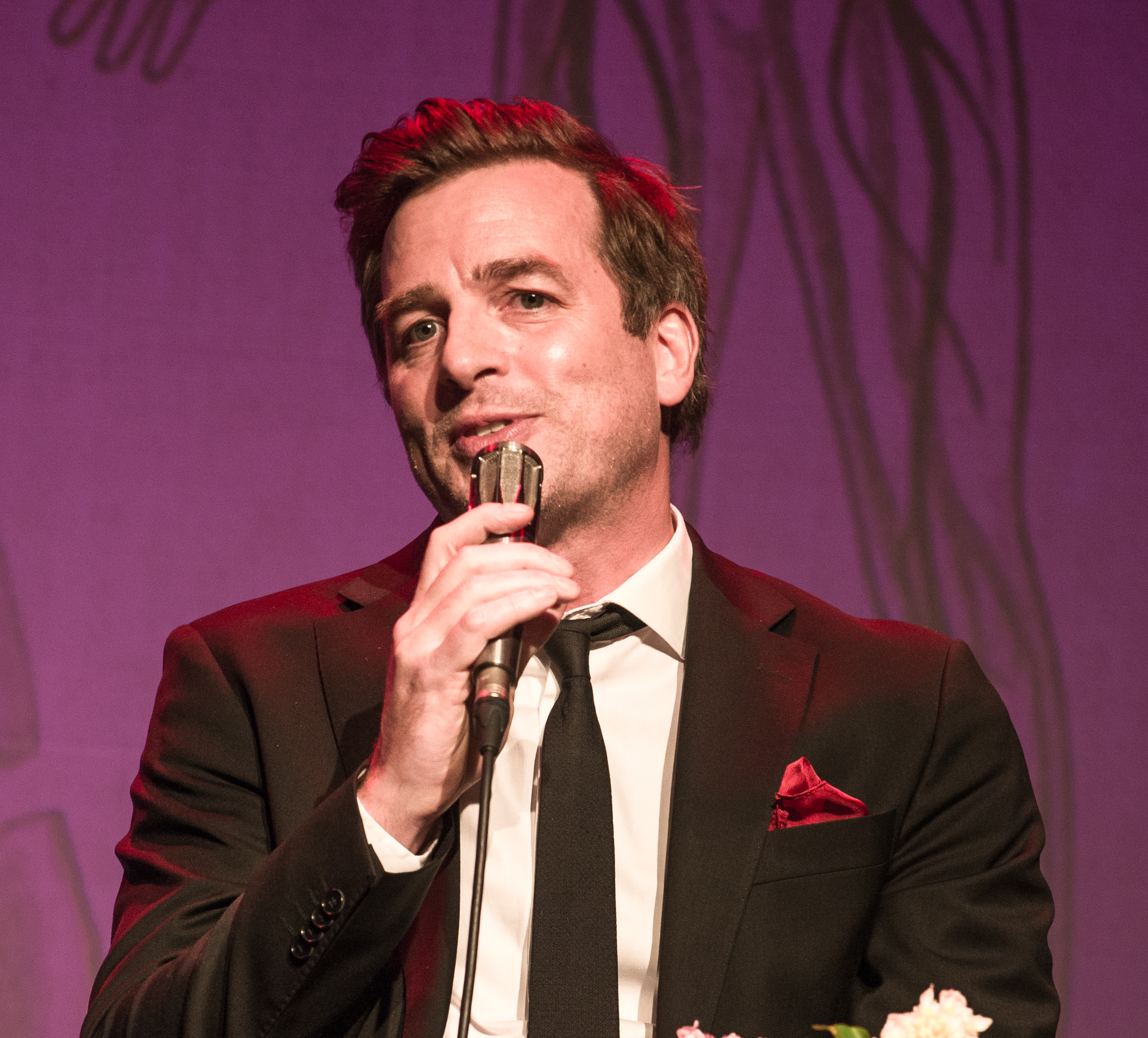
- Wollter in 2019
- Born: Claes Brian Christopher Wollter; 5 February 1972 (age 54); Upplands-Bro, Sweden
- Occupation: Actor
- Spouse: Julia Dufvenius
- Children: 2
- Relatives: Sven Wollter (great-uncle)

Claes Brian Christopher Wollter (born 5 February 1972) is a Swedish actor and singer. He has had roles in the Swedish productions of West Side Story and Miss Saigon. He has also appeared in several television productions.

== Early life ==
Wollter was born on 5 February 1972 in Brunna, Sweden. He grew up in Lund and attended Lerbäckskolan and Spyken. As a teenager, Wollter was a reporter for the SVT children's television show Barnjournalen for a year. He graduated from the Högskolan för scen och musik (Academy of Music and Drama) at the University of Gothenburg in 1997. Wollter had previously studied at Kulturama in Stockholm.

== Career ==
After graduation, his first stage role was as Marius Pontmercy in the musical Les Misérables. Wollter then played Chris in the musical Miss Saigon at Malmö Opera. He has also starred in productions of My Fair Lady at the Oscarsteatern, Evita, as Freddie in Chess, Riff in West Side Story, and portrayed the title role in a production of Doctor Zhivago. Wollter appeared in Martina Montelius' Elda! Elda! Elda! at the Teater Brunnsgatan Fyra, and in Who's Afraid of Virginia Woolf?. Between 2017 and 2018, he portrayed Georg von Trapp in The Sound of Music at Nöjesteatern in Malmö.

Wollter's film debut was in Suxxess (2002). He appeared in The Reunion in 2013, which won the Guldbagge Award for Best Film. He has also starred in the television dramas Häxdansen (2008), Modus (2015), Greyzone (2018), and Quicksand (2019), and the entertainment shows; Så ska det låta, Doobidoo, and Lotta på Liseberg.

He has also produced the concert performance Brel möter Piaf with Åsa Fång in 2018 at the Scalateatern, performed as a soloist with the Swedish Radio Symphony Orchestra as part of SVT's Trettondagskonsert at the Berwaldhallen, and delivered the self-written monologue Göran och Kärleke.

He participated as a celebrity dancer in Let's Dance 2025 broadcast on TV4.

== Personal life ==
Wollter is married to actress Julia Dufvenius. They have a daughter and a son. His great-uncle is actor Sven Wollter.
