= Back to Earth =

Back to Earth may refer to:

- Back to Earth (Lisa Ekdahl album)
- Back to Earth (Cat Stevens album)
- Back to Earth (Battle album)
- Back to Earth (Rare Earth album)
- Back to Earth (Caligola album)
- "Back to Earth", a song by Cosmic Gate from the album No More Sleep, 2002
- "Back to Earth", a song by Steve Aoki featuring Fall Out Boy from the album Neon Future I, 2014
- Red Dwarf: Back to Earth, a three-part mini-series of the TV show Red Dwarf
- Back to Earth, a 1918 Broadway play by William LeBaron
