= Modus (TV series) =

Swedish psychological thriller TV series (2015-2017)

- Genre: Psychological thriller
- Based on: Pengemannen by Anne Holt
- Developed by: Mai Brostrøm; Peter Thorsboe
- Written by: Mai Brostrøm; Anne Holt; Peter Thorsboe
- Directed by: Lisa Siwe; Mani Maserrat Agah
- Starring: Melinda Kinnaman; Henrik Norlén; Esmeralda Struwe; Simon J. Berger; Annika Hallin; Gerhard Hoberstorfer; Björn Andersson; Lily Wahlsteen
- Composer: Jacob Groth
- Country of origin: Sweden
- Original languages: Swedish; English
- No. of seasons: 2
- No. of episodes: 16

Production
- Cinematography: Erik Persson; Linda Wassberg
- Editors: Robert Nordh; Michal Leszczyloski; Marinella Angusti; Lars Gustafson; Hakan Karlsson
- Running time: 45 minutes

Original release
- Network: TV4
- Release: 23 September 2015 – 19 June 2017

Modus is a Swedish television psychological thriller series, directed by Lisa Siwe and Mani Maserrat, based upon the novel Frukta inte by Norwegian author and lawyer Anne Holt and adapted for television by Emmy Award winning writers Mai Brostrøm and Peter Thorsboe. The series follows the work of Inger Johanne Vik (Melinda Kinnaman), a Swedish criminal psychologist and profiler, who has previously assisted both the Swedish police and the FBI in the United States.

The first eight-part series was premièred on TV4 in September 2015. A second eight-part series, written in Swedish and English, was filmed in 2017, with American actors Kim Cattrall and Greg Wise among the new cast members. This series began broadcasting on TV4 on 2 November 2017.

In the United States, both seasons were originally aired on PBS, and later were temporarily available for streaming via the PBS Passport program.

== Synopsis ==
In the first series, Inger Johanne's eldest daughter, Stina, who is autistic, unwittingly witnesses a contract killing when the family attend a wedding at a local hotel. The murderer surprisingly saves Stina's life, without giving away his identity. Inger decides to return to work with police detective Ingvar Nyman to assist in solving the crime. They discover that they are pursuing a hit man, working for an American religious sect.

In the second series, President of the United States Helen Tyler goes missing during a state visit to Sweden. Inger Johanne is partnered with Nyman and detailed to work with Warren Schifford, an FBI agent and Special Advisor to the president, to investigate. Vik and Schifford have history, dating from her time with the FBI.

== Cast ==
- Melinda Kinnaman as Inger Johanne Vik; criminal psychologist and profiler
- Henrik Norlén as Ingvar Nymann; police inspector
- Esmeralda Struwe as Stina Vik; Inger's elder daughter
- Simon J. Berger as Isak Aronson; Inger's ex-husband and the father of her two daughters
- Annika Hallin as Hedvig Nyström; police pathologist
- Gerhard Hoberstorfer as Bo Sundberg; police detective
- Björn Andersson as Alfred Nyman; Ingvar's father
- Lily Wahlsteen as Linnea Vik; Inger's younger daughter

=== Series 1 (2015) ===
- Marek Oravec as Richard Forrester
- Magnus Roosmann as Marcus Ståhl
- Peter Jöback as Rolf Ljungberg
- Johan Widerberg as Lukas Lindgren
- Krister Henriksson as Erik Lindgren
- Liv Mjönes as Patricia Green
- Cecilia Nilsson as Elisabeth Lindgren
- Josefine Tengblad as Sophie Dahlberg
- Ellen Mattsson as Astrid Friberg
- Primus Lind as Noah Ståhl
- Eva Melander as Marianne Larsson
- Julia Dufvenius as Isabella Levin
- Simon Norrthon as Lennart Carlsson
- Stephen Rappaport as Jacob Lindstrom
- Christoffer Jareståhl as Robin Larsson
- Anki Lidén as Gunilla Larsson
- Philip Martin as Hakim Hammar

=== Series 2 (2017) ===
- Kim Cattrall as Helen Tyler; the President of the United States
- Greg Wise as Warren Schifford; an FBI agent and Senior Advisor
- Martin Marquez as Hunter Russell; Secret Service Agent
- Lachele Carl as Lori Reed; United States Ambassador to Sweden
- Billy Campbell as Dale Tyler; First Gentleman
- Emilia Poma as Zoe Tyler; First Daughter
- Paprika Steen as Alva Roos; Chief Inspector
- Johan Rabaeus as Harald Bohman; Prime Minister of Sweden
- Bijan Daneshmand as Mahmoud Muntasir; an oil industry billionaire
- Samuel Fröler as Torbjörn Skoglund
- Anja Lundqvist as Jessica Östlund
- Lo Kauppi as Linda Clason
- Nina Zanjani as Philippa
- Christopher Wollter as Tobias Magnusson
- Sigge Eklund as Gustav
- Jonas Malmsjö as Oscar Ek
- Sasha Behar as Raja Cooper

== Episodes ==
=== Series 1 (2015) ===
No.	Title	Directed by	Written by	Air date	Viewers (million)
1	"Episode 1"	Lisa Siwe	Mai Brostrøm & Peter Thorsboe	23 September 2015	N/A
2	"Episode 2"	Lisa Siwe	Mai Brostrøm & Peter Thorsboe	23 September 2015	N/A
3	"Episode 3"	Lisa Siwe	Mai Brostrøm & Peter Thorsboe	7 October 2015	N/A
4	"Episode 4"	Lisa Siwe	Mai Brostrøm & Peter Thorsboe	14 October 2015	N/A
5	"Episode 5"	Mani Maserrat	Mai Brostrøm & Peter Thorsboe	21 October 2015	N/A
6	"Episode 6"	Mani Maserrat	Mai Brostrøm & Peter Thorsboe	28 October 2015	N/A
7	"Episode 7"	Mani Maserrat	Mai Brostrøm & Peter Thorsboe	4 November 2015	N/A
8	"Episode 8"	Mani Maserrat	Mai Brostrøm & Peter Thorsboe	11 November 2015	N/A

=== Series 2 (2017) ===
No.	Title	Directed by	Written by	Air date	Viewers (million)
1	"Episode 1"	Lisa Siwe	Mai Brostrøm & Peter Thorsboe	2 November 2017	N/A
2	"Episode 2"	Lisa Siwe	Mai Brostrøm & Peter Thorsboe	9 November 2017	N/A
3	"Episode 3"	Lisa Siwe	Mai Brostrøm & Peter Thorsboe	16 November 2017	N/A
4	"Episode 4"	Lisa Siwe	Mai Brostrøm & Peter Thorsboe	23 November 2017	N/A
5	"Episode 5"	Håkan Lindhé	Mai Brostrøm & Peter Thorsboe	30 November 2017	N/A
6	"Episode 6"	Håkan Lindhé	Mai Brostrøm & Peter Thorsboe	5 December 2017	N/A
7	"Episode 7"	Håkan Lindhé	Mai Brostrøm & Peter Thorsboe	12 December 2017	N/A
8	"Episode 8"	Håkan Lindhé	Mai Brostrøm & Peter Thorsboe	19 December 2017	N/A
