= Georg Årlin =

Swedish actor (1916–1992)

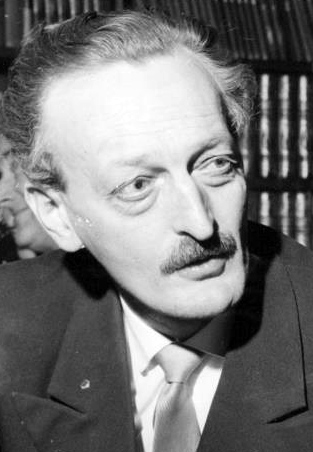
- Årlin in 1962
- Born: George Adolf Wilhelm Årlin; 30 December 1916; Rödeby, Sweden
- Died: 27 June 1992 (aged 75); Lövestad, Sweden
- Occupation: Actor
- Years active: 1940-1988

Georg Adolf Wilhelm Årlin (30 December 1916 – 27 June 1992) was a Swedish film actor who appeared in 50 films between 1940 and 1988. Born in Rödeby, a southern Sweden locality in Blekinge County's Karlskrona Municipality, Georg Årlin died in Lövestad at the age of 75.

== Partial filmography ==
- Vi Masthuggspojkar (1940) - Pelle Nyman
- The Ghost Reporter (1941) - Editor (uncredited)
- Lasse-Maja (1941) - Priest
- Snapphanar (1941) - Guerilla soldier (uncredited)
- Prästen som slog knockout (1943) - Merchant Bergquist (uncredited)
- Natt i hamn (1943) - Detective (uncredited)
- Kungajakt (1944) - Chaplain
- The Journey Away (1945) - Hotel guest (uncredited)
- I Love You Karlsson (1947) - Karlsson senior (uncredited)
- Barabbas (1953) - Lazarus
- Kärlek på turné (1955) - Hotel clerk
- Blue Sky (1955) - Lundberg
- Åsa-Nisse in Military Uniform (1958) - Doctor
- Laila (1958) - Parish constable
- The Judge (1960) - Manager Randel
- Gøngehøvdingen (1961) - Colonel Sparre
- Swedish Wedding Night (1964) - Johan Borg
- Lockfågeln (1971) - Svanhals
- Emil i Lönneberga (1971) - Prästen
- New Mischief by Emil (1972) - Prästen
- Cries and Whispers (1972) - Fredrik
- Inferno (1973, TV Movie) - Friend in Lund
- Emil och griseknoen (1973) - Prästen
- Skärseld (1975) - Brunetto Latini
- Release the Prisoners to Spring (1975) - Rådman
- The Brothers Lionheart (1977) - Tengil
- The Simple-Minded Murderer (1982) - Parish Constable (uncredited)
- Fanny and Alexander (1982) - Colonel - Teatern
- Vargens tid (1988) - Tilo
- Flickan vid stenbänken (1989, TV Series) - Kusken
