= Caligula (disambiguation) =

Caligula was a Roman Emperor.

His name is understood to be derived from Caligae, heavy-soled hobnailed military sandal-boots known for being issued to Roman legionary soldiers and auxiliaries throughout the Roman Republic.

Caligula may also refer to:

== Film, theatre, and television ==
- Caligula (play), a 1938 play by Albert Camus
- Caligula, a 1968 tragedy by John Crowne
- Caligula (film), a 1979 film about the emperor
- Caligula 2 (film), a 1982 film about the emperor
- Caligula (TV series), a 2018 anime television series
- Yellowjackets (TV series), a Showtime drama series featuring an African Grey parrot named Caligula

== Music ==
- Caligula (band), an Australian pop/rock band
- Caligula (musical), a 2004 rock musical by Eric Svejcar
- Caligula (Glanert), a 2006 opera by Detlev Glanert
- Caligula, a 1671 opera by Giovanni Maria Pagliardi

=== Albums ===
- Caligvla, a 2012 album by Ex Deo
- Caligula (Anthony Jeselnik album), a 2013 album by Anthony Jeselnik
- Caligula Theme Music, a 2014 album by Lee Bannon
- Caligula, a 2008 album by Hästpojken
- Caligula (Lingua Ignota album), a 2019 album by Lingua Ignota

=== Songs ===
- "Caligula", a 1989 song by The Dickies from Second Coming
- "Caligula", a song by Modey Lemon from Modey Lemon
- "Caligula", a song by Macy Gray on On How Life Is

== Other uses ==
- Caligula (horse), an Thoroughbred racehorse
- Caligula (moth), a genus of moths
- Raziel (wrestler) or Caligula, professional wrestler

== See also ==
- Caligola (music project), Italian artists' collective
- The Caligula Effect, a 2016 role-playing video game
- Emperor Magus Caligula (born 1973), vocalist for Dark Funeral
