= Lönneberga =

- Location within Kalmar Location within Sweden
- Coordinates: 57°33′0.03″N 15°43′21.49″E
- Country: Sweden
- Province: Småland
- County: Kalmar
- Municipality: Hultsfred

Population (31 December 2010)
  - Total: 167
  - Density: 3.37/km^{2} (8.7/sq mi)
- Time zone: UTC+1 (CET)
  - Summer (DST): UTC+2 (CEST)

Lönneberga is a village and parish in Hultsfred Municipality in the Swedish county of Kalmar County in the region of Småland. In 2000 the parish had 1323 inhabitants on 94 square kilometers, of which 190 lived in the village.

Lönneberga is situated around 12 km (7.5 mi) north-west of Hultsfred, around 20 km (12 mi) south-west of Vimmerby. Lönneberga is mostly known from the children's books by Astrid Lindgren about Emil i Lönneberga. It is also the birthplace of artist and writer Albert Engström as well as motorcycle designer Oscar Hedström.
