= Britt Edwall =

Swedish media personality/author (1935–2025)

Edwall in 1995

Britt Elin Edwall (16 February 1935 – July 2025) was a Swedish television and radio presenter and author.

== Life and career ==
Edwall studied theatre history at Stockholm University, and in 1957 became chairman of the Stockholm Student Theatre. From 1963 to 1996 she worked at Sveriges Radio, and during the 1990s she was a regular contributor to Dagens Nyheter.

In 1994, Edwall made a radio play, Ur djupet av en massakrerad ömtålighet (From the Depths of a Massacred Fragility), based on Nikanor Teratologen's novel Äldreomsorgen i Övre Kågedalen. In 2001, Edwall dramatised Helen Zahavi's novel Dirty Weekend under the title En vedervärdig vecka (A Vile Week), which was broadcast in three parts on the Swedish Radio Theatre.

From 1957 to 1965, Edwall was married to actor Allan Edwall; the marriage produced three children.

On 10 July 2025, it was announced that Edwall had died aged 90.
