= Robert Lugn =

Swedish Army major general

- Born: Per Erik Robert Lugn; 12 February 1923; Uppsala, Sweden
- Died: 16 April 2016 (aged 93); Vallentuna, Sweden
- Relatives: Kristina Lugn (daughter); Martina Montelius (granddaughter)
- Military career
- Allegiance: Sweden
- Branch: Swedish Army
- Service years: 1948–1988
- Rank: Major General
- Commands: Chief of the Army Staff; General Staff Corps; Chief of Home Guard

Major General Per Erik Robert Lugn (12 February 1923 – 16 April 2016) was a Swedish Army officer. His senior commands include Chief of the Army Staff and the General Staff Corps (1979–1983) and the Chief of Home Guard (1983–1988).

== Early life ==
Lugn was born on 12 February 1923 in Uppsala, Sweden, the son of the museum curators Pehr Lugn and Gunhild (née Henschen). He passed studentexamen in 1947 and attended the Military Academy Karlberg in 1948 and was commissioned as an officer the same year and assigned as a second lieutenant in Skaraborg Regiment (P 4).

== Career ==
=== Military career ===
Lugn was promoted to lieutenant in 1950 and attended the Royal Swedish Army Staff College in from 1955 to 1957 and conducted military studies in Germany, Belgium and The Netherlands in 1956. He became captain of the General Staff Corps in 1960 and was appointed section chief in the Organisation Department of the Army Staff. Lugn conducted military studies in Norway in 1961.

In 1965, Lugn served in the Swedish Battalion in Cyprus, part of the United Nations Peacekeeping Force in Cyprus (UNFICYP) and in 1966 he was promoted to major of the General Staff Corps. He was promoted to lieutenant colonel of the General Staff Corps in 1968 and served in Göta Life Guards (P 1) in 1970. In 1972, Lugn was promoted to colonel of the General Staff Corps and appointed section chief in the Army Staff. From 1975 to 1977, he served as acting regimental commander of Hälsinge Regiment (I 14) and Gävleborg Defence District (Gävleborgs försvarsområde, Fo 49) when he was promoted to senior colonel and was appointed Chief of Staff of the Western Military District. Lugn was promoted to major general and appointed Chief of the Army Staff and Chief of the General Staff Corps in 1979.

As Chief of the Army Staff, he led the difficult balancing work between quality and quantity in the conscript army within the given financial framework. His written instructions to the staff were marked by a good pen. They expressed his enduring interest in quality in the army's war organization. Lugn's interaction with the staff members was characterized by consideration pairing with great humor. His laid-back leadership style created a good atmosphere that eased employees' sometimes heavy workload. Lugn then served as Chief of Home Guard from 1 October 1983.

As Chief of Home Guard, Lugn made radical changes to the Home Guard. He got the servicemen to accept that they belonged to an army unit and introduced military training to all servicemen. It was revolutionary for the Home Guard, which until then admittedly received weapons training but very little unit training. Now the servicemen were trained in groups and also in working platoons and the training included all the elements that a soldier needs to be able to have. He also made sure that the platoons got heavier weapons such as machine guns and recoilless rifles. Lugn also took hold of the higher education of the commander and introduced a higher education of circuit Home Guard commanders, which led to competence as battalion commander. Lugn served as Chief of Home Guard until his retirement on 1 March 1988.

=== Other work ===
Lugn was an expert in 1960 and the 1972 Conscription Investigation and in the 1966 Conscription Commission (1966 års värnpliktskommission) as well as in the Swedish Armed Forces Peace Organization Investigation (Försvarets fredsorganisationsutredning, FFU). He was also a member of the Real Estate Board of the Swedish Armed Forces (Försvarets fastighetsnämnd) Lugn was chairman of the Swedish Pistol Shooting Association (Svenska pistolskytteförbundet) from 1979 to 1985 and of the Swedish Defence Automobile Association (Försvarets motorklubb) from 1983 to 1986. He was also secretary in the Royal Swedish Academy of War Sciences from 1988 to 1990.

== Personal life ==
In 1947, Lugn married Brita-Stina Alinder (1925–2018), the daughter of Nimrod Alinder and Bricken (née Udén). He was the father of Kristina (1948–2020), Anders (born 1951) and Magnus (1956–2013).

== Death ==
Lugn died on 16 April 2016 and was interred on 30 June 2016 at Vallentuna Cemetery.

== Dates of rank ==
- 1948 – Second lieutenant
- 1950 – Lieutenant
- 1960 – Captain
- 1966 – Major
- 1968 – Lieutenant colonel
- 1975 – Colonel
- 1977 – Senior colonel
- 1979 – Major general

== Awards and decorations ==
=== Swedish ===
- (Sweden) Knight of the Order of the Sword (1966)
- (Sweden) Home Guard Medal of Merit in gold
- (Sweden) Swedish Women's Voluntary Defence Organization Royal Medal of Merit
- (Sweden) Swedish Central Federation for Voluntary Military Training Medal of Merit in gold
- (Sweden) National Association of Volunteer Motor Transport Corps Medal of Merit in gold
- (Sweden) National Federation of Voluntary Motor Cycle Corps Medal of Merit in gold (Frivilliga Motorcykelkårernas Riksförbunds förtjänstmedalj i guld, FMCKGM)
- (Sweden) Swedish Association of Women’s Auxiliary Driver Corps Royal Medal in gold (Sveriges Kvinnliga Bilkårers riksförbunds kungliga medalj, SKBRGM)
- (Sweden) Swedish Shooting Sport Federation's Bernadotte Medal
- (Sweden) Skaraborg County Officers’ Association's Silver Medal (Skaraborgs befälsförbunds silvermedalj)

=== Foreign ===
- (United States) Officer of the Legion of Merit

== Honours ==
- Member of the Royal Swedish Academy of War Sciences (1973)

Military offices
Preceded by Bengt Rasin	Chief of Staff of the Western Military District; 1977–1979	Succeeded by Gustaf Welin
Preceded by Gösta Hökmark	Chief of the Army Staff General Staff Corps; 1979–1983	Succeeded by Krister Larsson
Preceded by Karl Eric Holm	Chief of Home Guard; 1983–1988	Succeeded by Lars-Eric Wahlgren
