= The Venetian (film) =

1958 film by Ingmar Bergman

- Based on: La Venexiana by an anonymous 16th century Italian playwright
- Written by: Bertil Bodén; Giacomo Oreglia
- Directed by: Ingmar Bergman
- Starring: Maud Hansson
- Country of origin: Sweden
- Original language: Swedish

Production
- Producer: Henrik Dyfverman
- Running time: 56 minutes

Original release
- Release: 21 February 1958

The Venetian (Swedish: Venetianskan) is a 1958 Swedish television drama film directed by Ingmar Bergman, based on the 16th century Italian play La Venexiana written by an anonymous playwright.

== Cast ==
- Maud Hansson – Nena, servant-girl
- Sture Lagerwall – Bernardo
- Gunnel Lindblom – Valeria
- Helena Reuterblad – Oria, Valeria's servant-girl
- Eva Stiberg – Angela
- Folke Sundquist – Julio
