= Saraband =

2003 film

- Swedish release poster
- Written by: Ingmar Bergman
- Directed by: Ingmar Bergman
- Starring: Liv Ullmann; Erland Josephson; Börje Ahlstedt; Julia Dufvenius; Gunnel Fred
- Country of origin: Sweden; Italy; Germany; Finland; Denmark; Austria
- Original languages: Swedish; English; German

Production
- Cinematography: Stefan Eriksson; Jesper Holmström; Per-Olof Lantto; Sofi Stridh; Raymond Wemmenlöv
- Editor: Sylvia Ingemarsson
- Running time: 107 minutes (Swedish TV); 120 minutes (International theatrical)

Original release
- Network: SVT 1
- Release: December 1, 2003

Saraband is a 2003 Swedish drama film directed by Ingmar Bergman, and his final film. It was made for Swedish television, but released theatrically in a longer cut outside Sweden. Its United States theatrical release, with English subtitles, was in July 2005. The Swedish television version is 107 minutes, while theatrical releases run just under 2 hours.

The story is a sequel to Bergman's Scenes from a Marriage (1973), bringing back the characters of Johan and Marianne. It is a co-production of Sweden, Italy, Germany, Finland, Denmark, and Austria.

== Plot ==
The film is structured around ten acts with a prologue and epilogue.

It opens with the camera on Marianne standing by a table covered with photographs. It is a well-lit room, and she addresses the viewer. She picks one picture up after another; they are in no particular order, being just heaped all over the table. Some make her smile, or elicit a comment or a sigh. But then she picks up a photograph of her husband, prompting her to reminisce about how they had been more or less happy, and how they'd broken up. She goes on to recall how his second marriage failed, while she was already married to a second husband herself, and then when her second husband died (by flying a glider off somewhere and disappearing), she reflects that it would be nice to see her first husband again.

Marianne travels into the country to the home of her ex-husband Johan, the father of her daughters Martha and Sara. Johan is undergoing a family crisis with his insolvent and needy son, Henrik, and granddaughter, Karin. Karin is 19, and Henrik asks Johan for an advance on his inheritance so that Henrik can buy Karin an old Fagnola cello, to make a better impression at the audition for the European music conservatory. The elderly Johan decides to consider the offer and to contact the cello dealer himself. While Henrik is away tending to the orchestra he conducts in Uppsala, Johan has a private meeting with Karin, informing her of a proposal from Ivan Chablov, head conductor in the St. Petersburg orchestra and an old friend of Johan, that Karin join him at the prestigious Sibelius Academy in Helsinki.

While considering this offer Karin also finds an old letter from her departed mother Anna written to Henrik a week before her death. In the letter, Anna asks Henrik to relieve Karin of the unhealthy control he holds over her as her cello teacher. When Henrik encounters Karin again upon his return from Uppsala, where he no longer holds a position as concertmaster, he attempts to convince Karin into performing a concert of Bach's Cello Suites with him. She finally confronts him about his control over her and tells him of her decision to take an opportunity to study with her friend Emma in Hamburg under Claudio Abbado. The final request by Henrik is that Karin play the sarabande from Bach's 5th Cello Suite, which she already knows.

We encounter Marianne and Johan some time later, after Karin has already left for Hamburg. Marianne receives a phone call stating that Henrik has been found in the hospital having attempted suicide with pills and by cutting his wrists and throat. In the next scene a pained Johan suffering from a sort of anxiety attack seeks out Marianne and eventually disrobes along with her and joins her in bed. Next, Marianne is holding a still of the couple in bed and explaining what happened after that episode. She explains how she and Johan had kept in contact until one day she was no longer able to reach him. She thinks again of the departed Anna and recollects a visit to her ill daughter Martha who is in a sanatorium. She explains the contact she shared with her daughter and how she had never really been able to touch her before this moment.

== Cast ==
- Liv Ullmann – Marianne
- Erland Josephson – Johan
- Börje Ahlstedt – Henrik
- Julia Dufvenius – Karin
- Gunnel Fred – Martha

== Reception ==
On review aggregate website Rotten Tomatoes, the film holds an approval rating of 91% based on 85 reviews, with an average score of 7.85. The website's critical consensus reads, "If Saraband appears to be a minor entry in Ingmar Bergman's filmography, it's still an accomplished piece of work from one of cinema's greatest masters." Roger Ebert called the film "powerfully, painfully honest" and gave the film four stars out of four. The film ranked 9th on Cahiers du Cinéma's Top 10 Films of the Year List in 2004.
