= That Boy Emil =

- Film poster
- Swedish: Emil & Ida i Lönneberga
- Directed by: Per Åhlin; Alicja Björk; Lasse Persson
- Written by: Hans Åke Gabrielsson
- Based on: Emil i Lönneberga by Astrid Lindgren
- Produced by: Lars Blomgren
- Narrated by: Astrid Lindgren (archives)
- Music by: Georg Riedel
- Production company: Filmlance International
- Distributed by: Svensk Filmindustri
- Release date: 25 December 2013
- Running time: 59 minutes
- Country: Sweden
- Language: Swedish
- Budget: 8 million SEK

That Boy Emil (original: Emil & Ida i Lönneberga) is a Swedish animated film based on the Astrid Lindgren books of Emil i Lönneberga. It was released to cinemas in Sweden on 25 December 2013.

== Plot ==
Emil and his sister Ida live on a farm in Lönneberga. Emil does many pranks, but actually he doesn't want to make pranks, they just happen as Emil can't foresee the consequences of his actions. Often they are made with good intent. For example, Emil gets mouse traps to help his parents to get rid of mice. Instead of the mice his father is the one who gets caught. After Emil has committed a prank, his father usually locks him inside a shed. There Emil carves a wooden figure. Ida, however, is a good girl, as she wants to be locked into the shed herself in one episode, but cannot manage to anger her father.

== Reception ==
=== Critical response ===
The Berliner Morgenpost described the film as funny and colourful.

The Kinderfilmblog believes That Boy Emil is also suitable for a young audience, but conflicts are "limited to quite harmless skirmishes, there are no edges and flaws. Everything is nice, cheerful and doesn't really matter, the nicest scenes are solely owned to the qualities of Astrid Lindgrens books".
