= La Veniexiana (play) =

16th-century play written in Venetian

La Veniexiana ('The Venetian Woman') is a comedy play in five acts from around 1536, written in the Venetian language by an unknown author. It is titled The Venetian Comedy in English; and the Venetian title is often written with modernized spelling La Venexiana.

The play tells the story of Julio, a young man who arrives in Venice and falls in love with a young married woman.

The anonymous play was discovered by E. Lovarini in a Venetian book at the Biblioteca Nazionale Marciana in Venice, and published by him in 1928. It is believed to have been composed between 1535 and 1537. It has been attributed to the learned and lettered Girolamo Fracastoro of Verona (1478–1553), but this attribution is far from proved.

The comedy plays on the dialects of Tuscany, Venice and Bergamo. Julio, the educated foreigner, speaks Tuscan. The Venetian women (Anzòla and Valiera) and their maids speak Venetian, while the porter speaks Bergamasque.

The play was adapted in 1958 by Ingmar Bergman as the Swedish television drama The Venetian (Venetianskan), and in 1986 by Mauro Bolognini as the erotic movie The Venetian Woman (La Venexiana).
