= Allan Edwall =

Swedish actor (1924–1997)

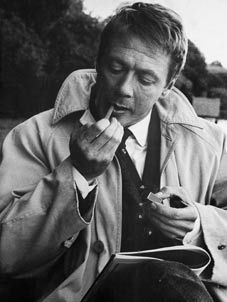
- Allan Edwall in 1965
- Born: Johan Allan Edwall; 25 August 1924; Rödön, Sweden
- Died: 7 February 1997 (aged 72); Stockholm, Sweden
- Occupations: Actor; Screenwriter; Film Director; Singer
- Years active: 1953–1997
- Spouse: Britt Edwall (m. 1957–1965)

Johan Allan Edwall (25 August 1924 – 7 February 1997) was a Swedish actor, director, author, composer and singer, best-known outside Sweden for the small roles he played in some of Ingmar Bergman's films, such as Fanny and Alexander (1982). He found his largest audience in the Scandinavian countries for playing lovable characters in several of the film and TV adaptations of the children's stories by Astrid Lindgren. He attended Stockholm's Royal Dramatic Training Academy from 1949 to 1952. During his long career he appeared in over 400 works. At the 10th Guldbagge Awards in 1974, he won the award for Best Actor for his role as Emil's short-tempered father Anton Svensson in Emil and the Piglet.

His 1984 film Åke and His World was entered into the 14th Moscow International Film Festival.

In his self-written songs, he frequently attacked the injustices of society. The music is similar to folk music often using violin and accordion. He won a Swedish Grammy posthumously in 2006.

Edwall also owned a theatre, Teater Brunnsgatan Fyra in Stockholm, which he bought in 1986 and operated until his death in 1997 of prostate cancer (it is now managed by Kristina Lugn’s daughter Martina Montelius). He was the father of photographer Mattias Edwall and stage director, actor and musician Måns Edwall (1960–2016). Acting colleague Erland Josephson wrote about him in Expressen after his death: "He was odd. But, damn it, he managed to be odd in a universal way!"

== Partial filmography ==
- Resan till dej (1953) - Composer (uncredited)
- Our Father and the Gypsy (1954) - Natan
- Dans på rosor (1954) - Olsson, journalist (uncredited)
- Wild Birds (1955) - Fiorentino
- Girls Without Rooms (1956) - Ulla's Husband (uncredited)
- No Tomorrow (1957) - Poet
- Körkarlen (1958) - Tramp
- Raggare! (1959) - Narrator (voice)
- The Virgin Spring (1960) - Beggar
- The Die Is Cast (1960) - Dag Serén
- Heart's Desire (1960) - Servant
- The Wedding Day (1960) - Vicar
- The Devil's Eye (1960) - The ear demon
- On a Bench in a Park (1960) - Man at Restaurant
- Lovely Is the Summer Night (1961) - Luffaren
- Briggen Tre Liljor (1961) - Simon Toking
- Kort är sommaren (1962) - Doctor
- Winter Light (1963) - Algot Frövik
- All These Women (1964) - Jillker
- 4x4 (1965) - Banvakten (segment "Uppehåll i myrlandet")
- My Home Is Copacabana (1965) - Narrator (voice)
- Festivitetssalongen (1965) - Lund - Doctor
- Hemsöborna (1966) – Carlsson
- Träfracken (1966) - Falk
- Här har du ditt liv (1966) - August
- Mördaren - en helt vanlig person (1967) - Wilhelmsson
- Människor möts och ljuv musik uppstår i hjärtat (1967) - Narrator (voice)
- Eriksson (1969) - Eriksson - Verkstadsarbetare
- Bokhandlaren som slutade bada (1969) - Jacob
- We Are All Demons (1969) - Tor, den syke matrosen
- Ministern (1970) - Lindbaum
- The Emigrants (1971) - Danjel
- Emil i Lönneberga (1971) - Anton, Emil's father
- The New Land (1972) - Danjel
- Nya hyss av Emil i Lönneberga (1972) - Anton, Emil's father
- Emil och griseknoen (1973) - Anton, Emil's father
- Elvis! Elvis! (1976) - Elvis' Grandfather
- Games of Love and Loneliness (1977) - Markel
- Måndagarna med Fanny (1977) - Driver
- The Brothers Lionheart (1977) - Mattias
- To Be a Millionaire (1980) - Kansliråd Allan Persson
- Sverige åt svenskarna (1980) - Doctor Karl Otto
- Madicken på Junibacken (1980) - Mr. Nilsson
- SOPOR (1981) - Thorbjörn Fälldin
- Tuppen (1981) - Thorsson, receptionist
- Rasmus på luffen (1981) - Oskar
- Fanny and Alexander (1982) - Oscar Ekdahl - Ekdahlska huset
- Limpan (1983) - Sture Charles 'Limpan' Lindberg
- P & B (1983) - Josef 'Stavros' Bendel
- Åke and His World (1984) - Principal Godeman
- Ronia, the Robber's Daughter (1984) - Skalle-Per
- The Sacrifice (1986) - Otto
- Mälarpirater (1987) - Frans i Flinta
- Resan till Melonia (1989) - Prospero (voice)

== Discography ==
- 1979: Grovdoppa
- 1981: Färdknäpp
- 1982: Gnällspik
- 1982: Ramsor om dom och oss
- 1984: Vetahuteri
- 1991: Edwalls blandning
- 2002: Den lilla bäcken - Allans bästa (posthumous)
- 2005: Aftonro (posthumous)
- 2005: Alla Allans visor (posthumous)
- 2005: Allans allra bästa (posthumous)

== Bibliography ==
- Protokoll (1954, novel)
- Ljuva läge (1967, novel)
- Engeln (1974, novel)
- Limpan (1977, novel)
- Mellan liv och död (1993, plays)
