= Åke and His World =

1984 film

- Directed by: Allan Edwall
- Written by: Allan Edwall; Bertil Malmberg
- Starring: Martin Lindström
- Cinematography: Jörgen Persson
- Release date: 29 October 1984
- Running time: 99 minutes
- Country: Sweden
- Language: Swedish

Åke and His World (Swedish: Åke och hans värld) is a 1984 Swedish drama film directed by Allan Edwall. It was entered into the 14th Moscow International Film Festival. The film was also selected as the Swedish entry for the Best Foreign Language Film at the 57th Academy Awards, but was not accepted as a nominee.

== Cast ==
- Martin Lindström as Åke
- Loa Falkman as Åke's father
- Gunnel Fred as Åke's mother
- Katja Blomquist as Åke's sister Aja
- Ulla Sjöblom as Åke's grandmother
- Suzanne Ernrup as Anne-Marie
- Björn Gustafson as Bergström
- Alexander Skarsgård as Kalle Nubb
- Stellan Skarsgård as Ebenholtz
- Allan Edwall as Principal Godeman

== See also ==
- List of submissions to the 57th Academy Awards for Best Foreign Language Film
- List of Swedish submissions for the Academy Award for Best Foreign Language Film
