= The Emperor of Lies =

2009 novel by Steve Sem-Sandberg

- First edition
- Author: Steve Sem-Sandberg
- Original title: De fattiga i Łódź
- Language: Swedish
- Published: 2009
- Publisher: Albert Bonniers Förlag
- Publication place: Sweden
- Awards: August Prize of 2009

The Emperor of Lies (Swedish: De fattiga i Łódź, lit. 'The Poor in Łódź') is a 2009 novel by Swedish author Steve Sem-Sandberg. It received positive reviews from critics and won the August Prize in 2009. The book has so far been translated into 25 languages worldwide and has become a bestseller in many countries. A new Swedish edition, in large pocket format, was published in December 2020.
