= Kristina Lugn =

Swedish poet (1948–2020)

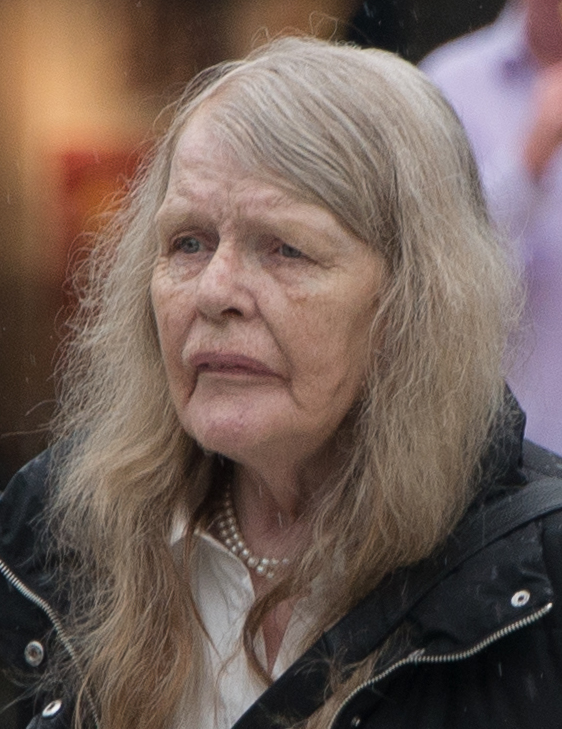
- Born: Gunhild Bricken Kristina Lugn; 14 November 1948; Tierp, Sweden
- Died: 9 May 2020 (aged 71); Stockholm, Sweden
- Occupations: Poet; dramatist
- Spouse: Mons Montelius
- Children: Martina Montelius
- Relatives: Robert Lugn (father)
- Writing career
- Language: Swedish

Member of the Swedish Academy (Seat No. 14)
- In office 20 December 2006 – 9 May 2020
- Preceded by: Lars Gyllensten
- Succeeded by: Steve Sem-Sandberg

Gunhild Bricken Kristina Lugn (Swedish: [krɪsˈtîːna ˈlɵŋːn]; 14 November 1948 – 9 May 2020) was a Swedish poet and dramatist and member of the Swedish Academy.

== Early life ==
Kristina Lugn was born in Tierp and grew up in Skövde where her father, Major-General Robert Lugn, served in the Skaraborg Armoured Regiment, and her mother, Brita-Stina, was a lecturer.

== Career ==
Kristina Lugn published eight collections of poems from 1972 with her debut Om jag inte. She also wrote drama and appeared in other media, for instance hosting the show Oförutsett which was broadcast on SVT in 1987. She hosted the show together with Jörn Donner and Bert Karlsson.

After the death of actor Allan Edwall in 1997, Lugn assumed the leadership of his small independent theatre Teater Brunnsgatan Fyra in Stockholm, where she also staged several of her own plays. She was art director for the theatre until 2011. Much appreciated by the Swedish audience, she touched on subjects such as loneliness, death and mid-life crises with irony, cynicism and black humour. After 2011 it was run by her daughter, the author Martina Montelius.

Some of her poetry has been translated into Serbian by Eleonora Luthander. Several of her plays have also been performed at Stockholm's Royal Dramatic Theatre, including Tant Blomma, Idlaflickorna, Titta en älg! and Kvinnorna vid Svansjön. In 2002, Lugn hosted her own live talkshow for guests at Teater Brunnsgatan called Seg kväll med Lugn.

Together with author Henning Mankell, Kristina Lugn wrote the novel Tjuvbadarna.

== Awards, distinctions, and music ==
On 20 December 2006, Lugn was elected into the Swedish Academy to replace Lars Gyllensten in chair 14.

She won awards including the Dobloug Prize in 1999, the Selma Lagerlöf literature prize in 1999, the Bellman prize in 2002, the Gustaf Fröding Society's lyrics prize in 2007, and the Övralids prize in 2009.

During the wedding of Crown Princess Victoria and Daniel Westling on 19 June 2010, a newly composed piece of music called "Vilar glad. I din famn", composed by Lugn was performed.

Several known Swedish composers have worked with Lugn's poems including Gabriel Wilczkowski, Bo Ullman, Sven-David Sandström, Kim Hedås and Peter Gullin.

On 8 June 2014, Lugn was awarded the Karamelodiktstipendiet.

== Death ==
Lugn was found dead in her home on 9 May 2020; the cause of death has not been released.

== Selected bibliography ==
- Om jag inte (If I Not) 1972
- Till min man, om han kunde läsa (To My Husband, If He Could Read) 1976
- Döda honom! (Kill Him!) 1978
- Om ni hör ett skott (If You Hear A Gun Shot) 1979
- Percy Wennerfors 1982
- Bekantskap önskas med äldre bildad herre (Looking For Acquaintance With Educated Older Gentleman) 1983
- Lugn bara Lugn (Lugn Just Lugn) 1984
- Hundstunden (The Dog Hour) 1989
- Samlat lugn (Collected Lugn) 1997
- Nattorienterarna (The Night Orienteers) 1999
- Hej då, ha det så bra (Good Bye, Have A Great Time) 2003

== Selected plays ==
- När det utbröt panik i det kollektiva omedvetna (When Panic Broke Out in the Collective Unconscious) 1986
- Titta det blöder (Look It's Bleeding) 1987
- Det vackra blir liksom över (The Beautiful Things Is Kind Of Left Out; American title, "The Hour of the Dog"; performed in New York and Edinburgh) 1989
- Tant Blomma (Aunt Flower; American title, "Aunt Blossom"; performed in New York) 1993
- Idlaflickorna (The Idla Girls) (American title, "The Old Girls at Lake Garda"; performed in New York) 1993
- Silver Star (performed in New York) 1995
- De tröstlösa (The Inconsolable) 1997 (written with Allan Edwall)
- Titta en älg (Look A Moose) 1999
- Stulna juveler (Stolen Jewels; performed in New York) 2000
- Eskil Johnassons flyttfirma (Eskil Johnasson's Mover Business) 2000
- Begåvningsreserven (The Talent Reserve) 2002
- Kvinnorna vid Svansjön (The Women by The Swan Lake) 2003
- Två solstrålar på nya äventyr (Two Sunbeams On New Adventures) 2003
- Var är Holger, Harald och Herrman? (Where Are Holger, Harald and Herrman?) 2004
- Vera 2005
- Det finns ett liv därborta i Vällingby (There Is A Life Over There at Vällingby) 2005
- Gråt inte mer, Cecilia. Och inte du heller, Ursula (Don't Cry Anymore, Cecilia. And Not You Either, Ursula) 2005
- Katarina den stora (Catherine The Great) 2006
- Hjälp sökes (Help Sought) 2013
- Hej, det är jag igen (Hi, It's Me Again) 2014

Cultural offices
| Preceded by Lars Gyllensten | Swedish Academy, Seat No.14; 2006–2020 | Succeeded by Steve Sem-Sandberg |
