= Eleonora Luthander =

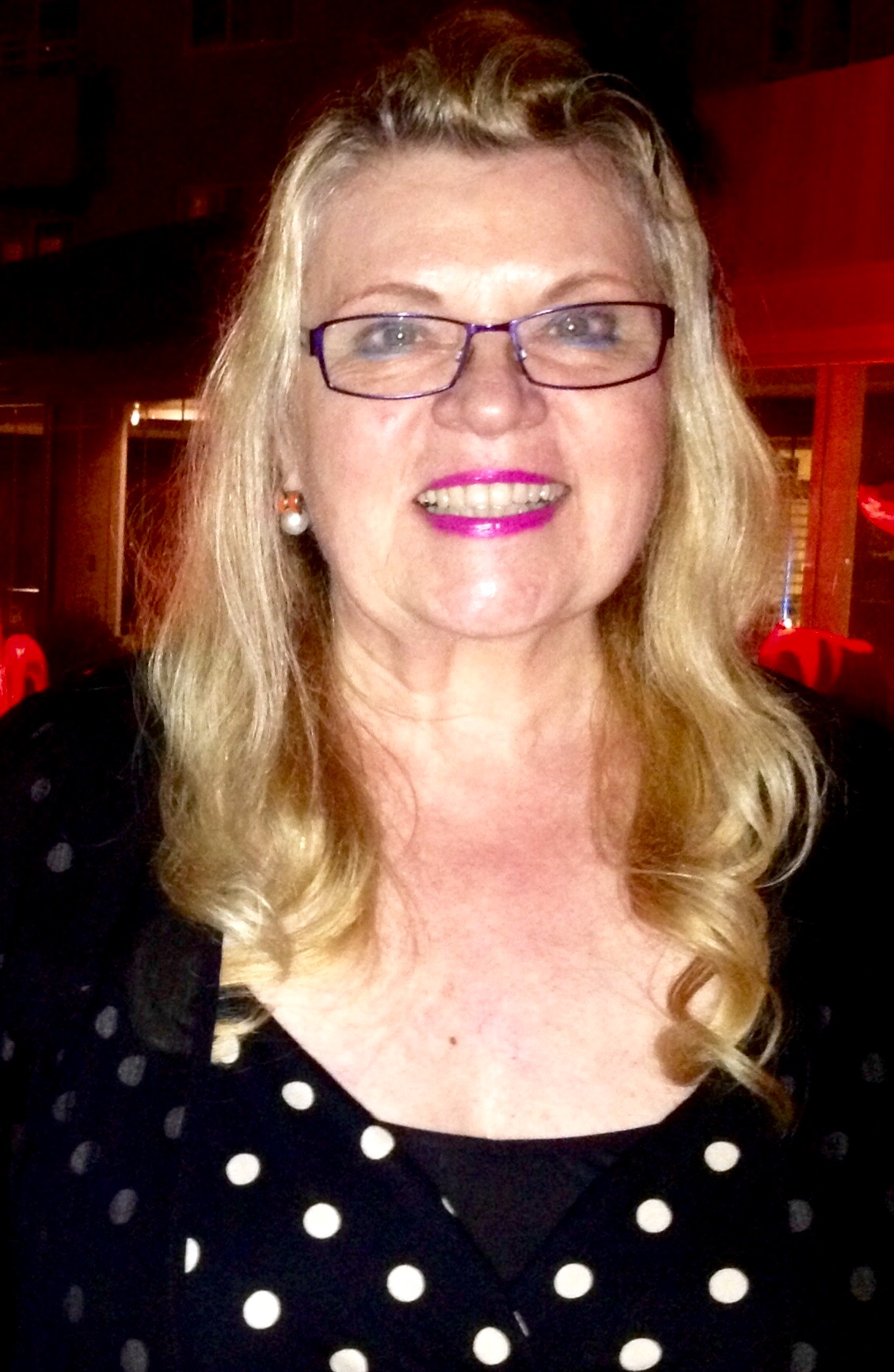
- Genre: poetry and translation
- Notable works: Diktogram; Vägen till Gdinj

Eleonora Luthander (née Damjanović; 9 February 1954 - 25 August 2021), born in Kruševac, Yugoslavia, was a Swedish and Serbian poet, columnist and translator.

== Biography ==
Luthander studied at the Faculty of Economics in Belgrade. Between 1986 and 1994 she lived on the Adriatic island of Hvar in Croatia where she made her debut as a writer in 1993 with the book Žvončići sreće.

She has published over 30 books and translations partly through her Swedish book publisher Ord & Visor. She has translated contemporary Swedish poets in Serbian; Kristina Lugn, Bruno K. Öijer, Lukas Moodysson and Ulf Lundell and haiku poetry from Dag Hammarskjöld. Her poetry collections Diktogram and Vägen till Gdinj (Road to Gdinj) are listed in the Swedish Academy's Nobel Library.

Luthander was a member of the Swedish Writers Association and the Swedish Immigrant Writers Association, later renamed the Swedish International Writers Association. She worked as a columnist for the magazine Sesam Öppnar Dörrar.

She often participated in poetry slam competitions in Sweden, both as a contestant and as an organizer. Luthander often drew inspiration from Japan; several of her published works are Japanese short poems, haiku. Luthander folded origami flowers and wrote her poems on stalks. She brought haiku, origami and ikebana together into her own Orikebana.

She was married to the Swedish journalist Per Luthander between 1975 and 1986. She has a daughter and a son, they both live in Stockholm.

== Style ==
Her poems are often described with sense of joy and energy. The poetry is straightforward and unadorned as stylistic for poets such as Märta Tikkanen, Kristina Lugn and Bodil Malmsten. Luthander's poems are unsentimental and the imagery is original and sometimes drastic.

== Bibliography ==
=== Collection of poems in Swedish ===
- 1998 - Vägen till Gdinj
- 1999 - Angantyr, ISBN 9188674819
- 2000 - Måncykel, ISBN 9188675238
- 2002 - 100% kärlek, ISBN 9189424611
- 2003 - Öfvre Östermalm, ISBN 9188675823
- 2005 - 33 blommor för Sandjusangendo, ISBN 9189424778
- 2007 - Diktogram, ISBN 9789185515257
- 2010 - Kranvatten, ISBN 9789186621056
- 2014 - Dubai haiku, diktsamling, ISBN 9789163749735
- 2017 - Orikebana, ISBN 9789163948251
- 2020 - Klimat haiku, ISBN 9789151943510
- 2021 - Ökenhörna, ISBN 9789188965455

=== Collection of poems in other languages ===
Croatian, Serbian & Montenegrin

- 1993 - Žvončići sreće, Split
- 1994 - Put u Gdinj, Split
- 2005 - Minut ćutanja, Belgrade, ISBN 8673430518
- 2005 - Hvarska prigovaranja, Belgrade, ISBN 8673430682
- 2006 - Ikebana, haiku, Belgrade, ISBN 8686335063
- 2006 - Mojim ustima, Belgrade, ISBN 867634079X
- 2008 - Kapital, Stockholm, ISBN 9789163322945
- 2009 - Medovina, Podgorica, ISBN 9788685817427
- 2011 - Česmovača, Stockholm
- 2012 - Cmokva, Podgorica
- 2015 - Ela Čevska, Podgorica, ISBN 9789163948268
- 2019 - Haiku bento, Stockholm

== Translations ==
=== From Swedish to Serbo-Croatian ===
- 2005 - Dovidjenja i srećno! (Hej då ha det så bra!), Kristina Lugn, Belgrade
- 2006 - Izgubljena reč, (Det Förlorade Ordet), Bruno K. Öijer, Belgrade
- 2006 - Izmedju 16 i 26, (Mellan sexton och tjugosex), Lukas Moodysson, Belgrade
- 2007 - Vreme za ljubav, (Tid för kärlek), Ulf Lundell, Belgrade
- 2009 - Vrijeme za ljubav (Tid för kärlek), Ulf Lundell, "UKCG", Podgorica
- 2013 - Bergman i žene (Bergman och kvinnor), Alexandra Luthander, Stockholm

=== From Serbo-Croatian to Swedish ===
- 2005 - Ögat är större än himmelen, serbiska poeter jag har mött (Oko je prostranije od neba, srpski pesnici koje sam upoznala), e book, "Serum.se", Stockholm
- 2005 - Ögat är större än himmelen, (Poeziju će svi pisati), "Gatos", Belgrade
- 2007 - Alla skall skriva poesi 2, (Poeziju će svi pisati 2), Stockholm
- 2008 - Alla skall skriva poesi 3, (Poeziju će svi pisati 3), Stockholm
- 2008 - Alla skall skriva poesi: serbiska poeter jag mött, (Poeziju će svi pisati: srpski pesnici koje sam upoznala), e book, "Serum.se", Stockholm
- 2010 - Brev från Serbien (Pisma iz Srbije), Slobodan Branković, Stockholm
