= Oscar Hedstrom =

American motorcycle designer (1871–1960)

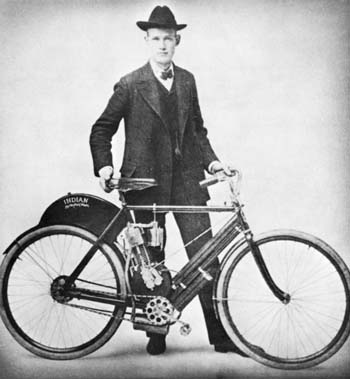
- Hedstrom with his first Indian prototype in 1901
- Born: Carl Oscar Hedström; March 12, 1871; Åkarp, Småland, Sweden
- Died: August 29, 1960 (aged 89); Portland, Connecticut, U.S.
- Occupation: Motorcycle designer
- Spouse: Julia Anderson (11 April 1898 – until his death)
- Children: Helen, born 10 May 1901
- Parent(s): Anders Petter Hedström; Carolina Danielsdotter

Carl Oscar Hedstrom (March 12, 1871 – August 29, 1960) was a Swedish-born American motorcycle designer who co-founded the Indian Motocycle Manufacturing Company.

== Early life ==
Hedström was born in the parish of Lönneberga, Hultsfred Municipality, Kalmar County, Småland, Sweden. His family emigrated to the United States in 1880 and settled in Brooklyn, New York City. As a boy, he spent much time riding a bicycle around the city, and was fascinated by its mechanical design.

== Career ==
At age 16, Hedstrom started working at a small engineering workshop in the Bronx, New York, where he learned to manufacture watch cases and components. He worked as an apprentice in several small workshops, until he was 21 when he obtained journeyman status.

== On two wheels ==
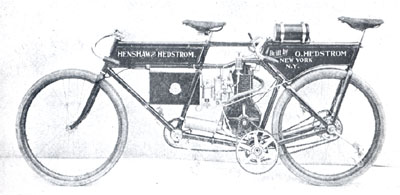
Hedstrom's Tandem Pacer

In his spare time Hedstrom built high-quality bicycles that were lighter and more durable than standard bikes. He rented a workshop space in Middletown, Connecticut where he designed and cast engines from his own patterns. He also designed and build a concentric carburetor. While his reputation as a bicycle designer grew, he started to build tandem bicycles with gasoline engines. These were called pacers, and were used to split the wind for racing cyclists. The motorized pacers of that time functioned poorly, but Hedstrom's design quickly gained a reputation as being very reliable.

At this time he came into contact with the former cyclist George M Hendee from Springfield, Massachusetts, who now manufactured bicycles and sponsored contests. Hendee was dissatisfied with the pacers available, and asked Hedstrom to take one of his to Springfield. Hendee was so impressed that he asked Hedstrom to develop a prototype for a mass-manufactured motorized bicycle.

The first Indian prototype was then built and completed on May 25, 1901, by Hedström at the old Worcester Cycle Manufacturing Company in Middletown, Connecticut, and the first public demonstration was held on Cross Street in Springfield, Massachusetts at 12:00 noon on Saturday June 1, 1901.

== Indian Motocycle Company ==
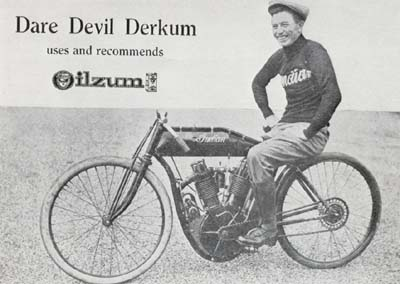
Paul Derkum on an Indian designed by Hedström 1912

The cooperation between Hedstrom and Hendee resulted in the Indian Motocycle Company. Hedstrom's design was innovative, and successful. Oscar Hedstrom resigned from the Indian Motocycle Company on 24 March 1913 after a disagreement with the board regarding dubious practices to inflate the company's stock values. George Hendee resigned in 1916. Hedstrom resided on his estate on the banks of the Connecticut River until he died in 1960.
