= Lars Gyllensten =

Swedish author and physician

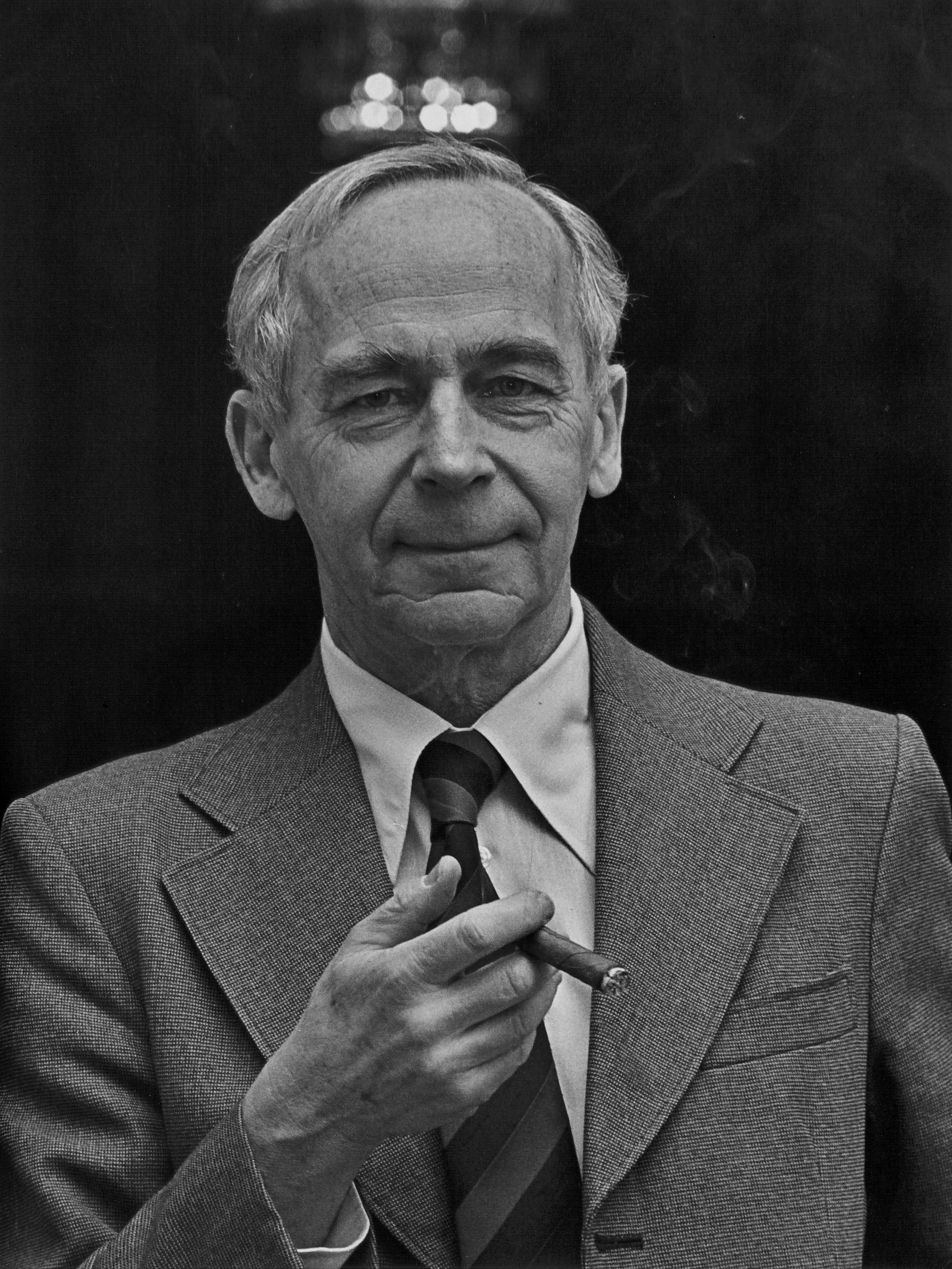
- Lars Gyllensten, 1986
- Born: Lars Johan Wictor Gyllensten; 12 November 1921; Stockholm, Sweden
- Died: 25 May 2006 (aged 84); Stockholm, Sweden
- Resting place: Norra begravningsplatsen
- Occupations: author, physician
- Writing career
- Language: Swedish

Member of the Swedish Academy (Seat No. 14)
- In office 20 December 1966 – 26 May 2006
- Preceded by: Ragnar Josephson
- Succeeded by: Kristina Lugn

Permanent Secretary of the Swedish Academy
- In office May 1977 – June 1986
- Preceded by: Karl Ragnar Gierow
- Succeeded by: Sture Allén

Lars Johan Wictor Gyllensten (12 November 1921 – 25 May 2006) was a Swedish author and physician, and a member of the Swedish Academy.

Gyllensten was born and grew up in a middle-class family in Stockholm, son of Carl Gyllensten and Ingrid Rangström, and nephew of Ture Rangström. He studied at the Karolinska Institute, becoming a doctor of medicine in 1953, and was an associate professor of histology there from 1955 to 1973.

His first written work, published under the pseudonym Jan Wictor in 1946, was a collection of poetry by Gyllensten and Torgny Greitz entitled Camera Obscura, a straight-faced parody of Swedish modernist 1940s poetry. The Swedish Academy biography refers to his "dialectic" prose trilogy Moderna myter ('Modern myths', 1949), Det blå skeppet ('The blue ship', 1950) and Barnabok ('Child book', 1952) as the "real" beginning of his authorship. His last work was published in 2004. He left the Karolinska Institute to become a full-time author in 1973. He has been described as a Swedish counterpart to Thomas Mann and Albert Camus. Few of his works have been translated into English, French and German.

He became a member of the Swedish Academy in 1966, was permanent secretary of the Academy from 1977 to 1986, served on the Swedish Academy's Nobel Prize committee from 1968 to 1987, became a member of the Nobel Foundation in 1979 (serving as chairman from 1987 to 1993), and was an honorary member of the Royal Swedish Academy of Letters, History and Antiquities.

Gyllensten left the Swedish Academy in 1989 as a result of its failure to support Salman Rushdie following the fatwa calling for Rushdie's death because of his controversial novel The Satanic Verses. According to the rules of the Academy, Gyllensten remained a passive member for the remainder of his life.

== Notes ==
Cultural offices
Preceded by Ragnar Josephson	Swedish Academy, Seat No.14; 1966–2006	Succeeded by Kristina Lugn
Non-profit organization positions
Preceded by Sune Bergström	Chairman of the Nobel Foundation; 1987–1993	Succeeded by Bengt Samuelsson
