= Teater Brunnsgatan Fyra =

Coordinates: 59°20′12.36″N 18°4′11.6″E

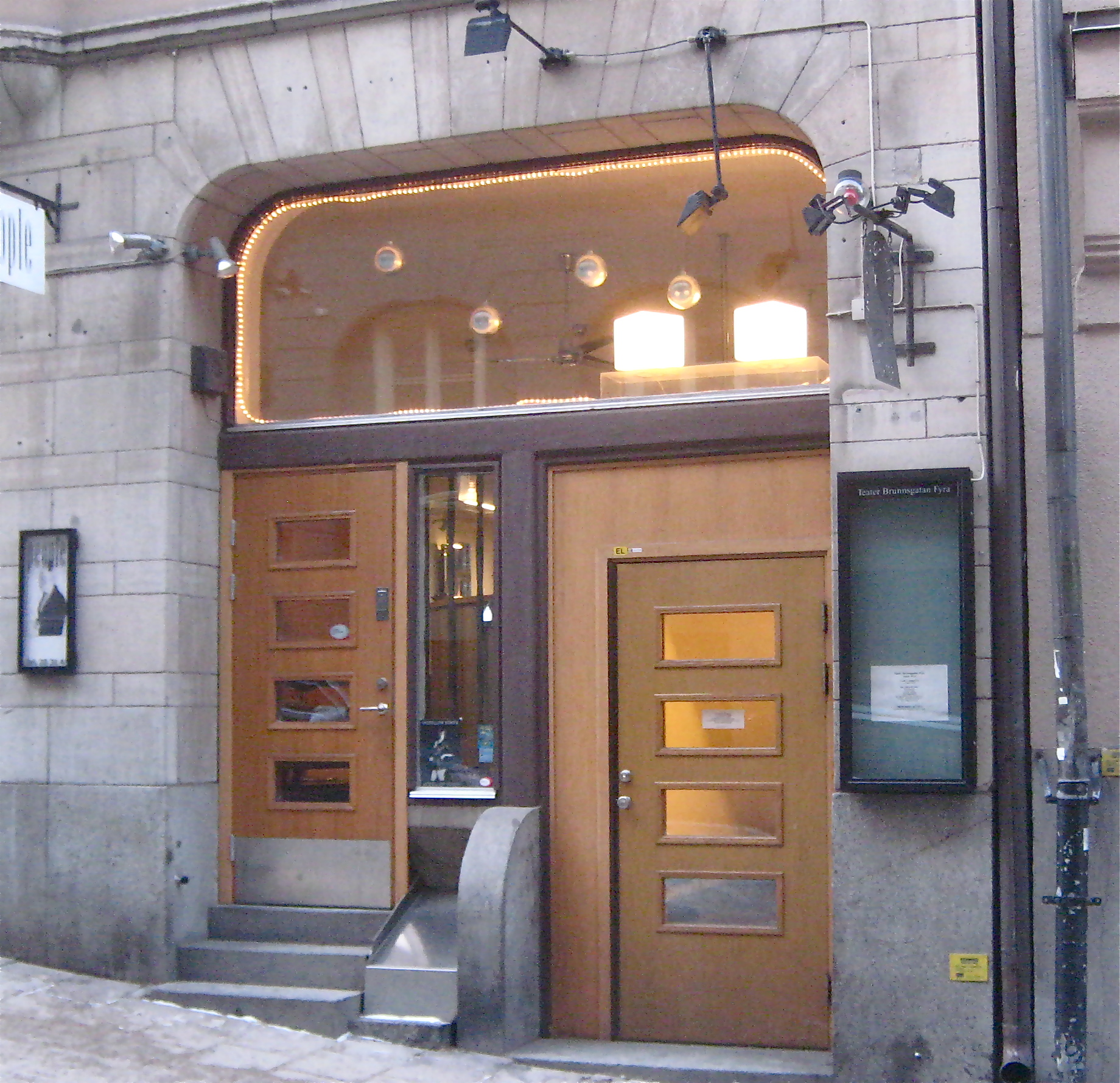

Teater Brunnsgatan Fyra, named after its address, Brunnsgatan 4, is a small theatre in Stockholm for contemporary Swedish dramatic work.

It was founded by the actor and playwright Allan Edwall. After his death in 1997, it was managed by the poet and playwright Kristina Lugn until 2011, when Lugn's daughter Martina Montelius took over.

The stage is small and intimate, and the theatre seats only around 100 people.
