= Steve Sem-Sandberg =

Swedish journalist, novelist, non-fiction writer and translator (born 1958)

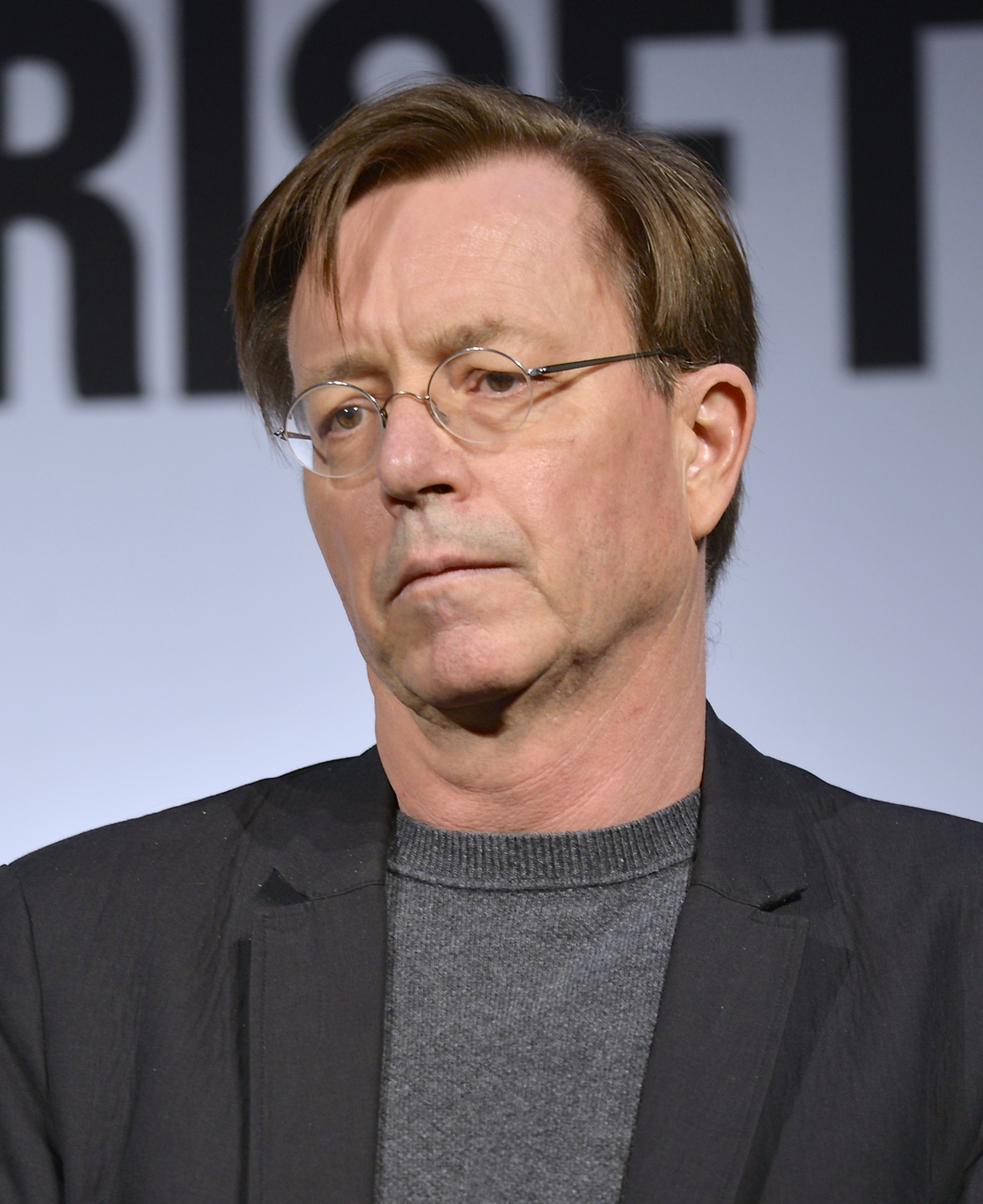
- Sem-Sandberg in October 2014
- Born: Snorre Steve Sem-Sandberg; 1958 (age 67–68); Oslo, Norway
- Writing career
- Period: 1976–present
- Notable works: Theres (1996); Allt förgängligt är bara en bild (1999); Ravensbrück (2003); Härifrån till Allmänningen (2005); The Emperor of Lies (2011)

Member of the Swedish Academy (Seat No. 14)
- Incumbent
- Assumed office 15 April 2021
- Preceded by: Kristina Lugn

Steve Sem-Sandberg (born 1958) is a Swedish journalist, novelist, non-fiction writer, and translator. He made his literary debut in 1976 with the two science fiction novels Sländornas värld and Sökare i dödsskuggan. He was awarded the Dobloug Prize for fiction in 2005.

He was born in 1958 in Oslo but grew up in Stockholm. He worked at Svenska Dagbladet from 1988 to 2008.

His 2009 novel, The Emperor of Lies, was awarded the August Prize. It recounts the life of the Łódź Ghetto and its leader Chaim Rumkowski in Nazi-occupied Poland during World War II.

Daphne Merkin in The New York Times said that he had succeeded in writing "a freshly felt, fully absorbing novel about the Holocaust," an even more difficult task as he was writing about a known historical figure in Rumkowski. By combining both intimate views and overall history, he conveys an effect "both super-realist and surrealist, in the manner of an animated documentary."

== Awards and honours ==
- 1996 Aftonbladet's literary prize
- 2005 Dobloug Prize
- 2007 Premiul Marin Sorescu (first ever winner of the award)
- 2008 Karl Vennbergs pris
- 2009 August Prize
- 2010 Kerstin M Lundberg-priset
- 2013 Jan Michalski Prize for Literature, shortlist, The Emperor of Lies
- 2014 Bonnier Scholarship Fund for Writers
- 2016 Prix Médicis etranger, winner, Les élus
- 2016 Gerard Bonniers pris, Swedish Academy
- 2018 Natur & kultur's special grant for good literary achievements
- 2020 Eyvind Johnsonpriset for W. A novel
- 2021 Delblancpriset
- 2024 Selma Lagerlöf Prize

== Works ==
- Sländornas värld and Sökare i dödsskuggan, novels (1976)
- De ansiktslösa, novel (1987)
- I en annan del av staden, essays (1990)
- Den kluvna spegeln, reportage (1991)
- En lektion i pardans, novel (1993)
- Theres, novel (1996)
- "Allt förgängligt är bara en bild", novel (1999)
- Prag (no exit), essays (2002)
- Ravensbrück, novel (2003)
- Härifrån till Allmänningen, novel (2005)
- De fattiga i Łódź, novel (2009) (English: The Emperor of Lies, 2011)
- Tre romaner, omnibus (2011)
- De utvalda, novel (2014) (English: The Chosen Ones, 2016)
- Stormen, novel (2016) (English: The Tempest, 2019)
- W, novel (2019) (English: W. A novel, 2022)
- Jägarna i Armentières, short stories (2020)
- The Ocean, novel (2022)
- De heligas stad (2025)

Cultural offices
Preceded by Kristina Lugn	Swedish Academy, Seat No.14; 2020–	Incumbent
