= Back to Earth (Caligola album) =

Studio album by Caligola
- Released: 2 March 2012
- Genre: Electronic, Pop, Rock
- Label: Universal Music

Back To Earth is the first studio album by Swedish project Caligola.

== Track listing ==
Listed tracks are:

No.	Title	Length
1.	"Back 2 Earth"	0:59
2.	"Down By The Riverside"	2:45
3.	"Forgive Forget"	2:52
4.	"Fire Burns Out A Weak Heart"	0:55
5.	"Violettas Dance"	4:19
6.	"Sting Of Battle"	4:09
7.	"Morning Light"	4:45
8.	"Raise Your Head"	4:14
9.	"My Sister Rising"	4:08
10.	"Capo"	1:51
11.	"Sad Girl"	3:41
12.	"Ride The Night Away"	3:02
13.	"Mr. Morris"	4:31
14.	"Angel Ice"	3:50
15.	"Hapokalypse"	3:12
