= Spyken =

Upper secondary school in Lund, Sweden

Gymnasieskolan Spyken
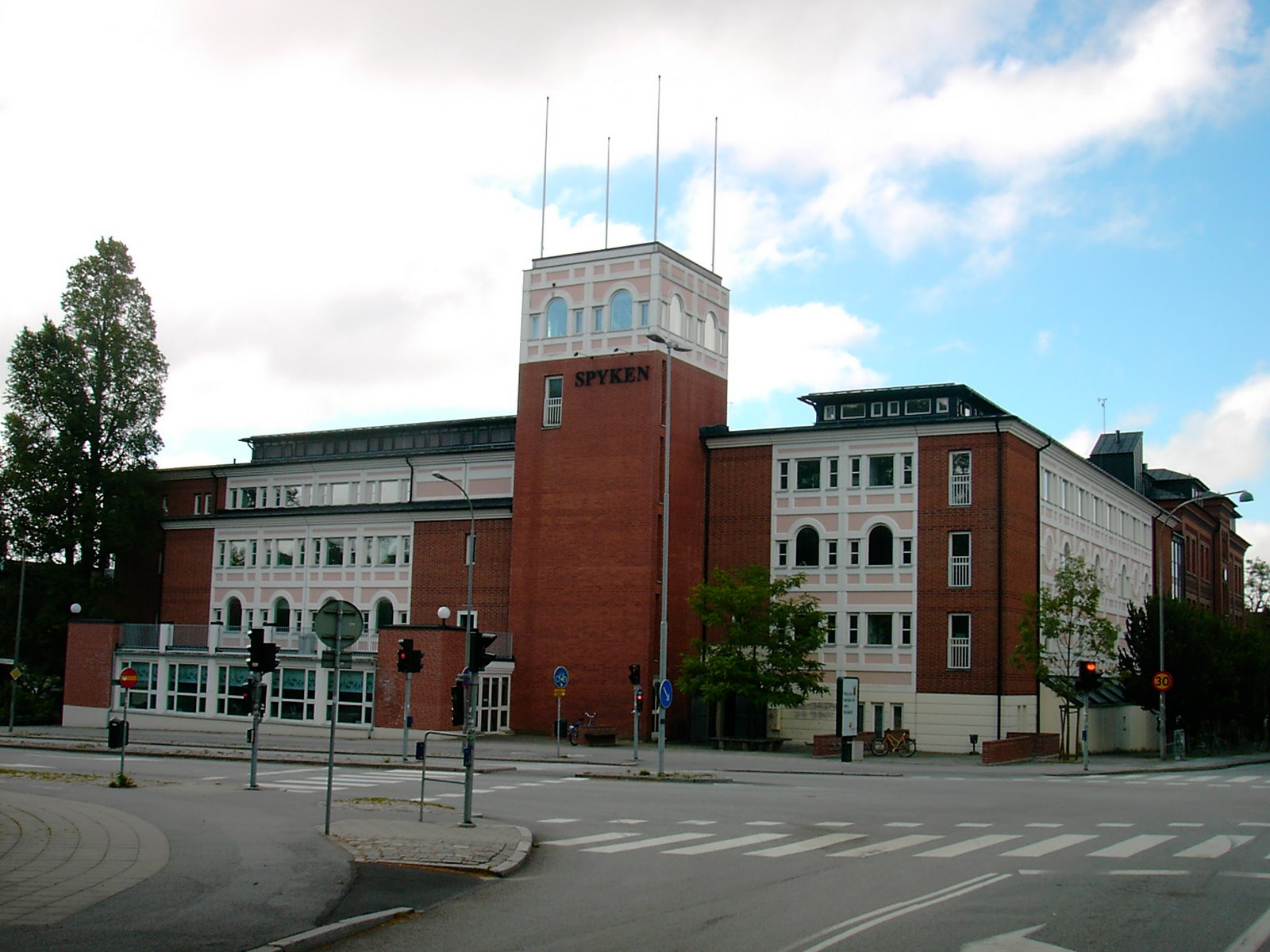
- Spyken building in 2009

Location
- Lund, Sweden; Sweden
- Coordinates: 55°42′4″N 13°12′3″E

Information
- Type: Public
- Established: 1848
- School district: Lund
- President: Petra Karlsson
- Principal: Natural sciences (NA): Maria Hedelin Social sciences programme (SA): Johan Ahx Aesthetics programme (ES) / Humanitarian programme (HU): Set Rooke
- Staff: 45
- Faculty: 75
- Grades: 10–12
- Enrollment: 1100

Spyken is an upper secondary school (gymnasieskola) in Lund, Sweden. The students are sometimes referred to as spykister (spykists).

== History ==
The school was founded in 1848 as Realskolan and had a capacity of 15 students. The number of students increased gradually up to 50. In 1869 the school changed its name to Lunds privata elementarskola (Lund private elementary school). In 1898 Johannes Strömberg became principal and during his time, the capacity of the school expanded greatly with new rooms, allowing more than 750 students. In 1968, the school was turned into a public school and changed its name again to Strömbergsgymnasiet after the former principal. The latest name change occurred in 1986, this time to its current name: Spyken. In this year, the school also had an addition of three annexes, the C-, D- and E-houses.

== The name ==
There are different theories of where the name (which is gibberish in Swedish) comes from. One is that a teacher always accidentally called psychology spychology. Another is that it was a nickname for a former principal. It is possible that it is a combination of both. The school was called Spyken for a long time in popular parlance before it became the official name.

== Today ==
Today, roughly 1,100 students attend the school, which has 120 employees.

== Spyxet ==
Every year, the students of Spyken arrange a Spex, called Spyxet. A list of recent Spyx'

- 2026 Bröderna Wright: Planen om planet
- 2025 Robin Hood: Hoppsan vilken dag
- 2024 Kleopatra: Fy Farao!
- 2023 Sankta Lucia: Skänk mig en tia
- 2022 Jeanne d'Arc: kvinna eller brinna?
- 2021 Huvudsaken är Huvudsaken
- 2020 Waterloo - Slaget om Schlagern
- 2019 Christofer Columbus - Vi sitter alla i samma båt
- 2018 Ett skepp kommer lastat
- 2017 Lösningarnas tidsålder – är du stressad?
- 2016 Den Siste Tsaren
- 2015 Bloody Mary
- 2014 Kalabaliken i Bender
- 2013 Jack Rackham
- 2012 Olympiaden
- 2011 Ramses II
- 2010 Marco Polo – en helt otecknad föreställning
- 2009 Exposition Universelle
- 2008 Anno Femtonhundranågonting
- 2007 Wienkongressen – Skarpt Läge!
- 2006 The Rat Pack
- 2005 Gustaf Dalén
- 2004 Spektaklet i Paris
- 2003 Anno 1189
- 2002 Alla vägar bär till Rom
- 2001 Karl den tolftes trevnad
- 2000 Slaget om sundet
- 1999 Don Quijote
- 1998 Förmodligen Freud
- 1997 Anno 1789
- 1996 I skuggan av Lucky Luke
- 1995 Astrid 100 år
- 1994 Jätten Finn
- 1993 Inget spyx
