= Jan Ohlsson =

Swedish actor

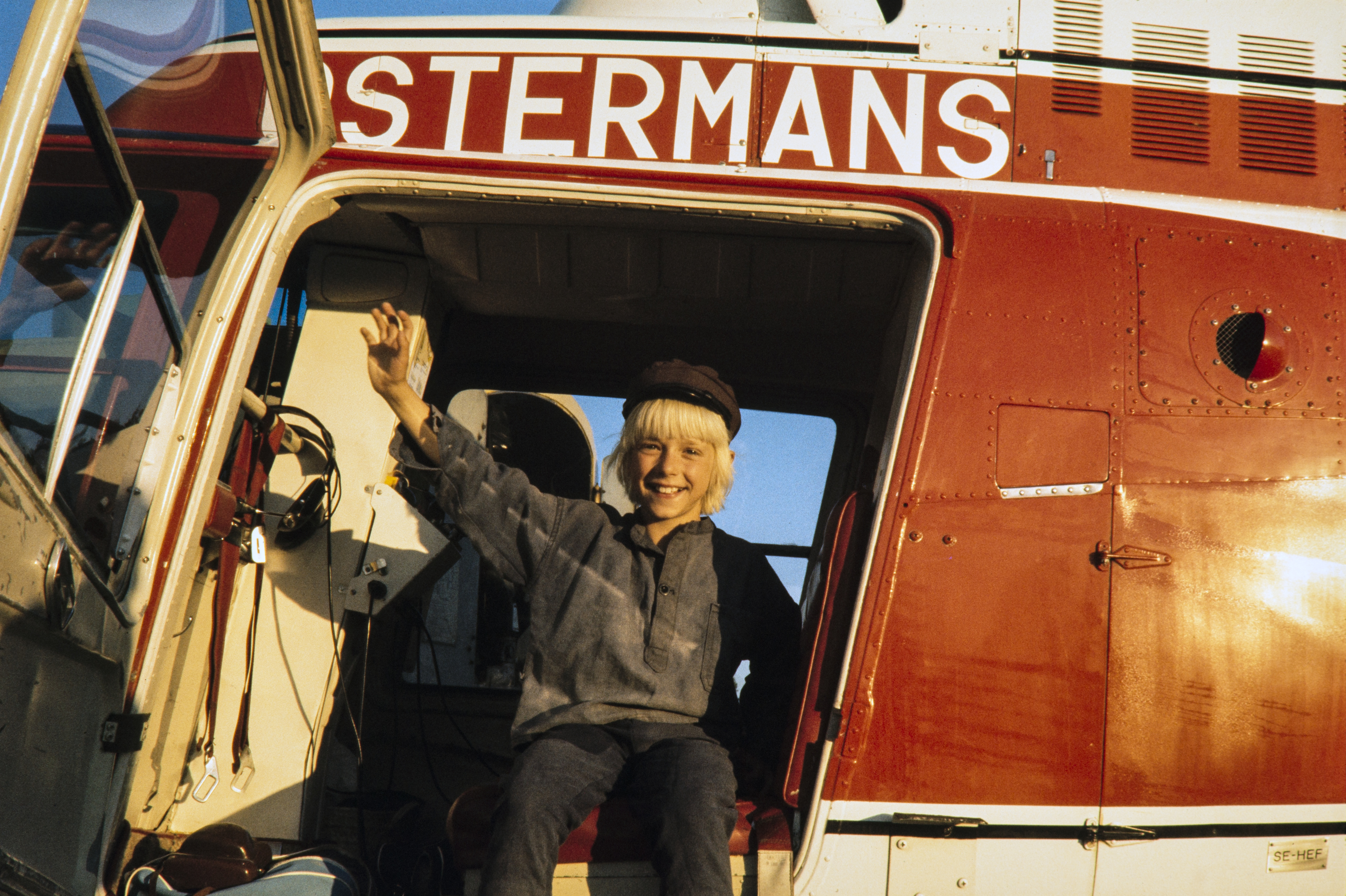
Photograph of the Swedish child star Jan Ohlsson (1962–), known for his role in the Swedish TV series Emil i Lönneberga, visiting Ekenäs (Tammisaari), Finland in a helicopter.

Jan Ohlsson (full name Jan Torsten Olsson, born 3 June 1962 in Uppsala) is a Swedish former child actor. He is well known for his role as Emil in Emil i Lönneberga, Nya hyss av Emil i Lönneberga and Emil och griseknoen. Now he works as a computer engineer.

== Bibliography ==
- Holmstrom, John. The Moving Picture Boy: An International Encyclopaedia from 1895 to 1995. Norwich, Michael Russell, 1996, p. 340.
