= Gerhard Hoberstorfer =

Swedish actor, singer and dancer (born 1963)

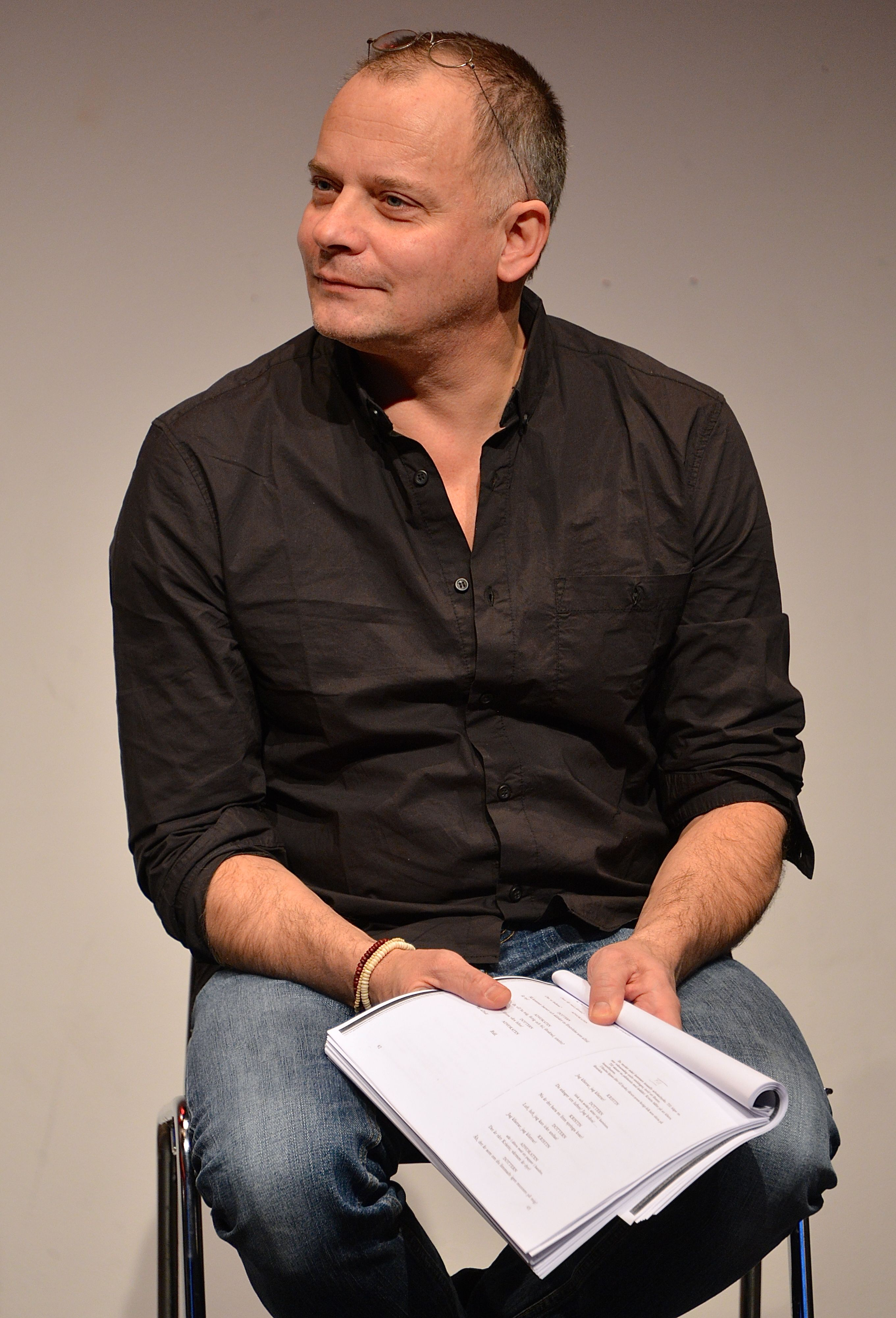
- Hoberstorfer in 2013
- Born: 18 November 1963 (age 62); Kungsholmen, Sweden
- Occupation: Actor

Per Gerhard Hoberstorfer (born 18 November 1963) is a Swedish actor, singer and dancer.

Hoberstorfer grew up in Boliden and Järfälla and studied at the School of Dance and Circus in Stockholm, and Teaterhögskolan in Malmö. He sings in the band Bad Liver. He got his breakthrough in 1989 as an actor in the TV-series Flickan vid stenbänken. Hoberstorfer has worked at the Stockholm City Theatre since 1999. There, he has acted in plays like Ett drömspel, Hair, Tre systrar, Hamlet, Idioten, Fröken Julie, En midsommarnattsdröm, and Hedda Gabler.

Hoberstorfer is the brother of TV-producer Kristian Hoberstorfer. He is in a relationship with Marietta von Hausswolff von Baumgarten, with whom he has two sons. He also has a daughter from another relationship.
