= Maud Hansson =

Swedish actress (1937–2020)

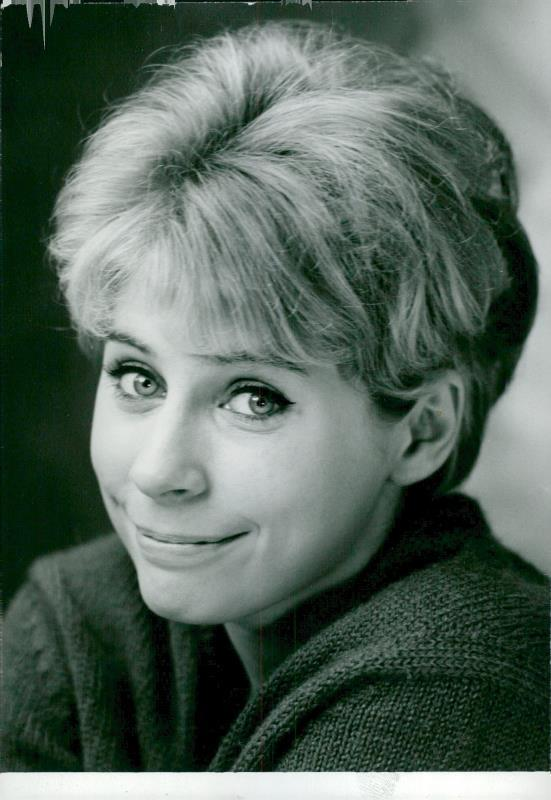
- Born: 5 December 1937; Stockholm, Sweden
- Died: 1 October 2020 (aged 82)
- Occupation: Actress
- Years active: 1956–1991
- Spouse: Petros Fyssoun (m. 1965; died 2016)

Maud Hansson (5 December 1937 – 1 October 2020) was a Swedish film actress. She appeared in 20 films between 1956 and 1991. Her filmography includes supporting roles in the Ingmar Bergman films The Seventh Seal and Wild Strawberries (both 1957) as well as her portrayal of the slightly naive maid Lina in the Emil of Lönneberga films (1971–1973) based on Astrid Lindgren's books.

She married Greek-Russian actor Petros Fyssoun in 1965; he died in 2016. She appeared in the television series Goda grannar. Her last screen role was in the 1991 television film Basaren. She died on 1 October 2020.

== Selected filmography ==
| Year | Title | Role | Notes |
|---|---|---|---|
| 1956 | Tarps Elin | Ingrid, age 14 | |
| 1957 | The Seventh Seal | Witch | |
| 1957 | Wild Strawberries | Angelica Borg | |
| 1958 | The Venetian | Nena, hennes tjänsteflicka | TV film |
| 1961 | Karneval | Lena | |
| 1963 | En vacker dag | Cornelia | |
| 1971 | Emil i Lönneberga | Pigan Lina | |
| 1972 | Nya hyss av Emil i Lönneberga | Pigan Lina | |
| 1973 | Emil och griseknoen | Lina | |
| 1974 | Världens bästa Karlsson | Mrs. Johanson, the sales agent | |
| 1991 | Basaren | | TV film |
