= Julia Dufvenius =

Swedish actress (born 1975)

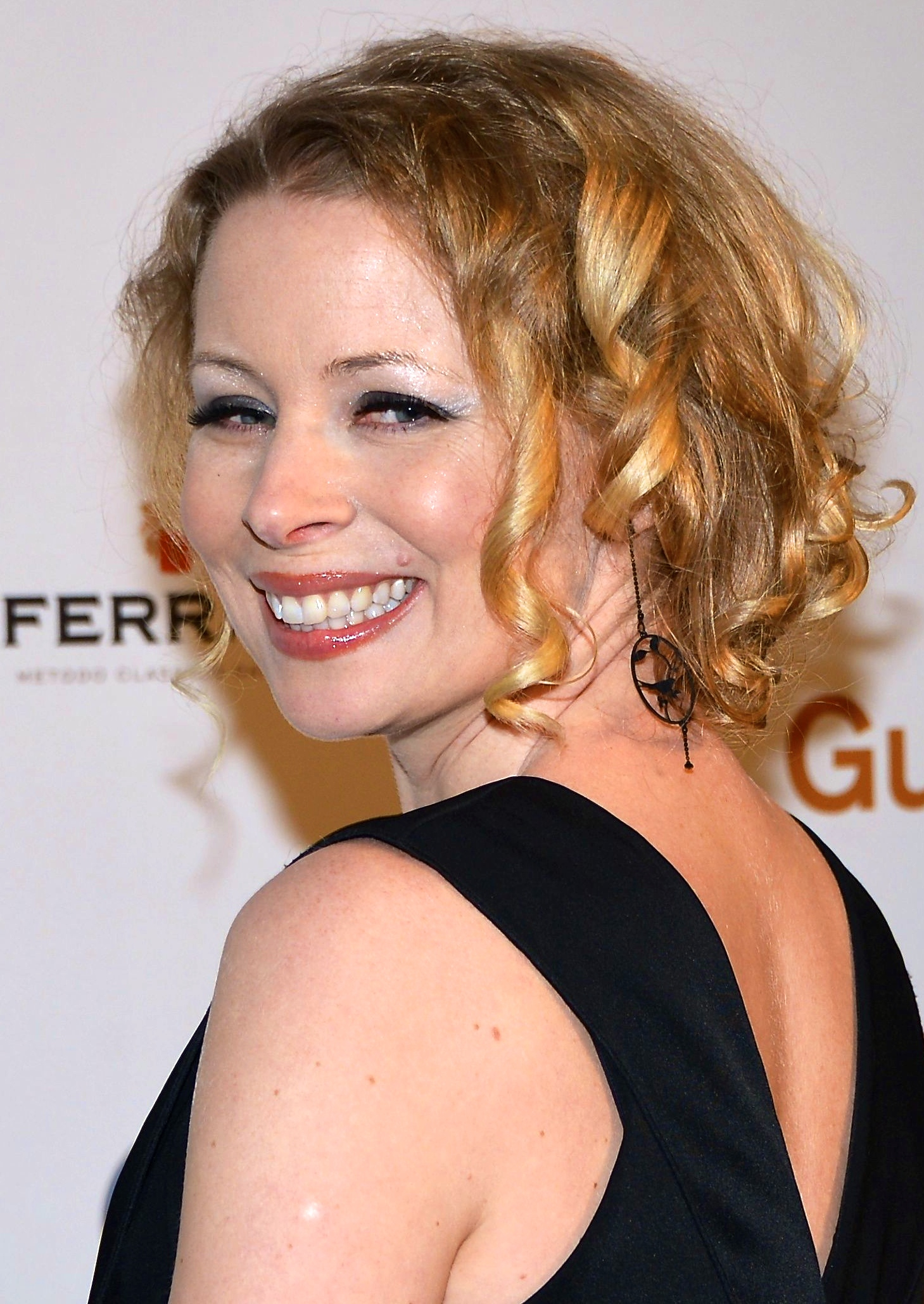
- Dufvenius at the 2013 Guldbagge Awards
- Born: Elin Julia Dufvenius; 8 October 1975 (age 51); Gothenburg, Sweden
- Occupation: Actress
- Spouse: Christopher Wollter
- Children: 2

Elin Julia Dufvenius Wollter (née Dufvenius; born 8 October 1975) is a Swedish actress. She has appeared in television shows, films, and stage plays. Her breakthrough role was in the television miniseries Glappet (1997). Dufvenius played a supporting role in Ingmar Bergman's last film, Saraband (2003).

== Early life ==
Dufvenius was born on 8 October 1975 in Gothenburg, Sweden. She was principally raised by her mother Lena, a television and theatre producer, in collective housing. Her father worked in the construction industry. Dufvenius has an older sister. As a child, she appeared in minor roles in her mother's theatre and television productions. This included appearing as a teenager in the SVT series Den andra våren (1989). The show was primarily filmed in Saint Petersburg, Russia. It never aired after several people involved in the production died in a fire during filming. After completing high school, she did an internship with Backa Theatre, and then studied at the Högskolan för scen och musik (Academy of Music and Drama), University of Gothenburg.

== Career ==
Her breakthrough was in 1997 when she starred as a strong and independent woman in the SVT miniseries Glappet. After graduation, she appeared in a small role in Ingmar Bergman's stage production of Friedrich Schiller's Mary Stuart (2000) at the Royal Dramatic Theatre. This led to Dufvenius getting a role, which was specially written for her, in Bergman's last film Saraband in 2003. At the Royal Dramatic Theatre, she has starred in several productions including playing Regan in King Lear (2003), Sofia in Uncle Vanya (2008), and the title role in Jane Eyre (2009).

In 2015, Dufvenius appeared in Den försvunna ringen at the Deutsches Theater in Berlin. The production involved actors and directors from several European nations. It was thematically inspired by Gotthold Ephraim Lessing's play Nathan the Wise.

Her television roles also include Häxdansen (2008), Gynekologen i Askim (2011), Mammor! (2016), and a lead role as a lawyer in Heder (2019). In the wake of the 2017 Me Too movement, she was one of a number of actresses who shared stories of harassment in the entertainment industry. Dufvenius went on leave from the Royal Dramatic Theatre, after criticising their handling of alleged harassment by a male colleague. In 2019, she appeared on the reality television show Stjärnorna på slottet.

== Personal life ==
Dufvenius is married to actor Christopher Wollter, and they have a daughter and a son.

== Filmography ==
- 1989 – Den andra våren (TV series)
- 1994 – År av drömmar (TV series)
- 1997 – Glappet (TV series)
- 2003 – Saraband
- 2005 – Den utvalde
- 2006 – Göta kanal 2 – kanalkampen
- 2007 – Arn – Tempelriddaren
- 2008 – Asterix at the Olympiad (Swedish voice)
- 2008 – Häxdansen (TV series)
- 2011 – Gynekologen i Askim (TV series)
- 2012 – Sune i Grekland
- 2013 – Molanders (TV series)
- 2013 – Sune på bilsemester
- 2015 – Modus (TV series)
- 2016 – Mammor (TV series)
- 2017 – Saknad
- 2017 – Sommaren med släkten (TV series)
- 2018 – Sommaren med släkten (TV series)
- 2018 – Sjölyckan (TV series)
- 2019 – Fartblinda (TV series)
- 2019 – Heder (TV series)
- 2019 – Stjärnorna på slottet (TV series)
- 2021 - En hederlig jul med Knyckertz (TV series)
