= Emil i Lönneberga =

Swedish series of children's novels

Emil in Lönneberga
- First book, first edition
- Author: Astrid Lindgren
- Illustrator: Björn Berg
- Country: Sweden
- Language: Swedish
- Genre: Children
- Publisher: Rabén & Sjögren
- Published: 1963-1997

Emil in Lönneberga (from Swedish: Emil i Lönneberga) is a series of children's novels, written by Astrid Lindgren in 1963, 1966 and 1970 respectively, about the trouble maker Emil Svensson who lives on a farm in the Lönneberga parish of Småland, Sweden.

In total twelve books were written between 1963 and 1997, which have appeared in 44 languages (2014), in most cases with the original Swedish illustrations by Björn Berg. There are three live-action film adaptations, released in 1971–1973, and an animated adaptation released in 2013.

== Emil the character ==
Emil Svensson lives on the farm Katthult ("Catholt" or "Catwood"), set in the village of Lönneberga in Småland around the year 1900, with his younger sister Ida, mother Alma and father Anton, the farmhand Alfred who shows great affection towards Emil and the farm maid Lina who, however, is unable to tolerate Emil's mischief (hyss). Sometimes old Krösa-Maja ("Lingonberry-Maia") comes to Katthult to help with domestic work and tell Emil and Ida stories about "mylingar", ghosts, murders and similar nasties and superstition. Emil does more "hyss" than there are days of the year, which one day brings the inhabitants of the village to such irritation that they collect money for Emil's mother to send Emil to America, but she gets angry and refuses, saying, "Emil is a nice little boy; we love him just the way he is". Alma writes down all Emil's "hyss" in blue notebooks, so Emil will remember what he did as a child when he reaches adulthood. Emil is resourceful, handy with all types of farm animals, and his pranks are always innocent and good-hearted.

In the three novels, written in 1963, 1966 and 1970 respectively, one may follow some of Emil's many pieces of mischief, for example:

1. One day when meat soup is served at Katthult, Emil puts his head into the big soup bowl, which gets stuck over his head.
2. A day in June, when a party is to be held at Katthult, Emil manages to raise up his little sister in the flagpole, and gets shut up by his father into the toolshed, as a punishment for his prank ("hyss"), where Emil always carves a wooden figure while waiting for being released. This time, however, Emil manages to escape on a plank he puts between the open windows in the toolshed and the food shed on the opposite side, and has his own party in the food shed with sausages, except the last sausage, which is served to Mrs Petrell who has traveled all the way from Vimmerby just to eat Alma's sausage.
3. One day in July, Emil traps his father in a rat trap, and later heaves both batters of blodpalt and raggmunk on his father's face, and carves his 100th wooden figure.
4. On the last day of October, an autumn market is held in Vimmerby and a comet is expected to hit the Earth. In Vimmerby, Emil manages to scare Mrs Petrell as well as the mayor of Vimmerby and the inhabitants of the town overall, but also acquires the horse Lukas without charge.
5. On the day after Christmas Day, Alfred's grandfather Stolle-Jocke comes to Katthult, along with Lill-Klossan, from the poorhouse, to tell that they haven't got any Christmas food ("julmat") to eat and Jocke hasn't got any snus, even though Emil's mother sent Emil to the poorhouse with a big basket of Christmas food and a little box of snus for Jocke, because Kommandoran ("the commanderess (of the poorhouse)") sabotaged everything by taking all of the Christmas food (and Jocke's snus) for herself. Emil manages to invite everyone from the poorhouse except Kommandoran to Katthult for a Christmas party, later referred to as the Big Tabberas in Katthult ("Stora Tabberaset i Katthult"), with the Christmas food left in the food shed which, however, was for the next day when the relatives in Ingatorp are invited for Christmas party, but Emil thinks they are "fat enough" and the poorhouse people need the food better. When Kommandoran comes to Katthult, in order to force them home to the poorhouse, she accidentally gets captured in a wolf pit Emil managed to dig in order to capture a possible wolf. Emil think it was a necessary punishment for Kommandoran, for her sins towards Stolle-Jocke and the other poor people. Finally, Emil forgives Kommandoran and tells Alfred to help her up from the wolf pit, upon which she escapes from Katthult forever.
6. In June the following summer, when the people of the Backhorva farm plan to emigrate to America, they hold an auction in which Emil manages to make several ludicrous but eventually successful deals which, however, make his father angry. The next day, Emil pretends Ida has typhus by painting her face blue. One summer night, the pig sow Emil's father bought in the auction gives birth to eleven piglets, but bites ten of them to death before Emil luckily rescues the eleventh. A few days later, the sow dies of some strange illness. Emil decides to raise the little piglet as if he were its mother.
7. One summer day, when Emil's mother brews cherry wine for Mrs. Petrell, Emil and the piglet accidentally eat the brewed cherries which make them drunk so that they cause terrible problems. The next day, they have both recovered, and are invited to Lönneberga Good Templar Association, to swear a promise to be sober forever, and thereafter keeps the whole Katthult in soberness, firstly by crushing the bottles with Mrs. Petrell's cherry wine. In late August, it is time for Emil to start school, where he proves to be the best one in his class.
8. A Sunday in November, a "husförhör" (a "house interview" in which the priest examines the household's knowledge of the Bible and Luther's Small Catechism) is held at Katthult, during which Emil's mother feels angry for Lina, who just gives wrong answers to the priest's questions mainly about Adam and Eve. After the end of "husförhöret", it is a great dinner with ostkaka ("cheesecake") as dessert. After eating ostkaka, Emil's mother tells Emil to go out and lock the hen shed, but Emil also manages to lock the outhouse, without any awareness that there is someone inside, and then shuts up his own father, who gets furious and attempts to get out through the window above the door, but gets stuck and can't get away before Alfred finally comes with a hand saw and cuts him free.
9. In the final chapter of the book series, Alfred cuts himself in the left thumb when carving räfsepinnar ("rake sticks") along with Emil, and becomes seriously ill in what is believed to be sepsis shortly before Christmas, when Småland is hit by a heavy winter storm. Despite the storm, and his parents' word that it is impossible to go to doctor, Emil desires one early morning, before anyone has woken up, to take Alfred on a sleigh to the doctor in Mariannelund, where Emil and the horse Lukas finally arrive after a tough struggle through the heavy snow and finally thanks to help from a snowplow. The day before Christmas Eve, Alfred may travel back home, still with a bandage on his thumb, and everyone in Lönneberga feels happy over Emil for his heroic act.

== In other languages ==
Country	Name	Note
Denmark	Emil fra Lønneberg	
Norway	Emil fra Lønneberget	
Germany	Michel aus Lönneberga	The name was changed from Emil for marketing reasons, as another Emil was established on the children's book market both in East and West Germany in the 1960s: the boy Emil Tischbein from Erich Kästner's Emil and the Detectives from the 1920s.
Iceland	Emil í Kattholti	
Italy	Emil	His Swedish films were shown on RAI TV in 1974.
Poland	Emil ze Smalandii	
France	Zozo la Tornade	Name translates to "Zozo Tornado".
Finland	Vaahteramäen Eemeli Eemeli of Vaahteramäki	Vaahteramäki is a direct translation of Lönneberga ("Maple Hill").
Lithuania	Emilis iš Lionebergos	
Russia	Эмиль из Лённеберги; Emil' iz Lyonnebergi	
Netherlands	Michiel van de Hazelhoeve	
Portugal	Emilio de Lönneberga	
Spain	Miguel el travieso	
Hungary	Juharfalvi Emil	
Slovakia	Emil z Lönnebergy	

== Film and television adaptations ==
- Emil i Lönneberga (1971)
- New Mischief by Emil (1972)
- Emil and the Piglet (1973)
- Michel aus Lönneberga, a German-Swedish TV series based on the three films.
- Emil's Mischiefs (1985), Latvian TV film
- That Boy Emil (2013)
