= Emy Storm =

Swedish actress

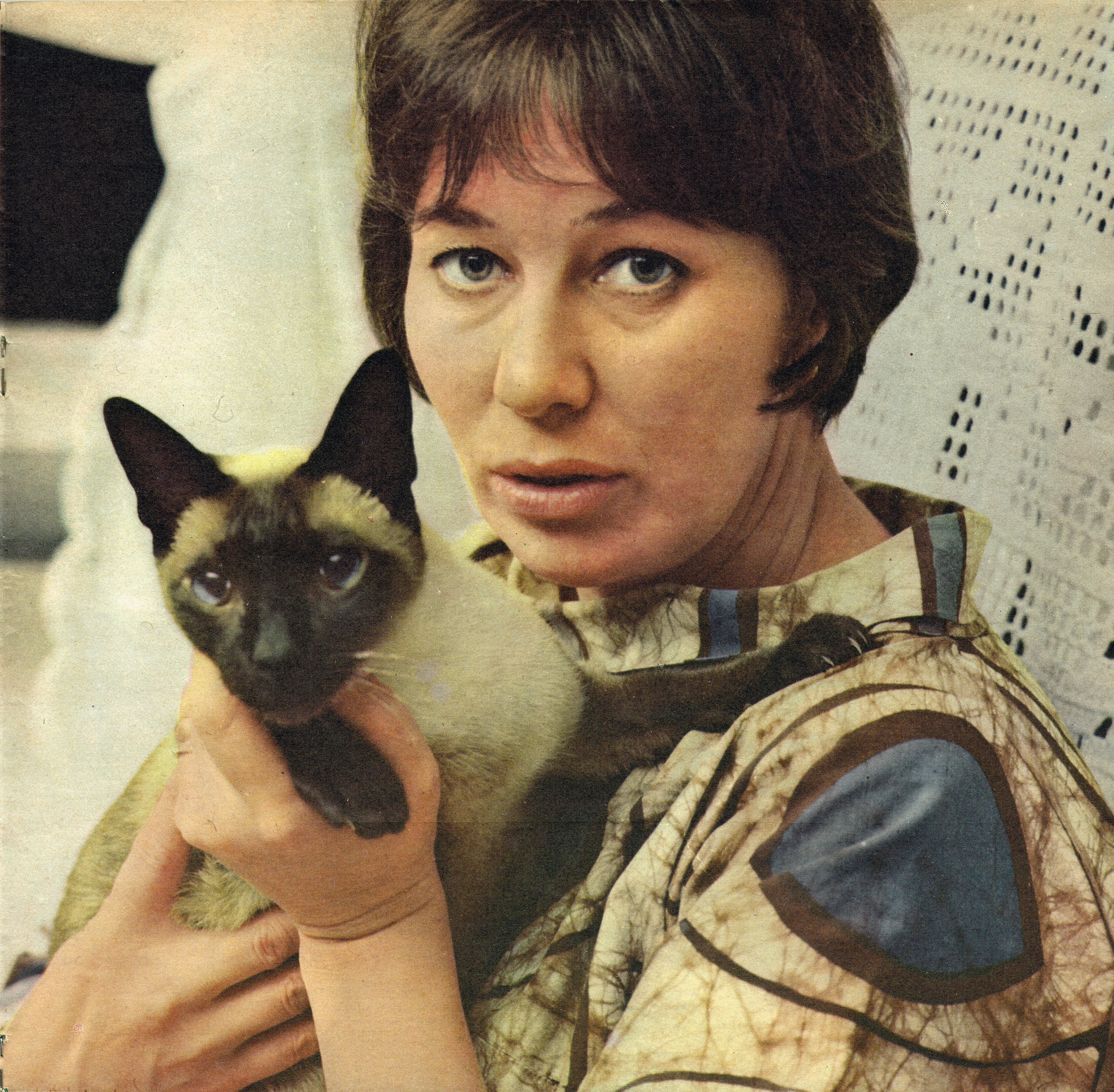
- Emy Storm as portraied in Allers in 1967
- Born: 20 May 1925; Alfta, Sweden
- Died: 24 November 2014 (aged 89); Malmö, Sweden
- Occupation: actress

Emmy Karolina Fyhring-Ljungberg (née Storm; 20 May 1925 – 24 November 2014), known professionally as Emy Storm, was a Swedish actress best known for her role as Alma, the mother of Emil i Lönneberga. Storm was married to actor Göte Fyhring (1929–2021).

== Biography ==
Emmy Karolina Storm was born at Alfta, Hälsingland, in 1925 and grew up in a forester-family. When she was 15 years old, she went to Stockholm and worked as maid and waitress. Already interested in acting, she became an actress a few years later. After one performance, the chief of Nordiska Kompaniet, Ragnar Sachs, hired her to work at the studio of Gösta Terserus, after which she appeared in films and on stage.

After studying at the Royal Dramatic Training Academy, she obtained a position at the National Swedish Touring Theatre, where she worked until 1956, when she started working at Östgötateatern. After working at the Royal Dramatic Theatre she worked at Malmö City Theatre from 1962 to 1983. Emy Storm died after suffering a stroke on 24 November 2014; she was 89 years old, and survived by her son, Jonas Fyhring-Ljungberg.

== Selected filmography ==
- 2005 - Wallander – Mörkret
- 2002 - The Fifth Woman (TV)
- 2001 - Fru Marianne (TV)
- 2000 - Ronny & Julia (TV)
- 1996 - Mysteriet på Greveholm (TV)
- 1991 - The Best Intentions (TV)
- 1986 - Bödeln och skökan
- 1981 - Rasmus på luffen
- 1981 - Operation Leo
- 1980 - Sverige åt svenskarna
- 1978 - Hedebyborna (TV)
- 1971–73 - Emil i Lönneberga
- 1967 - Kullamannen
- 1964 - Dear John
- 1963 - Raven's End
- 1955 - Getting Married
- 1955 - People of the Finnish Forests
- 1953 - The Road to Klockrike
- 1953 - Ursula, the Girl from the Finnish Forests
- 1953 - All the World's Delights
- 1952 - Hon kom som en vind
- 1951 - In the Arms of the Sea
- 1950 - Andersson's Kalle
- 1948 - Banketten
