= Lena Wisborg =

Swedish actress

Lena Elisabet Wisborg Candinger (born 24 September 1965 in Huddinge, Stockholm County) is a Swedish former child actor, well known for her role as Ida in Emil i Lönneberga. After her apprearence in the 1979 TV series Katitzi she decided to leave her acting career.
