= Martina Montelius =

Swedish author, director and playwright (born 1975)

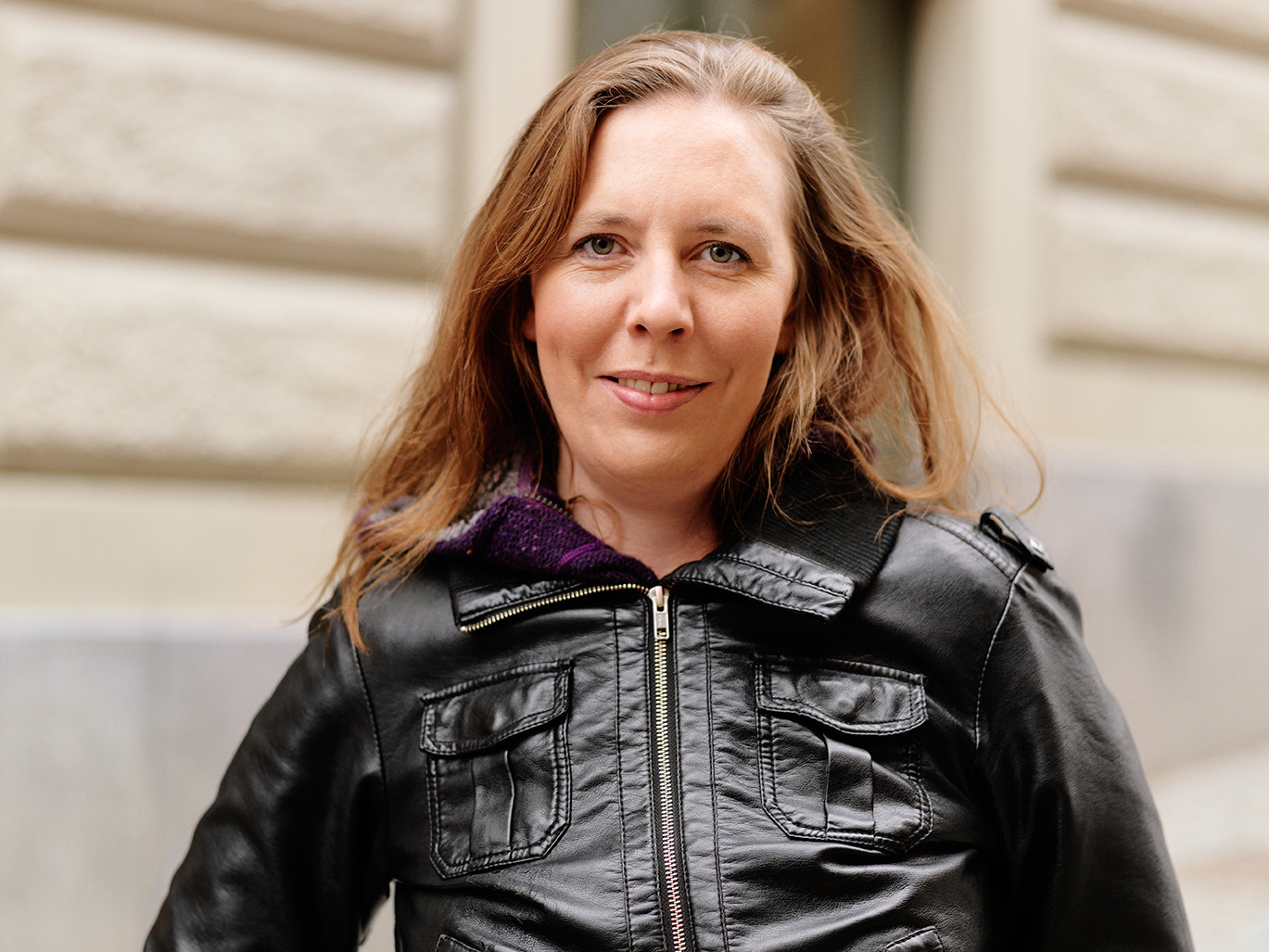
- Martina Montelius (2013)
- Born: 19 July 1975 (age 50); Stockholm, Sweden
- Occupation: Author
- Mother: Kristina Lugn
- Relatives: Robert Lugn (grandfather)

Martina Montelius (born 19 July 1975) is a Swedish author, director and playwright. She has written several plays, had three novels published, and also worked as an artistic director.

== Career ==
Montelius grew up in Täby, Sweden and went to school at the Eriksdalsschool. During her teenage years, she worked at a library at Medborgarplatsen and later worked for the Royal Dramatic Theatre and Teater Plaza. At Plaza she started a long co-operation with actor and director Thorsten Flinck. She was a director and actress for his shows before starting to write her own work.

In 2000, she made her debut as a playwright with the play Usch, nu blev jag lite mulen, and has since written fifteen more plays. In 2011 she was appointed artistic director for the Teater Brunnsgatan Fyra Theater, a job she took over from her mother. In November 2013, she had her first book published, Främlingsleguanen, which was published by Bokförlaget Atlas.

== In popular culture ==
In 2013, Montelius was a contestant on På spåret at SVT along with Dominika Peczynski. She hosted her own episode of the popular Swedish talk radio show Sommar i P1 in summer 2014. Her episode was broadcast live while most Sommar i P1 episodes are pre-recorded and then aired. Her episode was reviewed by Svenska Dagbladet, who described it as "controlled madness and seductive".

== Personal life ==
Montelius is the daughter of the poet and dramatist Kristina Lugn. She has two children with her husband. Montelius has said that she grew up in an artistic family and that she herself now is looking for the regular family life.

Daughter Hilda Montelius Hellgren died on March 26, 2024, aged 19.
