= List of Swedish child actors =

This is a list of child actors from Sweden. Films and/or television series they appeared in are mentioned only if they were still a child at the time of filming.

Current child actors (under the age of eighteen) are indicated by boldface.

== A ==
- Jesper Adefelt (born 1989)
  - 1999: C/o Segemyhr (one episode)
  - 2001: Harry Potter and the Philosopher's Stone (Swedish voice of Ron Weasley)
  - 2002: Return to Never Land (Swedish voice of Slightly)
  - 2004–2009: Winx Club (Swedish voice of Riven and Helia)
  - 2004–2007: Kim Possible (Swedish voice of Wade Load)
  - 2005: Wallander – Mörkret
  - 2006: High School Musical (Swedish voice of Chad Danforth)
  - 2007: Shrek the Third (Swedish voice of Arthur "Artie" Pendragon)
  - 2007: Winx Club: The Secret of the Lost Kingdom (Swedish voice of Riven)
- Fredrik af Trampe (born 1984)
  - 1995: Duvslaget
  - 1999–2000: Eva & Adam
  - 2001: Eva & Adam – fyra födelsedagar och ett fiasko
  - 2002: Klassfesten
- Sven Almgren (born 1944)
  - 1955: Luffaren och Rasmus
  - 1956: Swing it, fröken!
  - 1956: Night Child
  - 1956: Rasmus, Pontus och Toker
  - 1957: Bill Bergson Lives Dangerously
  - 1957: Mother Takes a Vacation
  - 1959: Raggare! (English: Blackjackets)
  - 1959: Enslingen i blåsväder
  - 1960: Tre önskningar
  - 1960: Balkongen
  - 1960: Simon och Laura
- Liv Alsterlund (born 1971)
  - 1979: Madicken (TV series)
  - 1979: Du är inte klok, Madicken
  - 1980: Madicken på Junibacken
  - 1980: To Be a Millionaire
  - 1982: En flicka på halsen
  - 1982: Ett hjärta av guld
- Hanna Alström (born 1981)
  - 1988: The Land Before Time (voice of Cera in the Swedish dub)
  - 1988: Gull-Pian
  - 1994: Bert
  - 1995: Bert: The Last Virgin
  - 1995: Anmäld försvunnen
  - 1996: Skuggornas hus
  - 1998–2000: Skärgårdsdoktorn
  - 1998–1999: Vita lögner
  - 1998: Aspiranterna
  - 1998: Längtans blåa blomma
  - 1999: Sherdil
- Martin Andersson (born 1979)
  - 1992: Lotta på Bråkmakargatan
  - 1993: Lotta flyttar hemifrån
  - 1994: Bert
  - 1995: Bert: The Last Virgin
- Björn Andrésen (born 1955)
  - 1971: Death in Venice
- Josefin Årling (born 1983)
  - 1996: Bill Bergson Lives Dangerously
  - 1997: Bill Bergson and the White Rose Rescue
- Kim Åsberg (born 1951)
  - 1960: The Children of Bullerbyn Village
  - 1961: Bara roligt i Bullerbyn
- Inger Axö (1939-1986)
  - 1953: Åsa-Nisse on Holiday
  - 1953: Bill Bergson and the White Rose Rescue
  - 1955: Blockerat spår
  - 1955: The Girl in the Rain
  - 1956: Swing it, fröken!

== B ==
- Ulrika Bergman (born 1985)
  - 1999–2000: Eva & Adam
  - 2001: Eva & Adam – fyra födelsedagar och ett fiasko
- Linda Bergström (born 1977)
  - 1986: The Children of Noisy Village
  - 1987: More About the Children of Noisy Village
  - 1995: Anmäld försvunnen
- Zacharias Blad (born 1990)
  - 2005: Karlsson på taket (voice)
- David Boati (born 1979)
  - 1984: Åke and His World
  - 1992: En komikers uppväxt
  - 1994: Bert
  - 1995: Bert: The Last Virgin
  - 1996: Sexton
  - 1997: Pappas flicka

== C ==
- Bernt Callenbo (1932–2011)
  - 1947: Bill Bergson, Master Detective
  - 1949: The Devil and the Smalander
- Sven-Axel Carlsson (1932–1971)
  - 1947: Bill Bergson, Master Detective
  - 1947: The Key and the Ring
  - 1950: This Can't Happen Here
  - 1950: The Motor Cavaliers
  - 1950: Fiancée for Hire

== D ==
- Alexandra Dahlström (born 1984)
  - 1997: Sanning eller konsekvens
  - 1998: St. Mikael
  - 1998: Fucking Åmål
  - 1999: Tomten är far till alla barnen
- Eskil Dalenius (born 1945)
  - 1952: Son av Navajo (voice)
  - 1953: Bill Bergson and the White Rose Rescue
  - 1955: Luffaren och Rasmus
  - 1956: Rasmus, Pontus och Toker
- Peder Dam (1939–1987)
  - 1953: Bill Bergson and the White Rose Rescue
  - 1954: Storm over Tjurö
  - 1954: Taxi 13
  - 1955: Mord, lilla vän
  - 1957: Vägen genom Skå
- Kajsa Dandenell (born 1963)
  - 1965: Tjorven och Skrållan
  - 1966: Tjorven och Mysak
  - 1967: Skrållan, Ruskprick och Knorrhane
- Ellen Demérus (born 1975)
  - 1986: The Children of Noisy Village
  - 1987: More About the Children of Noisy Village

== E ==
- Catti Edfeldt (born 1950)
  - 1960: The Children of Bullerbyn Village
  - 1961: Bara roligt i Bullerbyn
  - 1964: Loving Couples
  - 1966: Heja Roland!
  - 1966: Here Is Your Life
  - 1968: Who Saw Him Die?
- Tove Edfeldt (born 1983)
  - 1986: The Children of Noisy Village
  - 1987: More About the Children of Noisy Village
  - 1993: Roseanna
  - 1998: S:t Mikael
  - 2000: Barnen på Luna
  - 2001: Spökafton
  - 2001: Eva & Adam – fyra födelsedagar och ett fiasko
- Josefin Edvardsson (born 1985)
  - 1997: Kenny Starfighter
  - 2000: Jesus lever
  - 2001: En ängels tålamod
  - 2001: Agnes
  - 2003: One Way Trip

== F ==
- Ellen Fjæstad (born 1986)
  - 1998: Pippi Långstrump (voice)
  - 1999–2000: Eva & Adam
  - 2001: Eva & Adam – fyra födelsedagar och ett fiasko
  - 2002: Return to Never Land (Swedish voice of Jane)
  - 2004: Brandy & Mr. Whiskers (one episode, Swedish dub)
  - 2004: The Ketchup Effect
  - 2004: Gränsland (short film)
- Malte Forsberg (born 1985)
  - 1996: Bill Bergson Lives Dangerously
  - 1997: Bill Bergson and the White Rose Rescue

== G ==
- Anton Glanzelius (born 1974)
  - 1985: My Life as a Dog

== H ==
- Dan Håfström (born 1972)
  - 1984: Ronia, the Robber's Daughter
  - 1987: Idag röd
- Leo Hallerstam (born 1986)
  - 1997: Home Alone 3 (Swedish voice of Alex Pruitt)
  - 1999: The Three Friends and Jerry (voice in the Swedish dub)
  - 1999: Marvellous Milly (short film, voice)
  - 1999: Toy Story 2 (Swedish voice of Andy Davis)
  - 1999: The Iron Giant (Swedish voice of Hogarth Hughes)
  - 2001: En dag i taget
  - 2001: Harry Potter and the Philosopher's Stone (Swedish voice of Fred and George Weasley)
  - 2002: Beck – Pojken i glaskulan
  - 2002: Harry Potter and the Chamber of Secrets (Swedish voice of Fred and George Weasley)
  - 2004: Thunderbirds (voice in the Swedish dub)
  - 2004: Harry Potter and the Prisoner of Azkaban (Swedish voice of Fred and George Weasley)
- Staffan Hallerstam (born 1957)
  - 1967: Kullamannen
  - 1969: Kråkguldet
  - 1969: Pippi Longstocking
  - 1970: Pippi in the South Seas
  - 1972: The Man Who Quit Smoking
  - 1974: Världens bästa Karlsson
- Grete Havnesköld (born 1986)
  - 1992: Lotta på Bråkmakargatan
  - 1993: Lotta flyttar hemifrån
  - 1997: Selma & Johanna – en roadmovie
- Kåre Hedebrant (born 1995)
  - 2008: Let the Right One In
  - 2011: Amors Baller (English: Cupid's Balls)
- Jasmine Heikura (born 1986)
  - 1995: My Neighbor Totoro (Swedish voice of Mei)
  - 1997: Chock. Det ringer
  - 1997: Pippi Longstocking (voice)
  - 1997–1998: Pippi Longstocking (TV series, voice)
  - 1998: Aspiranterna
  - 1998: The Glassblower's Children
  - 1999: Marvellous Milly (short film, voice)
  - 1999–2000: Digimon Adventure (Swedish voice of Sora, Yolei and Kari)
  - 2000: Digimon: The Movie (Swedish voice of Sora)
  - 2000–2014: Dora the Explorer (Swedish voice of Boots)
  - 2000: Together
  - 2001: Spökafton
  - 2001: Harry Potter and the Philosopher's Stone (Swedish voice of Hermione Granger and Ginny Weasley)
  - 2002: The Wild Thornberrys Movie (Swedish voice of Sarah Wellington)
  - 2002: Harry Potter and the Chamber of Secrets (Swedish voice of Hermione Granger)
  - 2003–2010: Max & Ruby (Swedish voice of Ruby Bunny)
  - 2003–2004: Jakers! The Adventures of Piggley Winks (Swedish voice of Piggley Winks)
  - 2004: Harry Potter and the Prisoner of Azkaban (Swedish voice of Hermione Granger)
- Christopher Heino-Lindberg (born 1985)
  - 1999-2000: Eva & Adam
- Tove Hellbom (born 1958)
  - 1960: The Children of Bullerbyn Village
  - 1961: Bara roligt i Bullerbyn
- Gabriel Hermelin (born 1983)
  - 1994: Bara du & jag
  - 1997: Kenny Starfighter
  - 1999: Eva & Adam
- Carl-Robert Holmer-Kårell (born 1986)
  - 1999–2000: Eva & Adam
  - 2001: Eva & Adam – fyra födelsedagar och ett fiasko
- Birgitta Hörnblad (1944-1998)
  - 1957: Bill Bergson Lives Dangerously
- Jan Erik Husbom (born 1951)
  - 1960: The Children of Bullerbyn Village
  - 1961: Bara roligt i Bullerbyn

== J ==
- Kristina Jämtmark (born 1957)
  - 1964: Vi på Saltkråkan
  - 1964: Tjorven, Båtsman och Moses
  - 1965: Tjorven och Skrållan
  - 1966: Tjorven och Mysak
  - 1967: Skrållan, Ruskprick och Knorrhane
- Erik Johansson (born 1979)
  - 1994: Bert
  - 1995: Bert: The Last Virgin
  - 1997: Sanning eller konsekvens
- Maria Johansson (born 1956)
  - 1964: Vi på Saltkråkan
  - 1964: Tjorven, Båtsman och Moses
  - 1965: Tjorven och Skrållan
  - 1966: Tjorven och Mysak
  - 1967: Skrållan, Ruskprick och Knorrhane
- Olle Johansson (1934-2018)
  - 1947: Bill Bergson, Master Detective
  - 1952: Classmates
- Rolf Johansson (born 1941)
  - 1955: The Light from Lund
  - 1958: Musik ombord
  - 1959: Swinging at the Castle
- Tomas Johansson (born 1951)
  - 1960: The Children of Bullerbyn Village
  - 1961: Bara roligt i Bullerbyn

== K ==
- Melinda Kinnaman (born 1971)
  - 1985: My Life as a Dog
- Jim Ramel Kjellgren (born 1987)
  - 1999–2000: Eva & Adam
  - 2001: Eva & Adam – fyra födelsedagar och ett fiasko
  - 2001: Days Like This
  - 2004: Kyrkogårdsön
  - 2005: Storm

== L ==
- Henrik Larsson (born 1977)
  - 1986: The Children of Noisy Village
  - 1987: More About the Children of Noisy Village
- Lina Leandersson (born 1995)
  - 2008: Let the Right One In
- Rebecka Liljeberg (born 1981)
  - 1991: Sunes jul
  - 1997: Närkontakt (short film)
  - 1998: Längtans blåa blomma
  - 1998: Fucking Åmål
  - 1999: Sherdil
  - 1999: Där regnbågen slutar
  - 1999–2000: Eva & Adam
- Jonna Liljendahl (born 1970)
  - 1979: Madicken (TV series)
  - 1979: Du är inte klok, Madicken
  - 1980: Madicken på Junibacken
  - 1983: Jullovsmorgon
- Erik Lindgren (born 1972)
  - 1981: Rasmus på luffen
  - 1985: Peter-No-Tail in Americat (voice)
  - 1985: The Black Cauldron (voice of Taran in the Swedish dub)
  - 1985: Vägen till Gyllenblå!
  - 1986: Rasmus på luffen (TV series)
- Stephen Lindholm (born 1954)
  - 1964: Vi på Saltkråkan
  - 1964: Tjorven, Båtsman och Moses
  - 1965: Tjorven och Skrållan
  - 1966: Tjorven och Mysak
  - 1967: Skrållan, Ruskprick och Knorrhane
- Jonatan Lindoff (born 1982)
  - 1990: Nils Karlsson Pyssling
- Jenny Lindroth (born 1979)
  - 1993: Den korsikanske biskopen
  - 1994: 13-årsdagen
  - 1996: Drömprinsen – filmen om Em
  - 1997: Nattbuss 807
  - 1997: Välkommen till festen
- Oskar Löfkvist (born 1980)
  - 1997: Beck
  - 1990: Nils Karlsson Pyssling
- Oliver Loftéen (1979–2021)
  - 1991: Underground Secrets
  - 1991: "Harry Lund" lägger näsan i blöt!
  - 1992: Maskeraden
  - 1992: Den korsikanske biskopen
  - 1994: Bert
  - 1995: Bert: The Last Virgin
  - 1997: Skärgårdsdoktorn
  - 1997: Tic Tac
- Harald Lönnbro (born 1975)
  - 1979: Skrotsemestern
  - 1986: The Children of Noisy Village
  - 1987: More About the Children of Noisy Village
  - 1989: Nånting levande åt Lame-Kal (short film)
  - 1990–2006: Hem till byn
  - 1990: Kurt Olsson – filmen om mitt liv som mej själv
- Lars-Erik Lundberg (born 1940)
  - 1953: Bill Bergson and the White Rose Rescue
  - 1954: Storm over Tjurö
  - 1954: Salka Valka

== M ==
- Rosanna Munter (born 1987)
  - 2001: Eva & Adam – fyra födelsedagar och ett fiasko

== N ==
- Inger Nilsson (born 1959)
  - 1969: Pippi Longstocking
  - 1969: Pippi Longstocking
  - 1969: Pippi Goes on Board
  - 1970: Pippi in the South Seas
  - 1970: Pippi on the Run
  - 1973: Här kommer Pippi Långstrump
- Leif Nilsson (1943-2014)
  - 1952: Blondie, Beef and the Banana
  - 1954: Seger i mörker
  - 1955: Den glade skomakaren
  - 1956: Pettersson i Annorlunda
  - 1957: Synnöve Solbakken
  - 1958: The Lady in Black
  - 1958: Mannequin in Red
  - 1960: Balkongen
- Elisabeth Nordkvist (born 1951)
  - 1960: The Children of Bullerbyn Village
  - 1961: Bara roligt i Bullerbyn
  - 1969: En dröm om frihet
- Lena Nyman (1944-2011)
  - 1955: Farligt löfte
  - 1955: Luffaren och Rasmus
  - 1958: Musik ombord

== O ==
- Jan Ohlsson (born 1962)
  - 1971: Emil i Lönneberga
  - 1972: New Mischief by Emil
  - 1973: Emil and the Piglet
  - 1975–1976: Michel aus Lönneberga
  - 1977: Terror of Frankenstein
  - 1978: Dante – akta’re för Hajen!
- Lillemor Österlund (born 1951)
  - 1964: Vi på Saltkråkan
  - 1964: Tjorven, Båtsman och Moses
  - 1965: Tjorven och Skrållan

== P ==
- Philip Panov (born 1984)
  - 1999: Eva & Adam
  - 2002: Love Boogie
  - 2002: The Dog Trick
- Maria Persson (born 1959)
  - 1969: Pippi Longstocking
  - 1969: Pippi Longstocking
  - 1969: Pippi Goes on Board
  - 1970: Pippi in the South Seas
  - 1970: Pippi on the Run
  - 1973: Här kommer Pippi Långstrump
- Louise Peterhoff (born 1977)
  - 1989: Nånting levande åt Lame-Kal

== S ==
- Anna Sahlene (born 1976)
  - 1986: The Children of Noisy Village
  - 1987: More About the Children of Noisy Village
- Björn Söderbäck (born 1951)
  - 1964: Vi på Saltkråkan
  - 1964: Tjorven, Båtsman och Moses
  - 1965: Tjorven och Skrållan
- Lars Söderdahl (born 1964)
  - 1974: Världens bästa Karlsson
  - 1977: The Brothers Lionheart
  - 1977: Himmel och pannkaka
- Johan Stattin (born 1984)
  - 1996: Bill Bergson Lives Dangerously
  - 1997: Bill Bergson and the White Rose Rescue
  - 1997: Kenny Starfighter
- Totte Steneby (born 1983)
  - 1996: Bill Bergson Lives Dangerously
  - 1996: Pin up
  - 1997: Bill Bergson and the White Rose Rescue
  - 1997: Sanning eller konsekvens
  - 2000: Barnen på Luna
- Urban Strand (born 1950)
  - 1964: Vi på Saltkråkan
  - 1964: Tjorven, Båtsman och Moses
  - 1965: Tjorven och Skrållan
- Pär Sundberg (born 1957)
  - 1969: Pippi Longstocking
  - 1969: Pippi Longstocking
  - 1969: Pippi Goes on Board
  - 1970: Pippi in the South Seas
  - 1970: Pippi on the Run
  - 1973: Här kommer Pippi Långstrump
- William Svedberg (born 1992)
  - 1997: Bill Bergson and the White Rose Rescue
  - 1999: Julens hjältar
  - 1999: Mamy Blue
  - 1999: Stora & små mirakel (short film)
  - 2002: Karlsson på taket (voice)
  - 2004: Veddemålet
  - 2005: Skattejakten
- Tobias Swärd (born 1986)
  - 1989–1990: The New Adventures of Winnie the Pooh (Swedish voice of Christopher Robin)
  - 1994: Kan du vissla Johanna?
  - 1997–2001: Recess (Swedish voice of T.J. Detweiler)
  - 1999: Seasons of Giving (Swedish voice of Christopher Robin)
  - 2001–2003: The Book of Pooh (Swedish voice of Christopher Robin)
  - 2001: Recess: School's Out (Swedish voice of T.J. Detweiler)
  - 2001: Cats & Dogs (Swedish voice of Scotty Brody)
  - 2001: Harry Potter and the Philosopher's Stone (film) (Swedish voice of Vincent Crabbe and Gregory Goyle)
  - 2002: Harry Potter and the Chamber of Secrets (Swedish voice of Vincent Crabbe and Gregory Goyle)
  - 2002: Return to Never Land (Swedish voice of Cubby)
  - 2004: Harry Potter and the Prisoner of Azkaban (Swedish voice of Vincent Crabbe and Gregory Goyle)

== T ==
- Johan Tillenius (born 1977)
  - 1994: Bert
  - 1995: Bert: The Last Virgin
  - 1995: Vi skulle ju bli lyckliga...
- Ulf Törneman-Stenhammar (born 1932)
  - 1947: Bill Bergson, Master Detective

== U ==
- Bitte Ulvskog (born 1951)
  - 1964: Vi på Saltkråkan
  - 1964: Tjorven, Båtsman och Moses
  - 1965: Tjorven och Skrållan

== W ==
- Crispin Dickson Wendenius (born 1975)
  - 1986: The Children of Noisy Village
  - 1987: More About the Children of Noisy Village
  - 1987: Mio in the Land of Faraway (Swedish dub)
- Mats Wikström (born 1964)
  - 1974: Världens bästa Karlsson
- Lena Wisborg (born 1965)
  - 1971: Emil i Lönneberga
  - 1972: New Mischief by Emil
  - 1973: Emil and the Piglet
  - 1975–1976: Michel aus Lönneberga
  - 1979: Katitzi (one episode)
- Lena Wixell (born 1950)
  - 1960: The Children of Bullerbyn Village
  - 1961: Bara roligt i Bullerbyn

== Z ==
- Hanna Zetterberg (born 1973)
  - 1984: Ronia, the Robber's Daughter
- Zara Zetterqvist (born 1980)
  - 1988: Gull-Pian
  - 1988: Jungfruresan
  - 1989: 1939
  - 1993: Drömkåken
  - 1994: Tre kronor
  - 1997: 9 millimeter
  - 1997: Slutspel
