= Är det så här när man är kär =

Single by Sven-Olof Sandberg
- A-side: "Är det så här när man är kär"
- B-side: "Jazzinstrumentens Nachspiel"
- Released: January 1938
- Recorded: Stockholm, Sweden, November 1937
- Genre: popular music/schlager
- Label: Sonora
- Songwriters: Sven Goon, Gösta Rybrant

"Är det så här när man är kär" is a song written by Sven Goon, Gösta Rybrant, and originally recorded in Stockholm in November 1937 by Sven-Olof Sandberg with Willard Ringstrand's band, scoring a 1938 success with the song. The song was also released as a 78 rpm record at Sonora 3331 in Sweden and rpm Telefunken T-8134 in Norway. The song was also recorded by Cool Candys on their 1965 album Twist Party and by Carin Swensson in 1978 on her album Bondkomikerns dotter.

On 15 October 1994, the episode Erik the Great of the Bert TV series aired, featuring fictional band Heman Hunters performing the song with Bert having heard it at a record at his grandmother's home, before Klimpen arrives, disturbing the entire performance. The song also appeared on the 1994 Berts bästa betraktelser soundtrack album. giving the song revival.
