= Älskade ängel =

Single by Lill-Babs & Heman Hunters

from the album Berts bästa betraktelser
- A-side: "Älskade ängel"
- B-side: "Älskade ängel" (remix)
- Released: 1994
- Genre: schlager
- Label: Änglatroll
- Songwriter: Per Johan Widestrand

"Älskade ängel" is a song, written by Per Johan Widestrand and recorded by Lill-Babs. The single was released under the name Lill-Babs & Heman Hunters and in 1994 the song was used as signature melody for the SVT TV series Bert , where the refrain can be heard. In the TV series, Bert is seen dancing at the mirror when the song was played, while appearing words showed the episode title.

In 2004 the song was on Lill-Babs compilation album Lill-Babs i lyxförpackning.

The song became a Svensktoppen hit for nine weeks, during the period 10 December 1994 – 14 January 1995, peaking at second position.

The Playtones also performed the song at Dansbandskampen 2009, when Lill-Babs was tonight's theme in the second round. The song was also recorded on their 2010 album Rock'n'Roll Dance Party.

Black Jack recorded the song on the 2012 album Casino.
