= The Six Bullerby Children =

Series of children's books by Astrid Lindgren

- All About the Bullerby Children, first edition (1947)
- Author: Astrid Lindgren
- Illustrator: Ingrid Vang Nyman; Ilon Wikland
- Cover artist: Ingrid Vang Nyman; Ilon Wikland
- Country: Sweden
- Language: Swedish
- Genre: Children
- Publisher: Rabén & Sjögren
- Published: 1947-1966

Astrid Lindgren wrote four books featuring the Six Bullerby Children (in the US released as The Children of Noisy Village):

- All About the Bullerby Children
- Cherry Time at Bullerby
- Six Bullerby Children
- Springtime at Bullerby

It was originally published in 1947 in Sweden. It has since been translated into 39 languages and published in many countries including the United States and the United Kingdom.

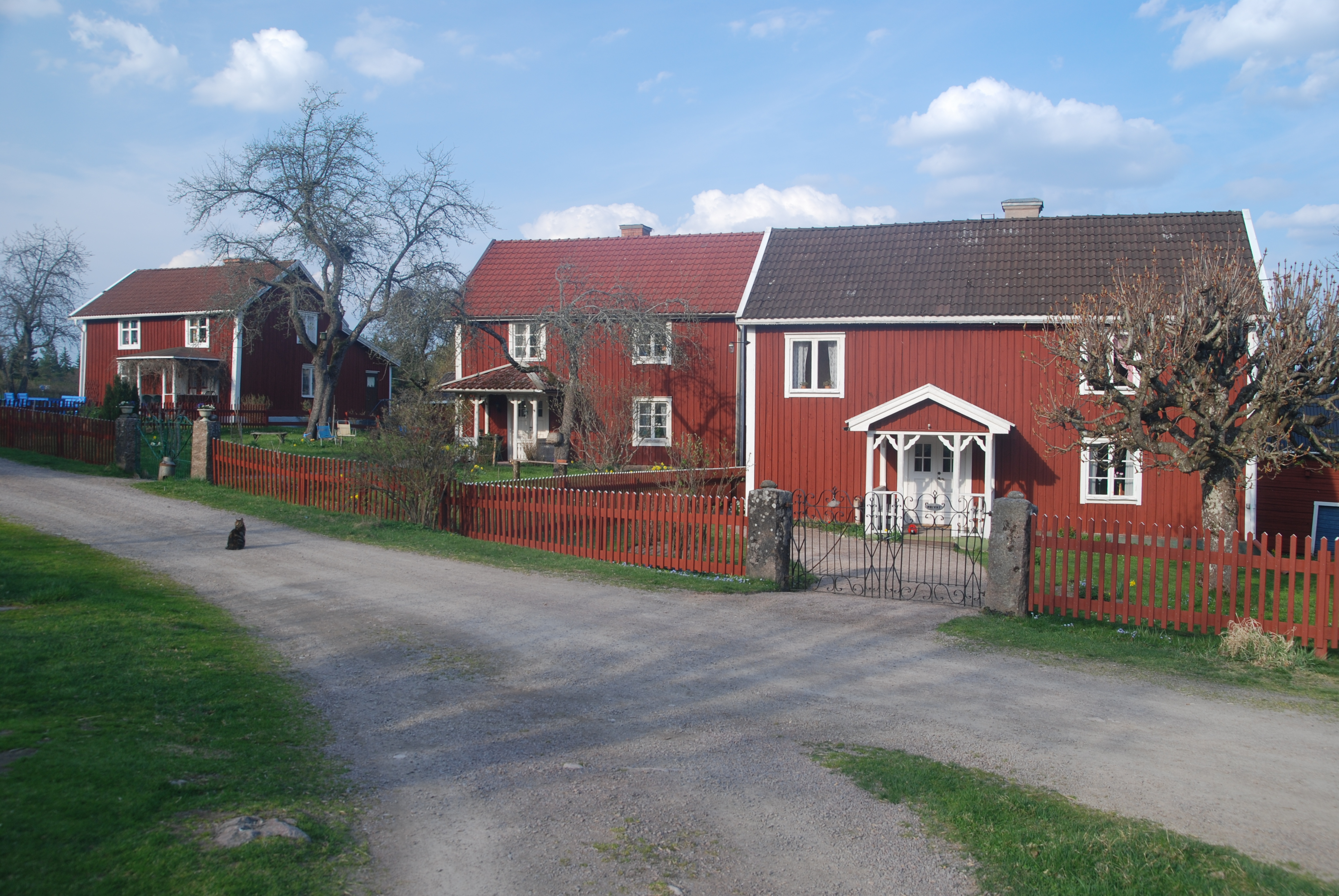
The houses of Bullerby (in reality Sevedstorp), 2009

These books are about six children living in a tiny, remote village in Sweden and are set in the late 1930s, a relatively calm time in Sweden, although a war "starting soon" is sometimes briefly mentioned in newspapers the children are reading. The agricultural world is still in a pre-industrial state (no tractors or harvesters) and the arrival of a car is a big event, because the road ends there. School and shops are available in Storby, the large village nearby.

The narrator is a young girl named Lisa, who tells about her life and adventures in the small and neat Swedish village Bullerby. The village consists of three lined up houses in which live seven children with their parents and housekeepers: Lisa with her older brothers Lasse and Bosse, the siblings Britta and Anna, as well as Olle with his younger sister Kerstin.

Bullerby is represented by the small village of Sevedstorp where Lindgren's father grew up (10 miles from her hometown of Vimmerby and the village of Näs, where she was born).

== Films ==
- 1960 – The Children of Bullerbyn Village (television), directed by Olle Hellbom
- 1986 – The Children of Noisy Village, directed by Lasse Hallström
- 1987 – More About the Children of Noisy Village, directed by Lasse Hallström

The television series from 1960 was also re-edited into two feature films, Alla vi barn i Bullerbyn (1960) and Bara roligt i Bullerbyn (1961). The two films by Lasse Hallström were reworked into a seven-episode TV-series, titled Alla vi barn i Bullerbyn, that was broadcast in 1989. Some scenes in the film adaptations were shot in the small hamlet Stensjö by in Småland.
