= Prison (1949 film) =

1949 film by Ingmar Bergman

- UK DVD cover
- Directed by: Ingmar Bergman
- Written by: Ingmar Bergman
- Produced by: Lorens Marmstedt
- Starring: Doris Svedlund; Birger Malmsten; Eva Henning
- Cinematography: Göran Strindberg
- Edited by: Lennart Wallén
- Music by: Erland von Koch
- Release dates: 19 March 1949 (Sweden); 4 July 1962 (US)
- Running time: 76 minutes
- Country: Sweden
- Language: Swedish
- Budget: $30,000

Prison (Swedish: Fängelse), also known as The Devil's Wanton in the United States, is a 1949 Swedish drama film directed by Ingmar Bergman. It is the earliest film directed by Bergman to be based on his own original screenplay.

== Plot ==
Other than film-maker Martin Grandé, the characters are types: Thomas, a writer; his wife Sofi, who leaves him after he proposes a suicide pact; Birgitta Carolina Søderberg, a teenage prostitute; and Peter, her pimp by whom she has a child that he kills. The film presents Thomas living the scenario that Grandé and he discussed, a world that is really Hell and ruled by the Devil instead of God. He and Birgitta are unable to escape their unhappiness together.

== Cast ==
- Doris Svedlund – Birgitta Carolina Søderberg
- Birger Malmsten – Thomas
- Eva Henning – Sofi
- Hasse Ekman – Martin Grandé
- Stig Olin – Peter
- Irma Christenson – Linnéa
- Anders Henrikson – Paul
- Marianne Löfgren – Mrs. Bohlin
- Bibi Lindkvist – Anna
- Curt Masreliez – Alf
- Britta Holmberg – Birgitta's Mother in Dream (voice)

== Production ==
Producer Lorens Marmstedt agreed to finance the filming of Bergman's experimental screenplay, which the director said was in large part exploring the question, "Is earth Hell?" Filming, on a very low budget of approximately $30,000, took place over only 18 days, using an Expressionist style of cinematography; characterisation is minimal and the acting flat, in keeping with the emphasis on existential symbolism. At one point, in further distancing, Thomas and Birgitta watch a ridiculous silent film together.

== Reception ==
Stanley Kauffmann of The New Republic wrote- 'The picture is a bit tedious, except for the character of the pimp played by Stig Olin, but it is smoothly made and shows both fluency with the medium and an understanding of actors. It also forecasts the power of introspection that Bergman later developed so beautifully.'
