= Now That Night Is Near =

2019 book and song by Astrid Lindgren

- Author: Astrid Lindgren
- Original title: Alla ska sova
- Illustrator: Marit Törnqvist
- Language: Swedish
- Genre: Children's literature
- Publisher: Rabén & Sjögren
- Publication date: 2019
- Publication place: Sweden
- English publication date: 2021

Now That Night Is Near (original title: Alla ska sova) is a children's book written by Astrid Lindgren and illustrated by Marit Törnqvist. It includes Lindgren's song of the same name.

== Plot ==
On a Swedish summer evening, the reader follows a cat on a magical walk along some beautiful landscapes. The cat sees lambs and other small animals who would rather play than sleep. Only when twilight turns to night all animals seem to fall asleep. The cat also returns home and goes to sleep.

== Background ==
Astrid Lindgren originally wrote the song for the film The Children of Noisy Village. In the film, the girls sing two verses of the song when they spend the night in the hayloft. The music was composed by Georg Riedel.

When the artist Marit Törnqvist heard the song at Astrid Lindgren's funeral in 2002, she decided to create a picture book based on the lyrics.

In Sweden, the book was first published on April 30, 2019. A trailer was made to accompany the book's release. In the trailer, the images were animated by Marit Törnqvist and the melody of the song Alla ska sova was played. On June 29, an exhibition showing Törnqvist's illustrations opened at Astrid Lindgren's home Näs. Britta Persson performed the song at the Astrid Lindgren Conference in November; the pictures were presented by Marit Törnqvist.

== Reception ==
Marie Magnusson from Smålandsposten believes Now That Night Is Near is a charming book for toddlers who don't want to sleep.

Mariëlle Oussoren-Buys of Reformatorisch Dagblad praised Lindgren's poetic and sweet text, as well as Marit Törnqvist's dreamy illustrations.

Annette van der Plas from Nederlands Dagblad also praised the illustrations. She said the illustrations are all small paintings that she would also like to put onto her wall.

Gunilla Brodrej from Expressen opined that it almost seems as if the dew is literally rising out of the pictures. Törnqvist would depict the kind of landscape the reader would imagine as Astrid Lindgren's world. The color palette ranges from gold and ocher to lime blossom green and azure blue. It is particularly nice to show the children the book, while listening to the beautiful recording of the song. George Riedel created a melody for the song that would encourage the children to sing along. The song and book also remind Brodrej of her own childhood, when she did not want to sleep.

Kirkus Reviews praised the "beautifully illustrated" book, in which the "biracial family (...) counters prevailing stereotypes of rural farm families".
