= Stig Olin =

Swedish actor (1920–2008)

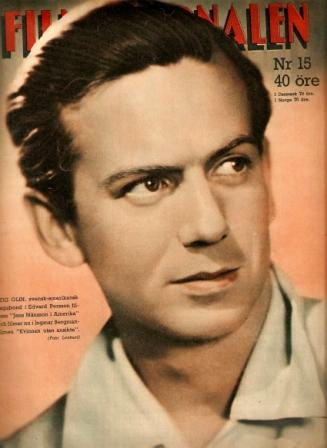
- Stig Olin in Filmjournalen, 1947.
- Born: Stig Högberg; 11 September 1920; Stockholm, Sweden
- Died: 28 June 2008 (aged 87); Stockholm, Sweden
- Occupations: Actor, theatre director, songwriter, singer
- Years active: 1941–1991
- Known for: The Word; Torment; Crisis; Flickan från tredje raden Klasskamrater
- Spouses: Britta Holmberg (m. 1944; div. 1980) Helena Kallenbäck (m. 1980; div. 1990)
- Children: 2, including Lena Olin

Stig Olin, né Högberg (11 September 1920 – 28 June 2008) was a Swedish actor, theatre director, songwriter and singer. He was the father of actress Lena Olin and singer Mats Olin (1947–2023). He was married to film actresses Britta Holmberg and Helena Kallenbäck.

== Career ==
=== Acting ===
Olin had a successful acting career, appearing in lead roles in a number of early Ingmar Bergman films, including Torment/Frenzy (Swedish: Hets) (1944; Bergman's script debut), Crisis (1946), Kvinna utan ansikte (Woman Without a Face) (1947; script by Bergman), Port of Call (1948), Eva (1948; script by Bergman), Prison (1949), To Joy (1950), Summer Interlude (1951), and Divorced (1951; script by Bergman).

Successful film roles also included a love struck student in the Sickan Carlsson film Klasskamrater (1952), Ernst in his own popular children's film Rasmus, Pontus och Toker (1956) and the scrubby old Potato-Algot in Jim och piraterna Blom (1987), directed by Hans Alfredson (from Hasse & Tage).

=== Film and play director ===
Olin then moved on to directing for both film and stage in the 1950s, 60s and 70s, focusing on comedies and musicals (including the original Swedish staging of Stephen Sondheim's A Little Night Music in 1978). In 1970 he became Director of Programmes at Swedish Radio, including the Swedish radio theatre, where he also directed a number of plays.

=== Songwriter ===
He was also a songwriter with En gång jag seglar i hamn, På söndag, Människors glädje, Jag tror på sommaren and Karusellvisan, a.o.

== Partial filmography ==
- Kronans käcka gossar (1940) - Military
- Bright Prospects (1941) - Bertil Bergström
- Tonight or Never (1941) - Young Man (scenes deleted)
- Goransson's Boy (1941) - Young man at Norr Mälarstrand (uncredited)
- The Fight Continues (1941) - Judge
- Stackars Ferdinand (1941) - Young man (scenes deleted)
- Prästen som slog knockout (1943) - Young Man (uncredited)
- The Sin of Anna Lans (1943) - Arne
- Young Blood (1943) - Pelle Persson
- Ordet (1943) - Anders
- Live Dangerously (1944) - Parachuting Saboteur
- The Invisible Wall (1944) - Worker (uncredited)
- Torment (1944) - Sandman - Student (uncredited)
- Oss tjuvar emellan eller En burk ananas (1945) - Gustav, young worker (uncredited)
- Tre söner gick till flyget (1945) - Olle - Familjen Hallman
- Två människor (1945) - Svenning (voice, uncredited)
- Crisis (1946) - Jack
- Johansson and Vestman (1946) - Rusan
- Incorrigible (1946) - Krister Sundbom
- The Balloon (1946) - Michael Kollinsky
- Jens Mansson in America (1947) - Johnny Andersson
- Woman Without a Face (1947) - Ragnar Ekberg
- Each to His Own Way (1948) - Fredrik Salén
- Port of Call (1948) - Thomas - Young Man in the Stairs (uncredited)
- Eva (1948) - Göran
- Dangerous Spring (1949) - Gustaf Eriksson
- Prison (1949) - Peter
- Flickan från tredje raden (1949) - Kalle Nilsson
- To Joy (1950) - Stig Eriksson
- Sånt händer inte här (1950) - The Young Man / narrator
- The Quartet That Split Up (1950) - Werner
- Summer Interlude (1951) - Ballet Master
- Frånskild (1951) - Hans
- One Fiancée at a Time (1952) - Jerker Nordin
- Classmates (1952) - Stig Andersson
- Farlig kurva (1952) - Tjoffe Käll
- Barabbas (1953) - Member of Barabbas' Gang
- Resan till dej (1953, director & writer with Hasse Ekman) - Messenger in Leather Jacket (uncredited)
- I dur och skur (1953, director)
- The Yellow Squadron (1954, director) - Boman
- The Magnificent Lie (1955) - Goronflot
- Mord, lilla vän (1955) - Dick Mattsson
- Whoops! (1955, director)
- Seventh Heaven (1956) - Berättarröst (voice, uncredited)
- Swing it, fröken (1956) - Singing Student (uncredited)
- Stage Entrance (1956) - Bernard Stensson
- Rasmus, Pontus och Toker (1956, director) - Ernst
- Sjunde himlen (1956, speaker)
- A Guest in His Own House (1957, writer & director)
- More Than a Match for the Navy (1958, director)
- Du är mitt äventyr (1958, director, writer Hasse Ekman & Stig Olin)
- Det svänger på slottet (1959, writer with Hasse Ekman)
- Jim och piraterna Blom (1987) - Potatis-Algot
- Vargens tid (1988) - Tiggaren
- Tre kärlekar (1991, TV Series) - Vicar
