= Eivor Landström =

Swedish actress

- Born: Harriet Eivor Emilie Landström; 22 March 1919; Stockholm, Sweden
- Died: 4 August 2004 (aged 85); Stockholm, Sweden
- Occupation: Actress
- Years active: 1937–1974

Harriet Eivor Emilie Landström (22 March 1919 – 4 August 2004) was a Swedish actress.

== Selected filmography ==
- Mother Gets Married (1937)
- Thunder and Lightning (1938)
- Life Begins Today (1939)
- Oh, What a Boy! (1939)
- They Staked Their Lives (1940)
- The Crazy Family (1940)
- Hanna in Society (1940)
- The Heavenly Play (1942)
- In Darkest Smaland (1943)
- Widower Jarl (1945)
- Life in the Finnish Woods (1947)
- Café Lunchrasten (1954)
- Luffaren och Rasmus (1955)
- People of the Finnish Forests (1955)
- Mästerdetektiven Blomkvist lever farligt (1957)
- Musik ombord (1958)
- Siska (1962)
