= The Truth Will Out =

Swedish mystery-thriller TV series

- Genre: Mystery-thriller
- Created by: Hans Jörnlind; Aron Levander
- Directed by: Kjell-Åke Andersson; Lisa Farzaneh
- Starring: Robert Gustafsson; Louise Peterhoff; Maria Langhammer; Christopher Wagelin
- Country of origin: Sweden
- Original language: Swedish
- No. of seasons: 2
- No. of episodes: 13

Production
- Producer: Søren Stærmose

Original release
- Network: Kanal 5
- Release: 21 August 2018 – 21 September 2021

The Truth Will Out (Swedish: Det som göms i snö, lit. 'what is hidden in snow') is a Swedish mystery-thriller TV series broadcast from 21 August 2018 on Kanal 5. It was created by Hans Jörnlind and Aron Levander, directed by Kjell-Åke Andersson and Lisa Farzaneh, produced by Søren Stærmose, and stars Robert Gustafsson in the lead role of police detective Peter Wendel. The series is based on ideas by Leif G. W. Persson. The first season, consisting of eight episodes, centres on Peter and his cold case unit, which re-examines several murders after a defence lawyer is killed. Peter's team members are Caijsa (Louise Peterhoff), Barbro (Maria Langhammer), and Jorma (Christopher Wagelin). A second season of five episodes was streamed from 19 September 2021 on Viaplay. Andersson and Farzaneh were joined by Camilla Ström as directors, while Persson, Levander, and Jörnlind continued as screenwriters. Gustafsson, Peterhoff, Langhammer, and Wagelin reprised their roles in the cold case unit. They contend with corruption within their police force and examine events surrounding the death of Peter's brother Urban.

== Synopsis ==
Season one

In 2017, detective inspector Peter Wendel returns to work after three years on sick leave. He still believes his older brother Urban was murdered five years before, while everyone else agrees that Urban committed suicide. Ulla appoints Peter as head of a cold case unit and assigns various misfits: Caijsa, who is being investigated by Internal Affairs after being accused of stealing; her accuser, Jorma, who is retraining as a real estate agent; and Barbro, who has no field experience. Ulla's assignment for Peter is to re-investigate murders by a confessed serial killer, Klas. His defence lawyer, Roland, is found murdered by Peter's knife, with a note attached claiming that Klas had lied. Peter's investigations stir problems for Björn, who had been attorney general and verified the convictions. Also annoyed by the reopened cases are Temo, the original investigating detective; Lena, Klas's psychotherapist; and Stefan, the prosecuting attorney. Peter's ex-wife, Ann-Marie, works for Björn, but her rival Marcus undermines her credibility. Peter suspects Mikael of killing Roland and putting the blame on a pedophile, Lars-Åke, who actually murdered one of Klas's victims. Peter loses credibility when his mental illness, whilst grieving for Urban, is revealed.

Season two

Set six months after the first season, Urban's colleague Conny confides to Peter that he was right about Urban's murder. Before Peter can learn more, Conny is shot dead. Meanwhile, Peter observes Ludvig steal evidence from Conny's flat. Ulla relocates Peter's unit to a dingy room. His team has further setbacks as Caijsa's pregnancy nears term and Jorma leaves to sell properties. They learn that Ludvig frequented underage prostitutes and was being blackmailed by Conny.

== Cast and characters ==
- Robert Gustafsson as Peter Wendel: detective inspector, heads cold case unit
- Louise Peterhoff as Caijsa Bergholm: detective, suspected thief investigated by Internal Affairs, usually paired with Jorma
- Maria Langhammer as Barbro Svensson: former archivist, often joins Peter for field investigations
- Christopher Wagelin as Jorma Virtanen: detective, wannabe real estate agent, shunned by colleagues for reporting Caijsa to Internal Affairs, usually paired with Caijsa
- Tyra Olin as Vera Wendel: Peter and Ann-Marie's teenage daughter, moves between her parents' homes
- Ingela Olsson as Ulla Ståhlnacke: detective chief inspector, Peter's boss
- Peter Gardiner as Ante Olofsson: Internal Affairs detective, Stella's second husband
- Cilla Thorell as Stella Olofsson: Urban's widow, Peter's sister-in-law, Jasmine's mother; later marries Ante. Runs clinic supporting sex workers
- Ville Virtanen as Eddie Eriksson: Linköping detective; helps investigate Mikael, becomes Barbro's love interest
- Ala Riani as Freshteh Laurell: Ulla's assistant
- Mimmi Cyon as Jasmine Wendel: Peter's niece, Vera's cousin and best friend
- Adrian Macéus as Urban Wendel (12 years old)/Young Urban's voice: Peter's older brother

=== Season one ===
- Maria Sundbom as Ann-Marie Wendel: Peter's ex-wife, Vera's mother, public prosecutor, Björn's chief of staff
- Johan Ulveson as Björn Stenius: justice minister, former attorney general; hires Ann-Marie
- Erik Johansson as Marcus Johansson: Björn's assistant, becomes rival of Ann-Marie
- Peter Carlberg as Mikael Ström: surveyor, murder suspect
- Thomas W. Gabrielsson as Temo Björkman: detective inspector who obtained Klas's confessions to multiple murders, which are re-investigated by Peter's team
- Annika Hallin as Lena Wahlberg: psychotherapist who treated Peter, Lars-Åke, Mikael, and Klas; she used the discredited recovered-memory therapy; later became a writer
- Anders Ahlbom Rosendahl as Stefan Kvarnholt: chief prosecutor during Klas's trials
- Isa Aouifia as Mats Hovfeldt: journalist
- Mattias Königsson as Lars-Åke Wall: convicted pedophile, murder suspect
- Eva Fritjofson as Kristina Svensson: retired Hallstavik policewoman, investigated Lars-Åke for murdering a child
- Zacharias Boustedt as Peter Wendel (9 years old): Urban's younger brother

=== Season two ===
- Samuel Fröler as Ludvig Larsson: police commissioner
- Inez Dahl Torhaug as Emelie Skoog: 14-year-old Vilan treatment center resident, also sex worker frequented by Ludvig
- Celie Sparre as Veronica: detective, leads Conny's murder investigation
- Julia Marko-Nord as Liselott: Jorma's long-term girlfriend
- Stefan Gödicke as Conny Berg: detective, previously on Urban's squad; murdered
- Alexandra Alegren as Jenny Eklund: former police cadet, then prostitute; knew Urban, Conny and Ludvig. Later works as a courier, Simon's mother
- Elias Haug as Simon Eklund: Jenny's son
  - also as Urban Wendel (11-year-old): Peter's older brother
- Kristina Paskeviciute as Nicole Hauglund: prostitute, murder victim dumped in a suitcase in Drevviken lake
- Katarina Weidhagen as Birgitta: Urban's landlady

== Production ==
Criminologist and writer Leif G. W. Persson provided the ideas for the show on "a couple of pages", which Hans Jörnlind and Aron Levander used to create The Truth Will Out. The action is set in Stockholm and rural Sweden with Jörnlind and Levander co-writing scripts. The storyline is influenced by the re-investigation of Sture Bergwall (a.k.a. Thomas Quick)'s murder convictions. Jörnlind has reflected that Bergwall's case was used as a backdrop, while the series focuses on "what happens when the justice system fails". According to Jörnlind, cold-case units comprising misfits were common when they were first formed in Sweden. The first season was produced by Søren Stærmose, with a budget of €6.8 million for eight episodes. Endemol Shine North America were working on an American adaptation in July 2020.

== Reception ==
The Guardian's Ellen E. Jones reviewed The Truth Will Out in March 2020 and compared it favorably with Nordic noir forerunners The Killing (2007), Borgen (2010), and The Bridge (2011), adding that the architecture "conforms to genre expectations", displaying "cool uncluttered premises of flustered suspects". Debit Enker of The Age describes Gustafsson's character (Peter) as "psychologically fragile", with behavior shifting from "impassive to aggressive", and his team as "off-beat... department discards".

Martin Howse of Entertainment Focus previewed season two: "a superb crime drama, brilliantly acted and creatively written. There are some welcome comic moments, too, which nicely counteract the solemnity. The Scandinavians do this sort of dark police procedural very well, and this is another top example."

== Episodes ==
=== Season one ===
No. overall	No. in season	Title	Directed by	Written by	Original release date
1	1	"Episode 1" (Avsnitt 1)	Kjell-Åke Andersson	Aron Levander, Hans Jörnlind, Leif G.W. Persson	21 August 2018
Flashback: Young Peter sees Urban's black eye. Present: Peter notices his patio door was left open. Roland phones Peter about a message left on his answering machine, but Peter did not phone Roland. Ulla tells Peter that no detectives want to join his unit. Stella rejects Peter's birthday gift, which is Urban's repaired watch. Roland is tasered and then stabbed with a knife. Björn appoints Ann-Marie as chief of staff. Jorma joins Peter's unit while studying to become a real estate agent. Caijsa joins pending Internal Affairs investigation after Jorma accused her of stealing. Temo's squad attends Roland's corpse. An attached note declares that Klas lied. Ulla displays murder weapon, which is similar to Peter's knife. She directs Peter's team to investigate Klas's convictions. Peter cannot find his knife, and his erratic behavior scares Vera. Peter describes Roland's call as a wrong number. He becomes upset over Ann-Marie working for Björn. They argue after hearing a radio report detailing Peter's investigations.
2	2	"Episode 2" (Avsnitt 2)	Kjell-Åke Andersson	Aron Levander, Hans Jörnlind, Leif G.W. Persson	28 August 2018
Temo demands Peter stop his investigations. Freshteh tells Ulla that Lars-Åke's DNA was found on the murder knife. Barbro provides Lars-Åke's profile—he was suspected of child murder in Hallstavik but released when Klas confessed. Peter directs Caijsa and Jorma to Hallstavik. Temo tells Björn that Peter took sick leave for mental illness. Björn orders Temo to find Roland's killer. Marcus exposes Ann-Marie as Peter's ex-wife, but Björn supports her integrity. Kristina, Caijsa, and Jorma visit corpse's location. Peter and Barbro search Roland's apartment. Kristina describes how evidence against Lars-Åke was ignored once Klas was accused. Peter collects photos of Roland, Björn, Lena, Temo, and Stefan. He deduces that the murderer observed Roland's apartment from neighboring building. As Peter goes there, Barbro describes suspect's apartment on fire. Upon entering, Peter is tasered. Barbro bumps into Mikael on stairs. Peter and Barbro find woman's corpse. Caijsa gets drunk and seduces Jorma. Temo's squad attend corpse. Temo queries Peter's explanations. Flashback: Young Peter runs through forest, holding a knife. Present: Vera burns Urban's belongings. In a TV interview, Stefan ridicule's Peter's team. Mikael phones Peter, posing as Lars-Åke, and asks whether Ulla knows about his knife.
3	3	"Episode 3" (Avsnitt 3)	Kjell-Åke Andersson	Aron Levander, Hans Jörnlind, Leif G.W. Persson	28 August 2018
Peter admits that the murder weapon was his knife. Caijsa and Jorma search Lars-Åke's home. Peter tells Temo about his knife being stolen. Peter assures Ulla he will handle the search for the killer. Both Caijsa and Jorma regret their sexual encounter. Stella asks Peter to get over Urban's death. Klas withdraws all his confessions. Temo attempts to undermine Peter's status with Barbro. Caijsa and Jorma visit Lena's book signing. Lena refuses to answer Mats's questions about Klas. Jorma asks whether Lars-Åke was Lena's client, but the latter cites patient confidentiality. Later, Caijsa and Jorma confront Lena, who claims Lars-Åke had social phobia and could not murder anyone. Caijsa counters that Lars-Åke killed Roland. Björn assures Ann-Marie that he approves of police scrutiny. Lars-Åke's shower drain is uncovered. Caijsa finds Lars-Åke's ceiling cache, which includes murdered child's photos. Local police knows the murdered child's parents. Marcus and Ann-Marie caution Björn that TV interviewer Eva may ask about Klas. Lena advises Peter to return to therapy and reminds him about threatening to kill Björn. Björn rebuffs Eva's inquiries and reiterates that Klas's convictions were sound. Mikael poses as Vera's online boyfriend. Eva challenges Björn about Lars-Åke's photos of the dead child. Björn rejects photos as evidence and walks out.
4	4	"Episode 4" (Avsnitt 4)	Kjell-Åke Andersson	Aron Levander, Hans Jörnlind, Leif G.W. Persson	4 September 2018
To counter photographic evidence, Björn claims that Klas conspired with Lars-Åke. Temo arrests another criminal for Roland's murder. Peter points out that Temo was wrong about Hallstavik murder. Temo counters that Björn verified all those convictions. Peter attempts to confront Björn, but Ann-Marie shuffles him away. Marcus overhears Ann-Marie ask Peter to email her. Caijsa wonders why Lars-Åke left his cache behind. Caijsa deploys a cadaver dog, which discovers Lars-Åke's corpse. Björn, Stefan, and Temo insist that all convictions stand, despite Ann-Marie's objection. Ann-Marie realises that Marcus accessed her emails. Caijsa informs Peter that Lars-Åke could not have killed Roland. The child's father is arrested for Lars-Åke's murder. Flashback: Young Peter stands near his father with a knife. Present: Peter and Barbro question Mikael, who claims to have seen Lars-Åke. Ann-Marie reads Peter's old emails, including death threats against Björn. Ann-Marie apologises to Björn. Peter and Barbro stake out Mikael's home. After his team confers, Peter asks Mikael to come in for questioning about Roland's murder. Marcus reads Peter's death threat. Ann-Marie advises Björn that Lars-Åke's death may become problematic. The child's mother is interviewed on TV, and she rails against the legal system's handling of her child's murder.
5	5	"Episode 5" (Avsnitt 5)	Kjell-Åke Andersson, Lisa Farzaneh	Aron Levander, Hans Jörnlind, Leif G.W. Persson	11 September 2018
After Peter describes Lars-Åke's corpse, Mikael retracts his statement. Marcus finds an unsigned death threat letter, which matches Peter's email. Ulla and Temo order Peter to release Mikael due to insufficient evidence. Barbro and Peter tail Mikael to hardware store. When Jorma arrives, he is sent inside. Marcus shows letter to Björn and Ann-Marie and claims Peter wrote it. When challenged, Marcus is unable to verify this. Caijsa and Jorma stake out Mikael's home. Caijsa answers Ante's call and claims it's her word against Jorma's. Caijsa and Jorma argue about the theft. Ann-Marie informs Peter that Marcus and Björn have his letter after Marcus hacked her emails. Flashback: Peter's father is recovering in the hospital; the critically injured Urban is in a nearby room. Present: Mikael approaches Vera as Peter's friend and drives her home; she leaves her scarf. Marcus hands letter and email to Temo. Mikael's former boss informs Barbro that Mikael inexplicably missed a week's work. Barbro matches date with Klas's sentencing for Österbymo girl's murder. Peter surmises Mikael killed the girl. Ulla suspends Peter for his death threat against Björn. Mikael builds cage-like device.
6	6	"Episode 6" (Avsnitt 6)	Kjell-Åke Andersson, Lisa Farzaneh	Aron Levander, Hans Jörnlind, Leif G.W. Persson	18 September 2018
Peter stakes out Mikael's home. Eddie meets Barbro in Österbymo and describes Viveka's disappearance. She was home alone, while her neighbor Eva was overseas. Viveka's boots were found at bus stop. Temo's suspect is released after his alibi was confirmed. Caijsa and Jorma continue investigating Mikael. Ann-Marie sets her phone to record Stefan and Björn's meeting. Jorma continues stakeout. Eddie was dissatisfied with Klas's erroneous description of Viveca. Eddie points out Viveca's former boyfriend Jonas. Jonas attacks Barbro; she headbutts him. Barbro determines that a witness saw a light in Eva's house. Jorma photographs cartons delivered to Mikael. Stefan justifies adding a document from another case to support his claim that Klas was Lars-Åke's accomplice. Mikael invites Peter inside his home. Peter asserts that Mikael was living with Gunvor in 1968 and that Mikael wants control over how Viveka's remembered. He phones Lena, but she refuses to acknowledge treating Mikael. Temo orders uniformed police to collect Peter from Mikael's street.
7	7	"Episode 7" (Avsnitt 7)	Kjell-Åke Andersson, Lisa Farzaneh	Aron Levander, Hans Jörnlind, Leif G.W. Persson	25 September 2018
Flashback: Peter, yelling, accuses Lena of conspiring with Björn. Present: Upon learning of Lena's disappearance, Peter and Barbro search Mikael's garage and find Lena's car. They then discover a room-sized diorama of Mikael's forest photo. Ann-Marie hands USB to Mats and resigns. Ulla reinstates Peter. Lena's last call was to Temo, who divulged Mikael's address. Ante collects Caijsa for her suspension. Mats asks Stefan to comment on audio of evidence tampering. Mikael's safe contains photos of Viveka and older ones of his then-girlfriend, Viveka's mother. Ulla reports that Mikael chatted online with Vera. Peter traces Jasmine's phone. Vera describes encountering Mikael and forgetting her scarf. Barbro learns Mikael has a postal box. Ante releases Caijsa when Jorma withdraws his accusation. Peter tells Vera about Stig beating him and Urban. Peter stabbed Stig, who nearly killed Urban in retaliation. Peter feels guilty for not preventing Urban's suicide. Marcus slaps Ann-Marie, who strikes him back. Freshteh mentions that Mikael built something, which turns out to be a portable incinerator. Caisja displays postal box evidence that Mikael targeted the justice ministry. As Ann-Marie finishes packing, Mikael arrives. While Peter's team search for Mikael, they learn that Björn is missing.
8	8	"Episode 8" (Avsnitt 8)	Kjell-Åke Andersson, Lisa Farzaneh	Aron Levander, Hans Jörnlind, Leif G.W. Persson	9 October 2018
A farmer follows documents into a bloodied barn. Peter addresses full squad regarding Björn's abduction. The police have lost Mikael's trail. Caijsa asks about Lena; Peter suspects Mikael took her, too. Eddie directs search of Eva's home; Barbro arrives. Marcus is questioned by the Swedish Security Service (SÄPO). Jorma directs Peter to incinerator's discovery. Near the barn, Peter finds Lena, severely injured and incoherent. Peter ignores Mats' questions about Björn. Björn's phone pings inside police station, on which Mikael recorded a video showing shoes on a roadway. Jorma explains about Viveka's boots: this is Mikael's message that corpses will never be found. Ulla holds press conference; Peter's team hands investigation to SÄPO. Barbro finds Viveka's blood under Eva's floorboards. Peter visits Lena in hospital. She speculates that Mikael approached Peter because of their similarities. Barbro and Eddie kiss. Caijsa explains why she stole money. When Peter arrives home, Mikael is sitting there. Peter arrests him and asks about the corpses, but Mikael refuses to reveal their location. Caijsa tells Jorma she's pregnant but then says it was a joke. Peter returns to Mikael's home and checks his atlas for indentations. Peter discovers Mikael's forest clearing.

=== Season two ===
No. overall	No. in season	Title	Directed by	Written by	Original release date
9	1	"Episode 1" (Avsnitt 1)	Kjell-Åke Andersson, Lisa Farzaneh, Camilla Ström	Aron Levander, Hans Jörnlind, Leif G.W. Persson	21 September 2021
Peter has a nightmare of young Urban committing suicide. After six months, Jorma has not been replaced. Caijsa works on Nicole's murder. Peter attends Urban's memorial with Ante and Conny while wearing Urban's watch. Conny confides that Peter was right about Urban's death. He is later struck by a car and kidnapped. When the driver stops, Conny limps out, clutching his phone, and is shot dead. Vera reminds Peter that she's starting work experience. Jorma chats with Ludvig, who stands near Emelie. Ulla directs Peter to Conny's home. Ante introduces Veronica, who directs Peter to discover why Conny had cold case files. Ludvig arrives, monitoring the search. Peter sees Ludvig steal evidence. Jorma rejoins the unit. Caijsa confirms that she's carrying his baby. Freshteh reports how Conny was killed. Conny's phone is missing, but his second SIM card contains two numbers: "LL" and Jenny. Emelie seeks money from Stella's clinic. Jenny ignores Caijsa and Jorma's knocking on her door. Using the SIM card, Peter confirms that "LL" is Ludvig.
10	2	"Episode 2" (Avsnitt 2)	Kjell-Åke Andersson, Lisa Farzaneh, Camilla Ström	Aron Levander, Hans Jörnlind, Leif G.W. Persson	21 September 2021
Peter and Barbro photograph Ludvig meeting Emelie. Ludvig receives oral sex from her. Liselott congratulates Caijsa on her pregnancy. Peter retrieves Conny's damaged USB from Ludvig's unlocked car. Emelie meets Stella but leaves after Stella mentions reporting to the police. While visiting a prisoner, Jorma and Caijsa learn that Conny had blackmailed Nicole's murderer. Peter encounters Ulla and Vera, who are having lunch with Ludvig. A bully, Sarah assaults Emelie at Vilan treatment center. Bernt admits to providing Conny with cold case files; Conny had also taken Urban's file. Back at Conny's flat, Peter finds partial photo of Urban's corpse. He believes the killer took the rest of the file. Emelie sees Ludvig's car outside the center. Emelie's supervisor prevents her leaving. Ludvig video calls Emelie: orders her to strip while he masturbates. Barbro urges Peter to report Ludvig to Ulla and Ante. Peter counters that they have insufficient evidence to indict a police commissioner. Peter reads Ludvig's note referencing Vilan but encounters Veronica upon leaving Ludvig's office. Sarah threatens to cut Emelie's finger off. Peter replays Conny's call for Stella and Ante: Conny says that Peter was right. They hear a rifle shot. Emelie jumps out of a window.
11	3	"Episode 3" (Avsnitt 3)	Kjell-Åke Andersson, Lisa Farzaneh, Camilla Ström	Aron Levander, Hans Jörnlind, Leif G.W. Persson	21 September 2021
Caijsa studies Nicole's case files as Jorma tails Ludvig. Veronica reports Peter's presence in Ludvig's office to Ulla and Ante. Stella informs Ante about Emelie's prostitution. At Urban's former apartment, Peter matches Urban's photo with Birgitta's flooring. Peter describes photos of Ludvig frequenting a prostitute and of stealing Conny's USB. Barbro explains how Conny obtained case files. Eddie enters with repaired USB and urges them to watch the video it contains. Emelie asks Ludvig for money; she's willing to do anything. The video depicts Ludvig having brutal sex with Nicole in 2005. She repeatedly begs him to stop. Stella tries to convince Emelie to talk, but Emelie goes to meet Ludvig. Ante tells Ulla about Emelie. Peter and Caijsa lose Ludvig's car. Jorma reports that Emelie is missing from Vilan. Barbro views traffic cameras. Ludvig picks up Emelie and sees she's been beaten. He books a hotel room and readies his bag of sex toys and torture devices. Barbro alerts Caijsa to Ludvig's presence at the hotel. Peter and Caijsa enter the hotel room to rescue Emelie and arrest Ludvig. Caijsa confirms it is Nicole in the video.
12	4	"Episode 4" (Avsnitt 4)	Kjell-Åke Andersson, Lisa Farzaneh, Camilla Ström	Aron Levander, Hans Jörnlind, Leif G.W. Persson	21 September 2021
Caijsa reviews Nicole's case for Ulla and Peter's team. Nicole had been severely beaten, strangled to death, and then stuffed in a suitcase. Ludvig claims Emelie said she was 18, and they had consensual sex. After seeing the video, Ludvig claims Nicole consented to rough sex. He does not know where they were filmed and denies killing her. Jorma and Freshteh query Ludvig's wife. Freshteh collects Ludvig's rifle. Ludvig admits that Conny was blackmailing him and that he stole the USB but denies killing Conny. Peter accuses Ludvig of murdering Urban; Ludvig laughs. Peter and Barbro interview Jenny. She recalls meeting Urban and Conny years earlier. Conny had recently asked whether Jenny recognised Ludvig. Jenny blames Ludvig for her scars from 2012 but refuses to testify. Jorma is unable to match any of Ludvig's items to Nicole's wounds. Aboard Conny's boat, Barbro finds his camera, while Peter discovers videotapes: one shows Ante setting the camera. Rather than return to Vilan, Stella takes Emelie to meet Jasmine and Vera. Stella's records show that Nicole appeared at the clinic after Ludvig's assault—he did not kill her. Jorma confesses to Liselott that he impregnated Caijsa.
13	5	"Episode 5" (Avsnitt 5)	Kjell-Åke Andersson, Lisa Farzaneh, Camilla Ström	Aron Levander, Hans Jörnlind, Leif G.W. Persson	21 September 2021
Urban's corpse had been discovered by Ante. Peter and Barbro arrest him. Jorma and the police search Stella's home. Ante refuses to answer Peter's questions; Ulla stops the interview. Peter matches Urban's watch to Nicole's wounds. Birgitta's older wallpaper is the same as that seen in the videos. Emelie describes being bullied, which was dismissed as self-harming. Barbro tells Ante that Urban killed Nicole. Ante admits to working with Urban and Conny to blackmail the customers of prostitutes. Ludvig was a rich prize, but Ante claims he did not know of his violent assaults. The team listens to Conny's phone call again, which suggests his killer was a police cadet. They learn Jenny had been on Urban's squad. Jenny runs off as police arrive at her home. Peter, with Ante present, finds Conny's phone and Urban's file in Jenny's home. Jenny shoots and injures Ante and Jorma. Peter convinces Jenny to surrender. She reveals that Urban had raped her. She admits to killing Urban and Conny.
