= Helena Kallenbäck =

Swedish actress (born 1943)

- Born: 26 November 1944 (age 81); Finspång, Sweden
- Occupation: Actress
- Years active: 1972–2009
- Spouse: Stig Olin (m. 1980; div. 1990)

Asta Helena Kallenbäck (born 26 November 1944) is a Swedish actress. She was married to actor Stig Olin. In 1989 she received a Guldmasken.

== Selected filmography ==
- 1972 – Kvartetten som sprängdes (TV)
- 1981 – Babels hus (TV)
- 1989 – Tre kärlekar (TV)
- 1994 – Läckan (TV)
- 1994 – Kan du vissla Johanna?
- 1994 – Snoken (TV)
- 1996 – Tre Kronor (TV series)
- 2000 – Vita hästen (TV)
- 2000 – Låt stå! (TV)
- 2009 – Wallander – Prästen
