= Broken Hill Blues =

- Directed by: Sofia Norlin
- Written by: Sofia Norlin
- Produced by: Olivier Guerpillon
- Starring: Sebastian Hiort af Ornas; Lina Leandersson; Alfred Juntti
- Cinematography: Petrus Sjovik
- Edited by: Nicolas Bancilhon; Philip Bergstrom
- Music by: Conny Nimmersjö; Anna-Karin Unger
- Release date: December 6, 2013
- Running time: 80 minutes
- Country: Sweden
- Language: Swedish

Broken Hill Blues (also titled Omheten and Tenderness) is a 2013 Swedish drama film written and directed by Sofia Norlin and starring Sebastian Hiort af Ornas, Lina Leandersson and Alfred Juntti. It is Norlin's feature directorial debut.

== Cast ==
- Sebastian Hiort af Ornas as Markus
- Alfred Juntti as Daniel
- Lina Leandersson as Zerin
- Jenny Sandberg as Helena
- Ella Nordin as Emma
- Par Andersson as Daniel's Father
- Alexandra Dahlström as Teacher

== Release ==
The film was released in Sweden on December 6, 2013.

== Reception ==
Ronnie Scheib of Variety gave the film a positive review and wrote, "But Norlin’s compelling imagery weaves its own hypnotic throughline, marking her as a director to watch."

Leslie Felperin of The Hollywood Reporter gave the film a negative review and wrote, "This austere teen-centric drama marks out its first-time director Sofia Norlin as a promising voice, but she needs to work on story skills."
