= Astro: An Urban Fable in a Magical Rio de Janeiro =

2012 film directed by Paula Trabulsi

- Directed by: Paula Trabulsi
- Written by: Jeffis Carvalho; Malu Tavares
- Produced by: Paula Trabulsi
- Starring: Alexandra Dahlström; Verônica Debom; Regina Duarte; Odilon Wagner; Cláudio Cavalcanti; Gabi Brites
- Edited by: Marcio Canella
- Music by: Hildur Guðnadóttir
- Production company: Bossa Nova Films
- Distributed by: Elo Company
- Release date: November 2, 2012
- Running time: 85 minutes
- Country: Brazil
- Languages: Portuguese; English

Astro: An Urban Fable in a Magical Rio de Janeiro (Portuguese: Astro, Uma Fábula Urbana em um Rio de Janeiro Mágico) is a 2012 Brazilian adventure-drama film directed by Paula Trabulsi.

The film is part of a project that involves visual art, street culture, cuisine and urban interventions.

== Plot ==
Daughter of a Brazilian mother and Swedish father, Astro leaves her life in Sweden to visit Rio de Janeiro. She travels to the city to get a house that she had inherited, but ends up getting longer than expected. Eventually, she ends up meeting Alice and her group of friends, starting to interact more with the city.

== Music ==
- "Rain-Bow" - AlbiNOI
- "Off Pictures" - AlbiNOI
- "Broken Monitors" - Bernhard Fleischmann
- "Corra e Olhe o Céu" - Cartola
- "Haps" - Duo 505
- "Our Thing" - Evan Voytas
- "I Have a Dream in my Heart" - Evan Voytas
- "Aether" - Hildur Guðnadóttir
- "Ascent" - Hildur Guðnadóttir
- "Gunnera" - Isan
- "Channel Ten" - Isan
- "One More Year" - Channel Ten
- "Pianosong Two" - Channel Ten
- "A. Klingtmann" - Channel Ten
- "Plokk" - Channel Ten
- "Flock" - Channel Ten
- "Bit My Leg Off" - Tsukimono
- "Sofi is Sad" - Tsukimono
