= Curt Masreliez =

Swedish actor

- Born: 19 July 1919; Gothenburg, Sweden
- Died: 21 June 1979 (aged 59)
- Occupation: Actor
- Years active: 1939-1973

Curt Masreliez (19 July 1919 – 21 June 1979) was a Swedish stage and film actor. He appeared in more than 50 films and television shows between 1939 and 1973. Masreliez worked at the Royal Dramatic Theatre as well as the theatres in Helsingborg, Malmö, Uppsala, and Gothenburg. His work in a 1965 production of Marat/Sade by Peter Weiss was critically acclaimed.

== Selected filmography ==
- Lasse-Maja (1941)
- Adventurer (1942)
- The Case of Ingegerd Bremssen (1942)
- Eaglets (1944)
- Count Only the Happy Moments (1944)
- Crime in the Sun (1947)
- I Love You Karlsson (1947)
- Prison (1949)
- Young Summer (1954)
- Mord, lilla vän (1955)
- Woman in a Fur Coat (1958)
- The Jazz Boy (1958)
- Only a Waiter (1959)
- Rififi in Stockholm (1961)
- Lovely Is the Summer Night (1961)
- Emil och griseknoen (1973)
