= Tove Edfeldt =

Swedish actress (born 1983)

- Born: 1983 (age 42–43)
- Occupation: Actress
- Years active: 1986–present

Tove Edfeldt (born 1983) is a Swedish actress. She studied at the Swedish National Academy of Mime and Acting between 2004 and 2008.

She appeared in a Dansens hus, Stockholm production of Fiddler on the Roof in 2019.

== Filmography ==
- 1986 – The Children of Noisy Village
- 1987 – More About the Children of Noisy Village
- 1993 – Roseanna
- 1997 – Sanning eller konsekvens
- 2000 – Barnen på Luna (TV)
- 2001 – Eva & Adam - fyra födelsedagar och ett fiasko
- 2003 – Hannah med H
- 2011 – The Stig-Helmer Story
- 2018 - Ted – För kärlekens skull
