= Amors Baller =

- Directed by: Kristoffer Metcalfe
- Written by: Kristoffer Metcalfe; Frederick Howard; Peder Fuglerud; Stian A. Eriksen
- Produced by: Frederick Howard
- Starring: Kåre Hedebrant; Eira K. Stuedahl
- Production company: SF Norge
- Distributed by: SF Norge
- Release date: 25 March 2011
- Country: Norway
- Languages: Norwegian; Swedish
- Budget: NOK 13.5 million

Amors Baller (English: Cupid's Balls) is a Norwegian teenage comedy film directed by Kristoffer Metcalfe, starring Kåre Hedebrant and Eira K. Stuedahl. The film was co-written by Metcalfe and producer Frederick Howard. The film premiered in Norway on 25 March 2011.

== Plot ==
Fifteen-year-old Lucas moves from Stockholm, Sweden, to a small town in Norway. He falls in love with Susanne, the goalkeeper of the local girls' football team. To win her love, he joins the boys' football team to participate in the Norway Cup, a large tournament held in Oslo. However, Lucas realizes things will be more difficult than he initially thought, because Susanne already has a boyfriend. At the same time, he has to fight for a position on the first team.

== Cast ==
- Kåre Hedebrant as Lucas
- Eira K. Stuedahl as Susanne
- Isak Nikolai Iveland Solli as Petter
- Jana Opsahl
- Fridtjov Såheim
- Harald Weedon

== Production ==
Amors Baller has a budget of around 13.5 million Norwegian kroner. It was financed without funding from the Norwegian Film Institute.

The screenplay was developed by Kristoffer Metcalfe and Frederick Howard, alongside Peder Fuglerud and Stian A. Eriksen. According to Howard, they wanted to make a "classic coming-of-age story in colorful packaging, where friendship, love and athletic ambition collide in a fireworks display of a movie with and for youth." Director Kristoffer Metcalfe described it as a "youth film, 'boy meets girl' set in a football environment."

Metcalfe expressed his satisfaction with securing "such an experienced and skilled young actor" as Kåre Hedebrant, known for his performance in Let the Right One In, in the leading role. "This feels much easier [than Let the Right One In]. The atmosphere is lighter, also away from the camera," Hedebrant told Aftenposten. Many other roles were filled by actors without prior experience. Eira K. Stuedahl, who plays the "dream girl" Susanna, was stopped in the street and invited to audition. Howard emphasized that he wanted to give the actors a lot of leeway, and freedom to improvise. Harald Weedon, who plays Lucas' sex-obsessed friend, came up with the title of the film, "Amors Baller" (literally: "Cupid's Balls").

Filming started on 12 July 2010 in Oslo, and is planned to conclude on 20 August. The entire film will be shot in and around Oslo, mainly in Ekeberg, Bekkelaget and Ljan, and will include scenes shot at the 2010 Norway Cup, one of the world's largest football tournaments. It premiered on 25 March 2011.
