= Eva & Adam (TV series) =

- Genre: Drama - Family
- Created by: Måns Gahrton, Johan Unenge
- Starring: Ellen Fjæstad; Carl-Robert Holmer-Kårell; Ulrika Bergman; Erik Johansson; Anki Larsson; Magnus Nilsson; Pablo Martinez
- Countries of origin: Sweden; Denmark
- Original language: Swedish
- No. of seasons: 2
- No. of episodes: 16

Production
- Producer: Svensk Filmindustri (SF) Sveriges Television (SVT)
- Production location: Stockholm (Liljeholmen)
- Running time: 28 minutes

Original release
- Network: SVT Drama
- Release: January 31, 1999 – April 15, 2001

Eva & Adam (Eva och Adam) is a Swedish TV series consisting of two seasons. The original airdate for the first episode was 30 January 1999.

The show is about a boy, Adam Kieslowski, and a girl, Eva Strömdahl. Adam has Polish ancestry; his father is Polish. Eva is a Swedish girl. The two children live in Liljeholmen, a district of the Swedish capital Stockholm. During the show, Eva and Adam fall in love. Sometimes there are obstacles, but after a while (mostly in the second season) a true love has developed. Other storylines in the show include friendship and bullying.

The show is based on the comic books with the same name. There was also a successful feature film made, called Eva & Adam – fyra födelsedagar och ett fiasko (Eva & Adam: Four Birthdays and a Fiasco).

== Adam Kieslowski ==
Adam Kieslowski is played by Carl-Robert Holmer-Kårell.

Adam's father was born in Poland. In the first season, Adam is 12 years old, in the second season he is 13 years old and in the movie he is 14 years old.. Adam does not have any siblings.

== Eva Strömdahl ==
Eva Strömdahl is played by Ellen Fjaestad.

Eva lives with her parents and her two brothers in a house. Just like Adam, Eva is 12 in the first season, in the second season she is 13 and in the movie she is 14.

== Other characters ==
- Tobbe Strömdahl
- Annika
- Alexander

== Broadcast history ==
Eva & Adam has been broadcast in Scandinavia, Germany (Kika) and the Netherlands (Z@pp).

== Sources ==
- https://www.imdb.com/name/nm0391732/
- Eva & Adam Central (Fansite)
- Eva och Adam (Strips)
