= Rebecka Liljeberg =

Swedish former actress (born 1981)

- Born: 13 May 1981 (age 45); Nykvarn, Sweden
- Education: Karolinska Institute
- Occupations: Physician; former actress
- Years active: 1991–2002
- Children: 3

Rebecka Liljeberg (born 13 May 1981) is a Swedish former actress who starred in the Swedish film Show Me Love (Fucking Åmål) (1998).

== Early life and career ==
She was born on 13 May 1981 in Nykvarn, Sweden. Her mother is Swedish and her father is Finnish. Her parents divorced when she was one year old. As a child, she acted at Vår teater, a children's theatre in Stockholm. At the age of nine, Liljeberg won a role in the series Sunes jul. Between 1993 and 1997, she continued in amateur theatre until landing a role in the film Närkontakt later in 1997. The following year, she got her breakthrough in the Lukas Moodysson film Show Me Love (Fucking Åmål) (1998). She quit high school to make the film, which ultimately won her the 1999 Guldbagge Awards for best actress, together with Alexandra Dahlström.

After her roles in Fucking Åmål and Sherdil, Liljeberg began an adult education course in order to graduate from high school. While studying, she also starred in the relatively successful arthouse film Bear's Kiss which was her first and only English-speaking film and dubbed a character in the Swedish version of the IMAX 3D movie T-Rex: Back to the Cretaceous. In 2002, she completed the adult education course, and went on to study medicine at the Karolinska Institutet in Stockholm, one of the largest medical universities in Europe.

== Personal life ==
Liljeberg stopped acting after her film Bear's Kiss (2002) and now works as a doctor after completing her residency at Södersjukhuset in Stockholm. She lives in Stockholm. Even though it has been a while since Liljeberg stopped acting, her patients sometimes recognize her.

== Filmography ==
- (1991) Sunes jul (television series)
- (1997) Närkontakt (short film)
- (1998) Längtans blåa blomma (television series)
- (1998) Show Me Love (Swedish: Fucking Åmål)
- (1998) Lithivm (only production assistant)
- (1999) Där regnbågen slutar
- (1999) Sherdil
- (1999-2000) Eva & Adam (television series)
- (2000) Skärgårdsdoktorn (television series)
- (2000) Födelsedagen
- (2002) Bear's Kiss

== Awards and nominations ==
Year	Award	Category	Nominee(s)	Result	Ref.
1999	Guldbagge Awards	Best Actress in a Leading Role	Rebecka Liljeberg	Won	
