= The Children of Noisy Village (film) =

- Poster art for the TV series
- Directed by: Lasse Hallström
- Written by: Astrid Lindgren
- Based on: The Six Bullerby Children novels by Astrid Lindgren
- Produced by: Waldemar Bergendahl
- Starring: Linda Bergström; Crispin Dickson Wendenius; Henrik Larsson; Ellen Demérus; Anna Sahlin; Harald Lönnbro
- Cinematography: Jens Fischer
- Edited by: Susanne Linnman
- Music by: Georg Riedel
- Distributed by: AB Svensk Filmindustri
- Release date: 6 December 1986 (Sweden)
- Running time: 90 minutes
- Country: Sweden
- Language: Swedish

The Children of Noisy Village (Swedish: Alla vi barn i Bullerbyn) is a Swedish film which was released to cinemas in Sweden on 6 December 1986, directed by Lasse Hallström, based on the books about The Six Bullerby Children by Astrid Lindgren.

A sequel, More About the Children of Noisy Village, premiered the following year. Both films were later reworked into a seven-episode TV-series that was broadcast in 1989.

== Cast ==
- Linda Bergström as Lisa
- Crispin Dickson Wendenius as Lasse
- Henrik Larsson as Bosse
- Ellen Demérus as Britta
- Anna Sahlin as Anna
- Harald Lönnbro as Olle
- Tove Edfeldt as Kerstin

== Soundtrack ==
The instrumental music was composed by Georg Riedel. Astrid Lindgren wrote the lyrics to the songs Now That Night Is Near (Alla ska sova) and Falukorvsvisan. Other songs sung in the film are old Swedish folk or children's songs.
