= Kåre Hedebrant =

Swedish actor (born 1995)

- Born: Kåre Gillis Hedebrant; 28 June 1995 (age 30); Stockholm, Sweden
- Occupation: Actor
- Years active: 2005–present

Kåre Hedebrant (born 28 June 1995) is a Swedish actor.

== Early life ==
He grew up in Hässelby, near Stockholm. Hedebrant attended Kungsholmens Gymnasium's Choir Section, and during middle school he attended the Adolf Fredrik's Music School.

== Career ==
In 2005, he played the title role of Emil in Emil i Lönneberga, a theatrical production based on the popular children's novels by Astrid Lindgren.

In 2007, after an open casting involving 4,000 children, Hedebrant was chosen to play the role of Oskar in Let the Right One In.

Oskar, the protagonist of the film, is a 12-year-old bullied boy who strikes up a friendship with the mysterious Eli (Lina Leandersson), who later turns out to be a vampire. Hedebrant received generally positive notices for his role. According to If magazine's reviewer, "Hedebrant does a fine job of conveying the boy's silent longing, rage and defiance". James Berardinelli considered him an "interesting choice to play Oskar", and noted that he "effectively makes the character seem remote, withdrawn, and a little creepy". According to Hedebrant, "[e]ven the bully scenes weren't hard to shoot because I got on very well with both guys ... [t]he main problem was that it was so cold!"

He received a nomination for "Best Performance in an International Feature Film – Leading Young Performers" (with Lina Leandersson), in the 30th Annual Young Artist Awards. Other nominations include "Breakthrough Performer" from the Online Film Critics Society Awards 2008 (won by Lina Leandersson), and "Best Actor" in the 2009 Fangoria Chainsaw Awards (won by Ron Perlman).

In 2010, Hedebrant was chosen as the lead role in Amors Baller, a Norwegian romantic comedy directed by Kristoffer Metcalfe. Hedebrant plays Lucas, a Swedish teenager who moves to a small Norwegian town, and falls in love with the goalkeeper on the local girls football team. The film premiered in Norway on 25 March 2011. In 2012, he played the role of Tobias in the Swedish sci-fi drama series Real Humans.

== Filmography ==
Year	Title	Role	Notes
2008	Let the Right One In	Oskar	Nominated—BAFTA Award for Best Film Not in the English Language; Boston Society of Film Critics Award for Best Foreign Language Film; BIFA for Best Foreign Independent Film; Nominated—Broadcast Film Critics Association Award for Best Foreign Language Film; Florida Film Critics Circle Award for Best Foreign Language Film; Nominated—Goya Award for Best European Film; Kansas City Film Critics Circle Award for Best Foreign Language Film; Online Film Critics Society Award for Best Foreign Language Film; Nominated—Online Film Critics Society Award for Best Breakthrough Performance (by Kåre Hedebrant); Phoenix Film Critics Society Award for Best Foreign Language Film; San Diego Film Critics Society Award for Best Foreign Language Film; San Francisco Film Critics Circle Award for Best Foreign Language Film; Saturn Award for Best International Film; Southeastern Film Critics Association Award for Best Foreign Language Film; Toronto Film Critics Association Award for Best Foreign Language Film
2011	Amors Baller	Lucas	

== Awards and nominations ==
Year	Award	Category	Work	Result
2008	Online Film Critics Society Awards	Best Breakthrough Performance (won by Lina Leandersson)	Let the Right One In	Nominated
2009	Young Artist Awards	Best Performance in an International Feature Film – Leading Young Performers (with Lina Leandersson)	Let the Right One In	Nominated
2009	Fangoria Chainsaw Awards	Best Actor (won by Lina Leandersson)	Let the Right One In	Nominated
