= Lina Leandersson =

Iranian-Swedish actress (born 1995)

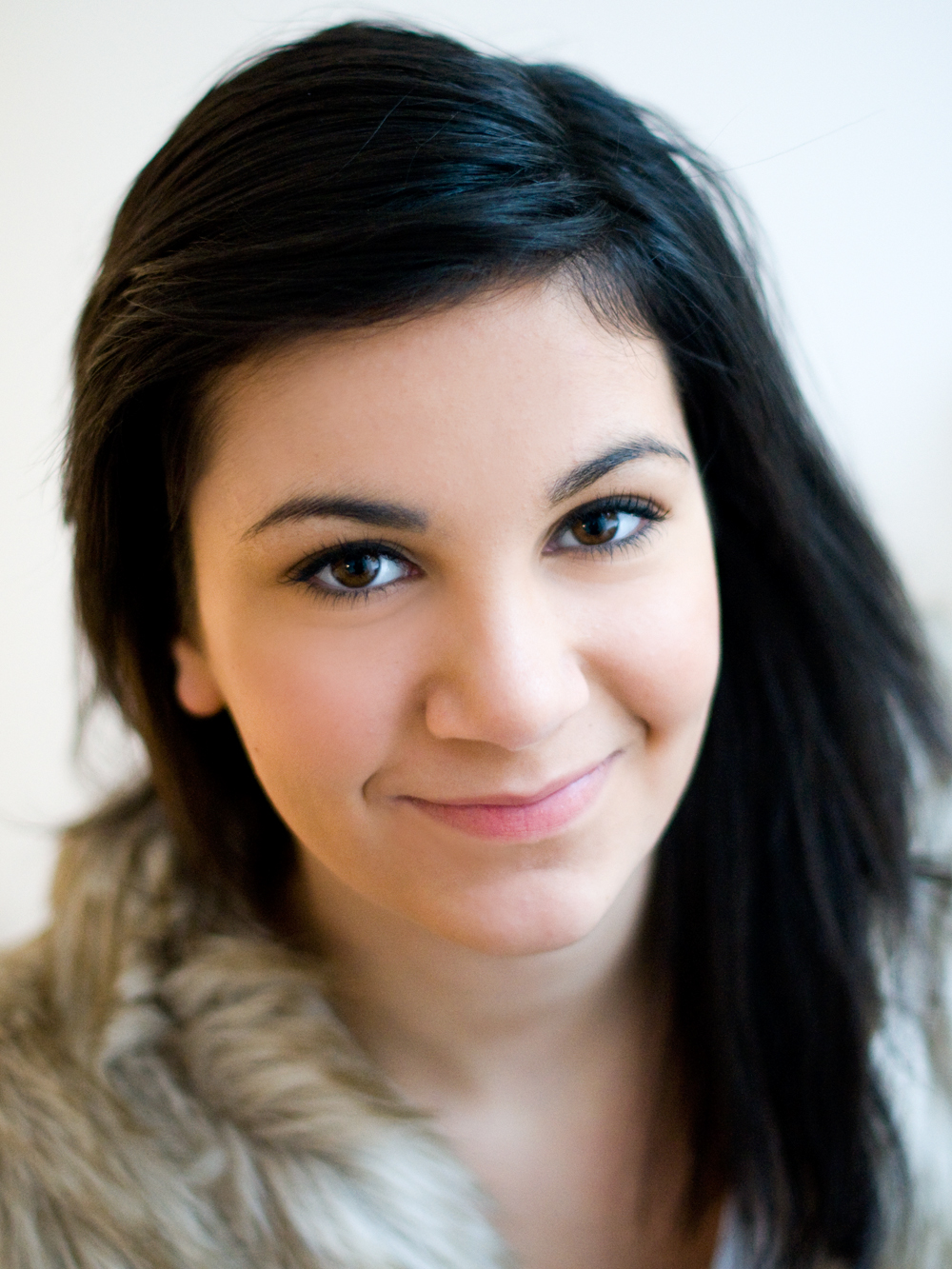
- Leandersson in November 2009
- Born: 27 September 1995 (age 31); Falun, Sweden
- Occupation: Actress
- Years active: 2008–present

Lina Leandersson (born 27 September 1995) is a Swedish-Iranian actress. She is best known for playing the lead role of Eli in the 2008 Swedish romantic vampire film Let the Right One In, based on the novel by the same name.

== Early life and career ==
Lina Leandersson was born in Falun, Sweden. She took an interest in performing from an early age, acting in amateur theatre performances, attending drama courses, and performing street- and jazz dance. One of her first roles was in amateur theatre performance, playing the mother of a spoiled girl wanting new jeans.

In 2006 she appeared as a jury member in the Swedish song competition Lilla Melodifestivalen. The same year, she was selected as one of five from five hundred applicants to participate in Nickelodeon's programledarskola, which was televised in October 2006.

== Let the Right One In ==
Leandersson applied for the role in Let the Right One In through a web-based casting service. After being contacted by child casting director Maggie Widstrand, she auditioned for the role three times before finally being cast. She was unaware that the role she was auditioning for was that of a vampire. "I was shocked", she later told Expressen; "I thought it was a more usual role." But as soon as she grew accustomed to the idea, "it became even more fun. I wanted to be a vampire when I was little", she said.

In the film, she plays Eli, a child vampire who develops a friendship with the main character, 12-year-old Oskar (played by Kåre Hedebrant). Oskar is frequently tormented by bullies. Eli initially tells Oskar to fight back, and rescues him in the end, killing three of the bullies in the process. Because Eli is supposed to be an androgynous character in the film, director Tomas Alfredson decided to overdub Leandersson's voice with a less feminine one. "Lina's voice is beautiful, but I thought it was too high in pitch", he said. Eli's voice throughout the whole film was provided by Elif Ceylan. In an interview with Dagens Nyheter, Leandersson laughingly commented that "it was actually nice to be dubbed, my voice sounds weird".

I loved the movie. It is so special — a dramatic, scary movie with children in leading roles. It's frightening yet so fantastically beautiful. It was the best thing in my life to do this movie.

—Lina Leandersson

Leandersson and Hedebrant were never allowed to read the script. Instead, the director would read their lines aloud to them before every scene. According to Leandersson, "Tomas is a good teller. I listened very carefully." She identified the most difficult parts as the ones where she was supposed to be angry, and the transitioning between being normal and "crazy". In an interview, Leandersson recalled how she went totally into her role, to the point of "becoming" the character Eli, but affirmed that there are few similarities between herself and her character, describing Eli as more mature and contemplative. While she found it uncomfortable to film outdoor scenes in temperatures down to −30 °C, she described her experience as "the most fun [she] has ever had."

When asked about the biggest challenge in making the film, Alfredson mentioned the fact that people already would have a perception of the characters and the surroundings from the novel. He especially felt that the depiction of Eli was difficult, but stated that he was "very happy about Lina". On another occasion, he again commented positively on Leandersson's appearance, stating that "[w]e hardly used makeup or anything in post-production to make her like this, she is simply damn good. She's also a very special girl, which I think shows in the film." He has frequently commended Leandersson for her intelligence, often comparing her to "an 80-year-old woman, very wise and very quiet."

=== Reception ===
Let the Right One In was an international success. Critics lauded the performances of the young leads, often highlighting Leandersson for particular acclaim. According to Karen Durbin of Elle, she "evokes Eli's radical apartness with an air of watchful caution and a contained stillness of body that not only belies her childish appearance (...)", and "In a performance devoid of sentimentality she perfectly captures the awful solitude of a creature who exists outside time". James Berardinelli also praised Leandersson for "crafting an individual who is both mysterious and compelling", while Justin Lowe of The Hollywood Reporter wrote: "The youthful actors imbue even the most emotional and disturbing scenes with remarkable complexity. Leandersson is particularly impressive as the conflicted young vampire who wants nothing more than to be an ordinary girl again". Luke Y. Thompson of LA Weekly compared her performance favorably to that of Kirsten Dunst as the child vampire Claudia in Interview with the Vampire. He concluded that, while Dunst "used to be the gold standard; in Leandersson, I think we have a new champion." The Oregonian called Leandersson's performance "incredible", and expressed doubt that any actress in the American remake could top it. While Swedish reviewers generally made positive comments about the two leads, Emma Engström of Göteborgs-Posten felt that Leandersson's character was lacking in depth.

Leandersson received several awards and award nominations for her performance in the film.

== Other projects ==
In 2012 and 2013, Lina filmed for Estonian director Kadri Kousaar's film The Arbiter and Swedish director Sofia Norlin's feature debut Broken Hill Blues.

In 2015, she made her stage debut on Sweden's national stage - the Royal Dramatic Theatre in Henrik Ibsen's play The Wild Duck

== Personal life ==
Leandersson grew up in Falun with her mother, stepfather, and two younger sisters. She is of Swedish and Iranian descent. Leandersson has always liked to dance and play theatre. Though there are several athletes in her family, she is not particularly fond of sports. "I was on a football team when I was in third grade. But I was so bad that I wasn't allowed to play in a match", she recalled. She has stated on several occasions that she wants to continue acting, and that she would like to try different types of roles to challenge herself. Leandersson was a student at Gruvrisskolan. In an interview, she noted history was her favourite subject, because she finds it "interesting to know how people lived and died in the past". She didn't see school as a hindrance to continue acting, saying that she "will just have to work harder than everyone else. But school isn't that difficult, it's quite easy." She is a fan of the Twilight film series. In the years 2011–2014, she was studying theatre at Kulturama, a school for performing arts in Stockholm, Sweden.

== Filmography ==
Year	Title	Role
2008	Let the Right One In	Eli
2011	15 - Det är mitt liv (TV-series S1.E6)	Sarah
2013	The Arbiter	Ronja
2013	Broken Hill Blues	Zerin
2022	Stilla liv - En film om skapandet av Lars Noréns verk som utspelar sig bortom orden	Self

== Stage ==
Year	Role	Title	Director	Venue
2015	Hedvig	Vildanden; Henrik Ibsen	Anna Pettersson	Dramaten
2016	Anna	Fåglarna; Tarjei Veesas	Ole Anders Tandberg	Dramaten
2016	Katja	Fäder och söner Brian Friel	Runar Hodne	Dramaten
2017		Stilla liv Lars Norén	Lars Norén	Dramaten
2020		Vasa; August Strindberg	Anna Pettersson	Dalateatern

== Awards ==
Year	Award	Category	Film	Result
2008	Chicago Film Critics Association Awards 2008	Most Promising Performer	Let the Right One In	Nominated
2009	Online Film Critics Society Awards 2008	Breakthrough Performer	Let the Right One In	Won
2009	2009 Wonder Awards	Best Performance By an Actress In a Leading Role	Let the Right One In	Won
2009	30th Annual Young Artist Awards	Best Performance in an International Feature Film — Leading Young Performers	Let the Right One In	Nominated
2009	35th Annual Saturn Awards	Best Performance By a Younger Actor	Let the Right One In	Nominated
2009	2009 Fangoria Chainsaw Awards	Best Actress	Let the Right One In	Won
2009	2009 Constellation Awards	Best Female Performance in a 2008 Science Fiction Film	Let the Right One In	Nominated
2009	Scream Awards 2009	Best Horror Actress	Let the Right One In	Nominated
2009	Scream Awards 2009	Breakout Performance-Female	Let the Right One In	Nominated
