= Sanning eller konsekvens =

- Swedish DVD cover
- Directed by: Christina Olofson
- Written by: Annika Thor
- Produced by: Christina Olofson
- Starring: Tove Edfeldt; Anna Gabrielsson; Alexandra Dahlström
- Cinematography: Robert Nordström
- Music by: Johan Zachrisson
- Distributed by: Sandrew Metronome
- Release date: 17 October 1997
- Running time: 77 minutes
- Countries: Sweden; Finland
- Language: Swedish

Sanning eller konsekvens ("Truth or Dare") is a 1997 Swedish drama film directed by Christina Olofson.

The film was the 1998 Winner of Crystal Bear for Best Feature Film at the Berlin International Film Festival.

== Plot ==
Nora is in sixth grade in the Högalid School (Högalidsskolan) in Stockholm. She is torn between spending time with the cool girls Fanny and Sabina and the bullied Karin.

== Cast ==
- Tove Edfeldt as Nora
- Anna Gabrielsson as Karin
- Alexandra Dahlström as Fanny
- Emelina Lindberg-Filippopoulou as Sabina
- Katja Steinholtz-Skog as Maja
- Ellen Swedenmark as Emma
- Totte Steneby as Tobbe
- Bobo Steneby as Jonas
- Fredrik Ådén as Emil
- Erik Johansson as Anton
- Carina Lidbom as Lena, Nora's mother
- Suzanne Reuter as Gunilla, teacher
- Lena-Pia Bernhardsson as Karin's mother
- Jonas Falk as Karin's father
- Maria Grip as Sabina's mother
- Göran Forsmark as the naked man
- Lasse Lindroth as Ismet
- Lena B. Eriksson as Emma's mother
- Håkan Fohlin as the gym teacher
- Kalle Spets as Kalle
- Noomi Rapace as Nadja
