= The Children of Bullerbyn Village =

1960 film

- Film poster
- Also known as: Alla vi barn i Bullerbyn
- Based on: The Six Bullerby Children by Astrid Lindgren
- Written by: Astrid Lindgren
- Directed by: Olle Hellbom
- Starring: Kaj Andersson
- Composer: Charles Redland
- Country of origin: Sweden
- Original language: Swedish

Production
- Producer: Olle Nordemar
- Cinematography: Stig Hallgren
- Running time: 90 minutes
- Production company: Artfilm

Original release
- Network: Sveriges Radio-TV
- Release: 8 September – 22 December 1962

The Children of Bullerbyn Village (Swedish: Alla vi barn i Bullerbyn) is a 1960 TV film re-edited from the 1960 Swedish TV series of the same name and directed by Olle Hellbom. It was entered into the 2nd Moscow International Film Festival.

== Cast ==
- Kaj Andersson as Bosse
- Tove Hellbom as Kerstin
- Jan Erik Husbom as Olle
- Tomas Johansson as Lasse
- Elisabeth Nordkvist as Anna
- Lena Wixell as Lisa
- Kim Åsberg as Britta
