= More About the Children of Noisy Village =

- Directed by: Lasse Hallström
- Screenplay by: Astrid Lindgren
- Based on: The Six Bullerby Children novels by Astrid Lindgren
- Produced by: Waldemar Bergendahl
- Starring: Linda Bergström; Crispin Dickson Wendenius; Henrik Larsson; Ellen Demérus; Anna Sahlin; Harald Lönnbro
- Cinematography: Jens Fischer
- Edited by: Susanne Linnman
- Music by: Georg Riedel
- Production company: Svensk Filmindustri
- Distributed by: Svensk Filmindustri
- Release date: 5 September 1987 (Sweden)
- Running time: 89 minutes
- Country: Sweden
- Language: Swedish

More About the Children of Noisy Village (Swedish: Mer om oss barn i Bullerbyn) is a Swedish film which was released to cinemas in Sweden on 5 September 1987, directed by Lasse Hallström, based on the books about The Six Bullerby Children by Astrid Lindgren.

It is a sequel to The Children of Noisy Village which premiered the year before. Both films were later reworked into a seven-episode television series that was broadcast in 1989.

== Cast ==
- Linda Bergström as Lisa
- Crispin Dickson Wendenius as Lasse
- Henrik Larsson as Bosse
- Ellen Demérus as Britta
- Anna Sahlin as Anna
- Harald Lönnbro as Olle
- Tove Edfeldt as Kerstin
