= Rasmus, Pontus och Toker =

1956 film by Stig Olin

- Directed by: Stig Olin
- Screenplay by: Astrid Lindgren
- Produced by: Olle Nordemar
- Music by: Bengt Hallberg
- Release date: 1956
- Running time: 92 minutes
- Country: Sweden
- Language: Swedish

Rasmus, Pontus och Toker is a 1956 Swedish film directed by Stig Olin and written by Astrid Lindgren.

== Plot ==
Rasmus' sister Britta and her classmate Joachim are in love. Britta finds an album in which Joachim lists his ex-girlfriends (Magareta, Yvonne, Ulla & Brit) along with a photo. She explains that she would find it terrible if her photo was put into Joachim's album.

At the afternoon, Britta, Joachim, Rasmus and Pontus want to attend the show of the sword swallower Alfredo. Rasmus and Pontus don't have enough money to pay for the show. Therefore, they ask Alfredo to let them in for half of the price, but Alfredo rejects rudely. Rasmus and Pontus secretly sneak into the show, but they are discovered by Alfredo and thrown out.

A while later, Ernst visits Alfredo. Ernst has just been released from prison. The antique dealer Paul has told Ernst where he can find the country's largest silver collection: it is at the house of Joachim's family. Ernst wants to steal it along with Alfredo.

When Britta and Joachim go to rehearsal for their band, one of Joachim's friends tries to kiss Britta. Britta immediately pushes him away, but Joachim believes that Britta is the one to blame. Britta and Joachim argue and end their relationship. Britta is afraid that Joachim puts her photo into the album of his ex-girlfriends. Britta tells her brother Rasmus about it. Rasmus promises to get the photo.

Rasmus and his friend Pontus want to break into Joachim's house and steal the photo. The same night that Alfredo and Ernst want to steal the silver collection. Rasmus and Pontus find the photo in Joachim's wallet and take it with them. When they leave the house, they see Ernst and Alfredo who are trying to escape with the stolen property. Rasmus and Pontus follow the criminals. A short time later they are discovered and locked up along with Rasmus' dog. Ernst quickly realizes how important the dog is to Rasmus. He threatens to kill the dog if Rasmus and Pontus tell the police about what they have seen. The criminals lock the dog up and want to return it to the boys on Thursday morning. Then the boys are allowed to leave.

Soon, Rasmus and Pontus find the stolen goods and exchange them with worthless objects.

On Thursday morning Rasmus and Pontus ask about their dog. The criminals tell the boys about an abandoned house where the dog is supposed to be. There the criminals lock Rasmus and Pontus in. The two boys can escape. Finally, they find the dog. They tell Rasmus' father, who is a police officer, about the thieves. The criminals want to offer their stolen goods to the antique dealer Paul, but discover that the stolen goods were exchanged by Rasmus and Pontus.

The thieves go back to Rasmus and Pontus. Rasmus and Pontus are back in the room, where there were locked up in. They tell the criminals they will show them the stolen goods. They lead the criminals into a dark house where the stolen goods are. The house turns out to be the police station and the criminals are received by the police.

Rasmus, Pontus and Britta go to the summer party, but Britta is sad, because she misses Joachim. At the party, Rasmus secretly puts the photo that Joachim had into Britta's hand. Britta thinks Joachim had given it to her. On the back of the photo she reads: "She is the only one". Britta is deeply moved and asks if that is true. Joachim wonders why Britta did not know that. Britta and Joachim kiss each other. Rasmus and Pontus watch the couple. They say that hopefully they will never be like that.

== Cast ==
- Eskil Dalenius: Rasmus Persson
- Sven Almgren: Pontus
- Pia Skoglund: Patricia 'Britta' Persson
- Torsten Wahlund: Joakim von Rencken
- Stig Järrel: Alfredo
- Elof Ahrle: Patrick Persson
- Stig Olin: Ernst

== Background ==
The screenplay for Rasmus, Pontus och Toker was Astrid Lindgren's first stand-alone screenplay.

At first Astrid Lindgren wrote the script for an audio play series. The script was later used and rewritten for the film. The book titled Rasmus, Pontus och Toker was first released after publication of the film. On December 12, 1956 Rasmus, Pontus och Toker premiered in Stockholm. The film was shot in Mariefred and the AB Sandrew-Ateljéerna Studios in Stockholm.

Rasmus Persson is played by the same actor, that portrays Rasmus Rasmusson in Bill Bergson and the White Rose Rescue or Rasmus Oskarsson in Luffaren och Rasmus but these are both not the same characters. This is a completely independent film.

== Reception ==
=== Critical response ===
The Lexikon des internationalen Films says the film is "well-made entertainment for children, with few flaws".
