= Mord, lilla vän =

1955 film

- Directed by: Stig Olin
- Starring: Stig Olin
- Release date: 26 February 1955
- Running time: 88 minutes
- Country: Sweden
- Language: Swedish

Mord, lilla vän is a 1955 Swedish drama film directed by and starring Stig Olin.

== Cast ==
- Stig Olin as Dick Mattsson
- Inga Landgré as Brita Ljungdahl
- Gösta Cederlund as Herman Rooth
- Peter Lindgren as Valter Smitt
- Torsten Lilliecrona as Rune Gordon
- Ingvar Kjellson as Erik Ljungdahl
- Curt Masreliez as Klas Gillnader
- Mimi Pollak as Olga Vaern
- Hans Strååt as Martin Eriksson
- Inga Gill as Mrs. Nygren
- Bengt Eklund as Pierre Olovsson
- Nils Kihlberg as Jan Kristensson
- Ulf Johanson as Olle Sivert
