= Louise Peterhoff =

Swedish actress (born 1977)

- Born: 12 May 1977 (age 48)
- Occupation: Actress
- Spouse: Alexander Mørk-Eidem

Louise Peterhoff (born 12 May 1977) is a Swedish actress. She trained for ten years as a ballet dancer at the Royal Swedish Ballet.

She was born on 12 May 1977. Her father's family fled from Estonia in 1944.

She played Elin Hammar in Blue Eyes (2014).

She is married to Alexander Mørk-Eidem.

== Filmography ==
=== Films ===
- 2019 Midsommar - Hanna
- 2014 Gentlemen - as Nina Negg
- 2013 Den som söker - as Lena
- 2012 Call Girl - as Ulla
- 1988 Nånting levande åt Lame-Kal - as Annastina

=== Television ===
- 2020 Peacemaker - Rauhantekijä - Emilia Engblom
- 2018, 2021 Det som göms i snö – as Caijsa Bergholm
- 2016 Gentlemen & Gangsters - as Nina Negg
- 2015 The Bridge - as Annika
- 2014-15 Blue Eyes - as Elin Hammar
- 2013-14 Äkta människor - as Cloette
- 2011 Anno 1790 - as Pauline Martin
- 2003 Skeppsholmen - as Natasha
- 2002 Spung - as Krista MacCloud
