= Luffaren och Rasmus =

1955 Swedish film directed by Rolf Husberg

- Directed by: Rolf Husberg
- Screenplay by: Astrid Lindgren
- Produced by: Olle Nordemar
- Cinematography: Stig Hallgren
- Edited by: Eric Nordemar
- Music by: Lille Bror Söderlundh
- Release date: 1955
- Running time: 92 minutes
- Country: Sweden
- Language: Swedish

Luffaren och Rasmus (Rasmus and the Vagabond) is a 1955 Swedish film directed by Rolf Husberg and written by Astrid Lindgren.

== Plot ==
Rasmus lives in an orphanage. He wants to be adopted by loving parents, but soon he realizes that only girls are adopted. One day he decides to escape from the orphanage to find the parents on his own.

Shortly after his escape, he meets the tramp Oskar. He joins Oskar on his trip around the country. Oskar earns money by playing the accordion and singing for other people.

One day Oskar and Rasmus are singing in front of a house where a robbery is taking place. The old woman who lives alone in the house is forced to pretend that everything is normal. Oscar and Rasmus realize that something strange is going on. Rasmus sees someone hiding behind the curtain. He also believes the old woman is terribly scared and asks Oscar to find out why. The two observe how some criminals are stealing a valuable necklace.

After the robbery, the old woman is seriously ill and can not testify. The doctor suspects that she may die. Only the maid Anna-Stina testifies. She pretends to be a victim of the robbery, but she and two of her accomplices are responsible for the robbery. She also explains that a tramp robbed the old lady along with a little boy. Therefore, Oscar and Rasmus are suspected of having something to do with the robbery.

Rasmus and Oskar don't know about the allegations and sing in front of the two accomplices of the maid. Rasmus immediately recognizes the shoes of one of the accomplices. He had seen it flashing up behind the curtain. Rasmus also recognizes the other criminal. He suggests that he and Oskar could go to the police, but Oskar says that nobody would believe a tramp and a homeless child. Besides, they would need proof.

Soon, the robbers hide their stolen goods in the house where Rasmus and Oskar spend the night. Rasmus and Oskar are discovered by the robbers, but Oskar can hide the stolen goods from the robbers. Then Oskar and Rasmus go to another village to sing there.

A while later Oskar and Rasmus are arrested, because the police suspects that they are the criminals who robbed the old lady. Rasmus and Oskar tell who the real criminals are, but the police does not believe them. Rasmus escapes, but is captured by the criminals who want him to tell them where the stolen goods are. Only Oskar knows where the stolen goods are. The robbers want to free Oskar from prison so that he can not tell the police too much about them and tell them the hiding place. Oskar pretends to join the plan but wants to outsmart the criminals. He shows the criminals the hiding place while he is secretly followed by a few policemen. The police finally recognizes who is responsible for the robbery. Oskar and Rasmus give them the stolen goods. While the criminals are arrested, Rasmus and Oskar leave and they go to a house. As it turns out, it is the house of Oskar. He lives there with his wife, but has left his home to live as a tramp. Oskar and his wife want to adopt Rasmus and he finally has a home.

== Cast ==
- Eskil Dalenius: Rasmus Oskarsson
- Åke Grönberg: Oskar
- Gudrun Brost: Märta
- Sven Almgren: Gunnar
- Eivor Landström: Anna-Stina Karlsson
- Brita Öberg: Miss Höök
- Björn Berglund: Lif
- Sture Djerf: Leander

== Background ==
At first Astrid Lindgren wrote the script for an audio play series, which was first broadcast in 1955 on Sveriges Radio. The script was later used and rewritten for the film. The book titled Rasmus på luffen was first released after publication of the film. On December 3, 1955 Rasmus, Pontus och Toker premiered in Stockholm.

Rasmus Oskarsson is played by the same actor who portrays Rasmus Rasmusson in Bill Bergson and the White Rose Rescue or Rasmus Persson in Rasmus, Pontus och Toker but these are both not the same characters. This is a completely independent film.

== Reception ==
=== Critical response ===
The Lexikon des internationalen Films says the film is an "educationally clever" children's film based on the book by Astrid Lindgren.

Lova Hagerfors from the Swedish Film Institute believes that the film is told honestly and with great warmth. It was easy to empathize with the fate of Rasmus. The film is surprisingly timeless and still suitable for children today.

OnealRedux from moviebreak.de praises the cheeky dialogues and good characters. The film has a "flair for the 50s" and reveals itself "as a great Feel-Good-Movie".
