= Bert (TV series) =

- Directed by: Tomas Alfredson, Svante Kettner
- Opening theme: Älskade ängel by Lill-Babs
- Country of origin: Sweden
- Original language: Swedish
- No. of seasons: 1
- No. of episodes: 12

Production
- Running time: circa 30 minutes

Original release
- Network: Kanal 1
- Release: 1 October – 17 December 1994

Bert is a Swedish television series with 12 episodes, based on the Bert Diaries by Anders Jacobsson and Sören Olsson, and originally airing over SVT each Saturday evening during the period of 1 October-17 December 1994. It was directed by Tomas Alfredson and Svante Kettner. The theme song was performed by Lill-Babs, and called "Älskade ängel". Another song regaining revival with the TV series was Sven-Olof Sandberg's 1938 success "Är det så här när man är kär".

The plot is based on the Bert Diaries, but just like in the comics, the story opens in the 6th grade, not the 5th like in the books.

== Episodes ==
1. Närkontakt i sjätte klassen
2. Den ohyggligt fule
3. Erik the Great
4. Det viktiga är inte att kämpa väl utan att vinna
5. Min älskling du är som en tulipan
6. Fega pojkar får ibland kyssa vackra flickor
7. Sjön sugar
8. Hjärnsläpp
9. Fina, fina Paulina
10. Klimpen, min allra bästa vän
11. Sådan far, sådan son
12. Ett långt och lyckligt liv

== Home video ==
The series was released to VHS in 1995 on six VHS tapes by Sandrew film consisting of two episodes on each tape, and by Sandrew in 1999 to DVD with three discs each one consisting of four episodes, and in 2011 the entire series was released on one single DVD disc.

The home video release saw much of the music being replaced because of high costs for the rights to many of the songs.

=== Video releases ===
==== VHS ====
Number	Title	Episode 1	Episode 2	Release date
1	"Bert 1"	Närkontakt i sjätte klassen	Den ohyggligt fule	1995
2	"Bert 2"	Erik the Great	Det viktiga är inte att kämpa väl utan att vinna	1995
3	"Bert 3"	Min älskling du är som en tulipan	Fega pojkar får ibland kyssa vackra flickor	1995
4	"Bert 4"	Sjön suger	Hjärnsläpp	1995
5	"Bert 5"	Fina, fina Paulina	Klimpen, min allra bästa vän	1995
5	"Bert 6"	Sådan son, sådan far	Ett långt och lyckligt liv	1995

==== DVD ====
Number	Title	Episode 1	Episode 2	Episode 3	Episode 4	Release date
1	"Berts röjiga rockliv"	Närkontakt i sjätte klassen	Den ohyggligt fule	Erik the Great	Det viktiga är inte att kämpa väl utan att vinna	1999
2	"Berts känsliga kyssar"	Min älskling du är som en tulipan	Fega pojkar får ibland kyssa vackra flickor	Sjön suger	Hjärnsläpp	1999
3	"Berts piniga pubertet"	Fina, fina Paulina	Klimpen, min allra bästa vän	Sådan son, sådan far	Ett långt och lyckligt liv	1999

== About the series ==
The square often seen in the series is in real life Central Årsta in Southern Stockholm, while the apartment buildings were shot in Hagalund. When the Heman Hunters perform, Martin Andersson (portraying Bert) sings in-universe, while the recorded voice is from Oliver Loftéen (portraying Åke) . A minor role was played by Sarah Dawn Finer.

Lill-Erik was originally intended to domesticate an elk in the episode "Fina, fina Paulina", but when domesticated elk was around, he instead domesticate an elephant on the run from a circus.
