= Alexandra Dahlström =

Swedish actress and film director

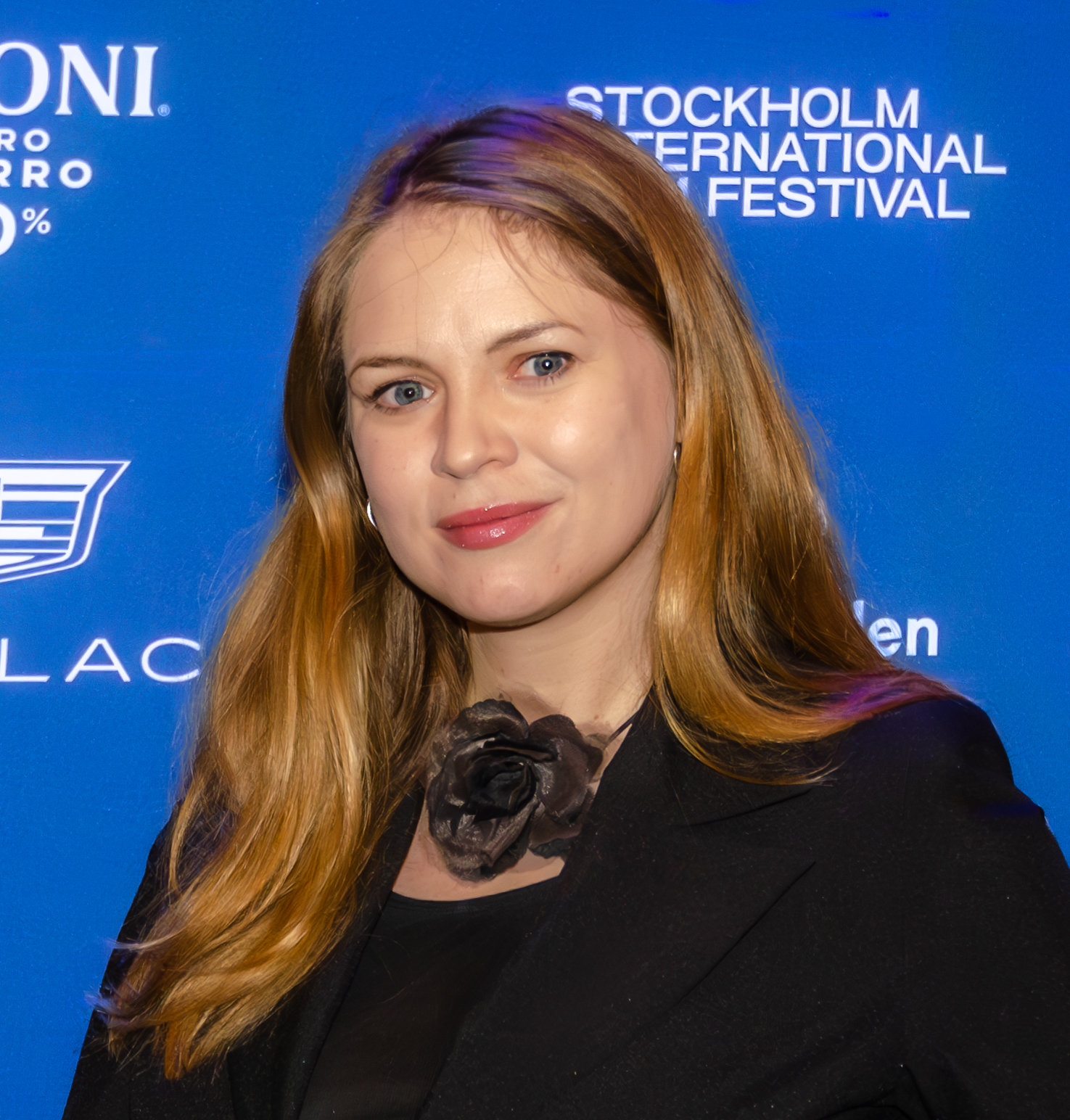
- Dahlström in 2023
- Born: 12 February 1984 (age 41); Gävle, Sweden
- Occupation: Actress
- Years active: 1997–present
- Children: 2

Alexandra Dahlström (born 12 February 1984) is a Swedish actress and film director.

== Career ==
Her first role was in the 1997 film Sanning eller konsekvens.

Dahlström gained international attention in 1998, after starring as "Elin" in the film Show Me Love. For this, she won the Guldbagge Award for Best Actress, together with Rebecka Liljeberg. Despite receiving numerous offers to act in other films, she declined, stating that she wanted to concentrate on finishing school.

In 2002, Dahlström acted as assistant director and Russian translator, alongside Show Me Love director Lukas Moodysson, for his film Lilya 4-ever.

In 2007 Dahlström had a small role in the Dutch soap opera Goede tijden, slechte tijden on RTL 4. She played a Swedish exchange student named Skylar Nilsson. On 18 April 2008 she returned to this role for a short period.

== Personal life ==
She was born on 12 February 1984 in Gävle. Her mother, Irina Borisovna, is Russian, and her father is Swedish. She speaks Swedish, Russian, German, French, English, and Italian.

She lived alone in Stockholm after graduating high school. She continued to act in theatre. After a several-year break, Dahlström again starred in the film Fröken Sverige (Miss Sweden), for which she received favorable reviews.

During the autumn of 2004 she was the DJ for the biggest late night talk show in Sweden, called 'Late Night with Luuk', which she had been originally interviewed on in May 1998 with Rebecka Liljeberg for her acting in Show Me Love. On her debut as DJ for the show, the guests were R.E.M. and British actor Paul Bettany.

After completing her studies, she lived in Rome, Italy, before moving back to Stockholm and is again pursuing a serious acting career. Dahlström is currently in a relationship with Jakob Wiklander. They have two children together.

== Filmography ==
- Sanning eller konsekvens (1997)
- St. Mikael (series) (1998)
- Show Me Love (1998)
- Kranes konditori (theatre play) (1999)
- In Bed with Santa, aka Tomten är far till alla barnen (1999)
- En vacker värld (theatre play) (2001)
- La Carpe (short film) (2001)
- Miss Sweden (2004)
- Goede tijden, slechte tijden (TV series in the Netherlands) (2007, 2008)
- Astro: An Urban Fable in a Magical Rio De Janeiro (2012)
- Blondie (2012)
- Broken Hill Blues (2013)
- Psychosis in Stockholm (2020)
