= Show Me Love (film) =

1998 film by Lukas Moodysson

- Theatrical release poster
- Swedish: Fucking Åmål
- Directed by: Lukas Moodysson
- Written by: Lukas Moodysson
- Produced by: Lars Jönsson
- Starring: Alexandra Dahlström; Rebecka Liljeberg; Erica Carlson; Mathias Rust; Stefan Hörberg; Josefine Nyberg; Ralph Carlsson; Maria Hedborg; Axel Widegren; Jill Ung; Lisa Skagerstam
- Cinematography: Ulf Brantås
- Edited by: Michal Leszczylowski; Bernhard Winkler
- Production companies: Memfis Film; Zentropa Productions; Film i Väst; SVT Drama Göteborg; Svenska Filminstitutet; Danish Film Institute
- Distributed by: Sonet Film
- Release date: 23 October 1998 (Sweden)
- Running time: 89 minutes
- Country: Sweden
- Language: Swedish
- Budget: SEK 9 million
- Box office: 2.1 million admissions

Show Me Love (Swedish: Fucking Åmål) is a 1998 Swedish romantic comedy-drama film written and directed by Lukas Moodysson in his feature-length directorial debut. It stars Rebecka Liljeberg and Alexandra Dahlström as two seemingly disparate teenage girls who begin a tentative romantic relationship. The film was released theatrically in Sweden on 23 October 1998, and premiered internationally at the 1998 Cannes Film Festival.

It received an overwhelmingly positive reception and won four Guldbagge Awards (Sweden's official film awards) at the 1999 ceremony. Its international awards include the Teddy Award at the 1999 Berlin International Film Festival, and the Special Jury Prize at the 34th Karlovy Vary International Film Festival. The film was selected as the Swedish entry for the Best Foreign Language Oscar at the 71st Academy Awards, but it did not make the final shortlist.

The Swedish title refers to the small town of Åmål in Västra Götaland County, western Sweden. However, only a few scenes were filmed in Åmål, and they were not included in the final product. Primary filming took place in the nearby town of Trollhättan, the location of the production company Film i Väst's studios.

== Plot ==
Two girls, Agnes and Elin, attend school in the small town of Åmål, Sweden. Elin is outgoing and popular but finds her life unsatisfying and dull. Agnes, by contrast, has no real friends and is constantly depressed. Agnes is in love with Elin but cannot find any way to express it.

Agnes' parents worry about their daughter's reclusive life and try to be reassuring. Her mother decides, against Agnes' will, to throw a 16th birthday party for her. Agnes is afraid no one will come. Viktoria, a girl in a wheelchair, shows up and Agnes shouts at her in front of her parents, telling her they are friends only because no one else will talk to them. Agnes, overcome with anger and depression, goes to her room and cries into her pillow shouting that she wishes she were dead, while her father tries to soothe her. Viktoria leaves and Agnes's family eats the food made for the party.

Elin arrives at Agnes' house, mainly as an excuse to avoid going to another party, where there will be a boy (Johan, played by Mathias Rust) she wants to avoid. Elin's older sister, Jessica, who comes with her, dares her to kiss Agnes, who is rumoured to be a lesbian. Elin fulfills the dare and then runs out with Jessica, only to soon feel guilty for having humiliated Agnes.

After becoming drunk at the other party, Elin gets sick and throws up. Johan tries to help her and ends up professing his love to her. Elin leaves Johan and the party, only to return to Agnes's house to apologize for how she acted earlier. In doing so, Elin stops Agnes from cutting herself. She even manages to persuade Agnes to return with her to the other party. On the way, Elin shares her real feelings about being trapped in Åmål. She asks Agnes about being a lesbian and believes that their problems could be solved by leaving Åmål and going to Stockholm. On impulse, Elin persuades Agnes to hitchhike to Stockholm, which is a five-hour journey by car. They find a driver who agrees to take them, believing them to be sisters who are visiting their grandmother. While sitting in the back seat, they have their first real kiss. The driver sees them and, shocked at the behaviour of the two 'sisters', orders them to leave the car.

Elin discovers that she is attracted to Agnes but is afraid to admit it. She proceeds to ignore Agnes and refuses to talk to her. Elin's sister Jessica sees that she is in love and pushes her to figure out who it is. To cover the fact that she is in love with Agnes, Elin lies, pretending to be in love with Johan, and loses her virginity during a short-lived relationship with him. Elin eventually admits her feelings, when, after a climactic scene in a school bathroom, they are forced to 'out' their relationship to the school.

The film ends with Elin and Agnes sitting in Elin's bedroom drinking chocolate milk. Elin explains that she often adds too much chocolate until her milk is nearly black. She must fill another glass with milk and mix it and that her sister Jessica often gets mad that she finishes the chocolate. Elin has the last word saying "It makes a lot of chocolate milk. But that doesn't matter".

== Cast ==
- Alexandra Dahlström as Elin Olsson
- Rebecka Liljeberg as Agnes Ahlberg
- Erica Carlson as Jessica Olsson
- Mathias Rust as Johan Hulth
- Stefan Hörberg as Markus
- Josefine Nyberg as Viktoria
- Ralph Carlsson as Agnes's father, Olof
- Maria Hedborg as Agnes's mother, Karin
- Axel Widegren as Agnes's little brother, Oskar
- Jill Ung as Elin's and Jessica's mother, Birgitta

== Title ==
The original title of the film, Fucking Åmål, refers to the girls' feelings about their small town: In a key scene, Elin shouts in desperation "varför måste vi bo i fucking jävla kuk-Åmål?" (which roughly translates to "why do we have to live in fucking bloody cock-Åmål?").

According to Moodysson, the problem with the original title started when the film was Sweden's candidate for the Academy Awards, though eventually it was not chosen as a nominee. The Hollywood industry magazine Variety refused to run an advertisement for Fucking Åmål. Thus, American distributor Strand Releasing asked for a new title. Moodysson took the new title from the song at the end of the film, by Robyn. Distributors in other native English-speaking countries then followed suit.

- German: Raus aus Åmål, lit. 'Out of Åmål [i.e. leaving the town]'
- Spanish: Descubriendo el Amor ("Discovering Love")
- Portuguese: Amigas de Colégio ("School Friends")
- Czech: Láska je láska ("Love is Love") The Czech title is based on a Lucie Bílá song of the same name, which references homosexuality.
- Russian: Покажи мне любовь (Pokazhi mne lyubov, "Show Me Love")
- Hebrew: F- Åmål
- English: Show Me Love
- French (Canada): Qui Aimes-Tu? ("Who do you love/like?")

== Reception ==
=== Political controversy ===
Even before the film was completed, it created controversy in the town of Åmål. Local politicians campaigned to get the title changed because they argued that it would show the town in an unfair way and even undermine it as an economic centre. Further pressure was brought on the makers of the film, the Film i Väst studio, who are partly financed by Swedish local authorities, including Åmål.

However, the local complaints had no effect on the content or release of the film. Since the release, the town of Åmål has tried to embrace the publicity generated, despite the fact that the town's name is missing from the English title. In the early 2000s the town founded the pop music "Fucking Åmål Festival."

=== Critical and commercial response ===
Fucking Åmål received the highest audience figures for a Swedish film in 1998–9, with a total audience of 867,576 and a total audience for the whole of Europe of 2.1 million. It grossed $6.5 million in Sweden and $3 million in Norway. Some international reports stated that the film had outgrossed the Hollywood film Titanic in Sweden. In fact, Titanic had over twice as many viewers as Show Me Love in Sweden in 1998.

Show Me Love has an approval rating of 91% on review aggregator website Rotten Tomatoes, based on 44 reviews, and an average rating of 7.5/10. The website's critical consensus states: "A naturalistic depiction of teenage life, Show Me Love has a charming, authentic feel". Metacritic assigned the film a weighted average score of 73 out of 100, based on 17 critics, indicating "generally favorable reviews". It is among the top ten of the British Film Institute list of the 50 films you should see by the age of 14.

The film received consistently good reviews, including the realism and credibility of its portrayal of what it is like to be a teenager in a small town in the 1990s. In addition, the efforts of the young actors were praised. Jan-Olov Andersson at Aftonbladet felt that Dahlström's and Liljeberg's imaginative appearance and interaction was "sensationally credible", and Bo Ludvigsson at Svenska Dagbladet wrote that it was "a warm, strong and confident film about the courage to be human". Ludvigsson also believed that Fucking Åmål, with its storytelling drive, leave and authenticity, was well above most of the Swedish films of recent years. Anders Hansson at Göteborgs-Posten thought that director Moodysson with fairly ordinary elements created "a film with unusual rise".

Autostraddle placed it at number 20 on its "Top 100 Best Lesbian Movies" list.

=== Cultural impact ===
According to Russian singer Lena Katina, producer Ivan Shapovalov was inspired to create the pop duo t.A.T.u. after the release of this film. The track "Show Me Love" is featured in their album 200 km/h in the Wrong Lane.

The creators of the 2018 Netflix series Everything Sucks! called the film the "biggest influence" on that show's creation.

=== Awards and nominations ===
Year	Award	Category	Nominee(s)	Result	Ref.
1999	Amanda Award	Best Foreign Feature Film	Fucking Åmål, director Lukas Moodysson	Won	
1999	Amanda Award	Best Nordic Feature Film	Lukas Moodysson	Nominated	
1999	Atlantic Film Festival	Best International Feature	Lukas Moodysson	Won	
1999	Berlin International Film Festival	C.I.C.A.E. Award - Recommendation (Panorama)	Lukas Moodysson	Won	
1999	Berlin International Film Festival	Teddy Award - Best Feature Film	Lukas Moodysson	Won	
1999	British Film Institute Awards	Sutherland Trophy - Special Mention	Lukas Moodysson	Won	
1999	Manaki Brothers Film Festival	Special Jury Award	Ulf Brantås	Won	
1999	Cinema Jove - Valencia International Film Festival	Golden Moon of Valencia	Lukas Moodysson	Won	
1999	European Film Awards	Best Film	Lars Jönsson	Nominated	
1999	Flanders International Film Festival Ghent	Student Jury Award	Lukas Moodysson	Won	
1999	Flanders International Film Festival Ghent	Grand Prix	Lukas Moodysson	Nominated	
1999	Guldbagge Awards	Best Film	Lars Jönsson	Won	
1999	Guldbagge Awards	Best Director	Lukas Moodysson	Won	
1999	Guldbagge Awards	Best Screenplay	Lukas Moodysson	Won	
1999	Guldbagge Awards	Best Actress in a Leading Role	Alexandra Dahlström; Rebecka Liljeberg	Won	
1999	Guldbagge Awards	Best Actor in a Supporting Role	Ralph Carlsson	Nominated	
1999	Karlovy Vary International Film Festival	Audience Award	Lukas Moodysson	Won	
1999	Karlovy Vary International Film Festival	FICC - The Don Quixote Prize	Lukas Moodysson	Won	
1999	Karlovy Vary International Film Festival	Special Jury Prize	Lukas Moodysson	Won	
1999	Karlovy Vary International Film Festival	Crystal Globe	Lukas Moodysson	Nominated	
1999	Kyiv International Film Festival "Molodist"	Best Full-Length Fiction Film	Lukas Moodysson	Won	
1999	Kyiv International Film Festival "Molodist"	FIPRESCI	Lukas Moodysson	Won	
1999	Kyiv International Film Festival "Molodist"	Youth Jury Award - Full-Length Feature Film	Lukas Moodysson	Won	
1999	Verzaubert International Gay & Lesbian Film Festival	Rosebud - Best Film	Lukas Moodysson	Nominated	
2000	Bodil Awards	Best Non-American Film	Lukas Moodysson	Nominated	
2000	GLAAD Media Award	Outstanding Film – Limited Release	Lukas Moodysson	Nominated	
2000	International Film Festival Rotterdam	MovieZone Young Jury Award	Lukas Moodysson	Won	

== Soundtrack ==
The film's soundtrack was released through Metronome Records and consists of songs in English and Swedish language. Swedish band Broder Daniel, who contributed three English language songs to Fucking Åmål, saw a spike in popularity after the film's release. The band also released an EP titled Fucking Åmål.

Fucking Åmål/Musiken Från Filmen
Label: Metronome Records
Format: CD, compilation
Country: Sweden
Released: 1998

No.	Title	Lyrics	Music	Artist	Length
1.	"Önskelista" (dialogue from the movie)				0:19
2.	"Drifter"	Henric de la Cour & Yvonne	Henric de la Cour & Yvonne	Yvonne	3:53
3.	"Whirlwind"	Henrik Berggren	Henrik Berggren	Broder Daniel	4:36
4.	"Varför Måste Vi Bo I Fucking Jävla Kuk-Åmål?" (dialogue from the movie)				0:04
5.	"No Dinero No Amor"	J. Hällgren & J. Sagrén	J. Hällgren & J. Sagrén	Betty N' Boop	3:11
6.	"Jag Vill Knarka!" (dialogue from the movie)				0:09
7.	"Blue Sky Black"			Evelyn	2:58
8.	"Sa Hon Det?" (dialogue from the movie)				0:33
9.	"När Vi Två Blir En"	Per Gessle	Per Gessle	Gyllene Tider	3:05
10.	"Jag Vill Inte Va' Med Henne!" (dialogue from the movie)				0:04
11.	"U Drive Me Crazy"	Hogblad & Lehtonen	Hogblad & Lehtonen	Waldo's People	3:19
12.	"Fan Va' Du Är Snygg!" (dialogue from the movie)				0:10
13.	"Fantasy Dreamworld"	Stigsson & Rickstrand	Stigsson & Rickstrand	Combayah	3:26
14.	"Fantasi För Elorgel #34"			Karl-Heinz Glockmann	1:00
15.	"Adagio Per Flauto; Archi Ed Organo" (arrangement by Remo Giazotto)		Tomaso Albinoni	Gunilla Von Bahr & Stockholms Kammarensemble	8:40
16.	"Vi Är Så Jävla Coola!" (dialogue from the movie)				0:10
17.	"I Want To Know What Love Is"	Mick Jones	Mick Jones	Foreigner	5:05
18.	"Funny Bunny Boy"	Lindgren and From	Lindgren and From	Evelyn	3:40
19.	"Hallå!?" (dialogue from the movie)				0:15
20.	"Danny's Dream"	Lars Söderberg	Lars Gullin	Lars Gullin	5:31
21.	"I'll Be Gone"	Henrik Berggren	Henrik Berggren	Broder Daniel	3:39
22.	"Jävla Lebb!" (dialogue from the movie)				0:07
23.	"Simplicity"	Nordlund, Danielsson, Karlsson and Andersson	Nordlund, Danielsson, Karlsson and Andersson	Souls	3:17
24.	"...Vi Ska Gå Och Knulla!" (dialogue from the movie)				0:34
25.	"Underground"	Henrik Berggren	Henrik Berggren	Broder Daniel	2:50
26.	"O'Boy!" (dialogue from the movie)				0:43
27.	"Show Me Love" (title track)	Robyn	Max Martin	Robyn	3:27
Total length:					60:45

== See also ==
- List of submissions to the 71st Academy Awards for Best Foreign Language Film
- List of Swedish submissions for the Academy Award for Best Foreign Language Film
