= Expressens Heffaklump =

Swedish literary award

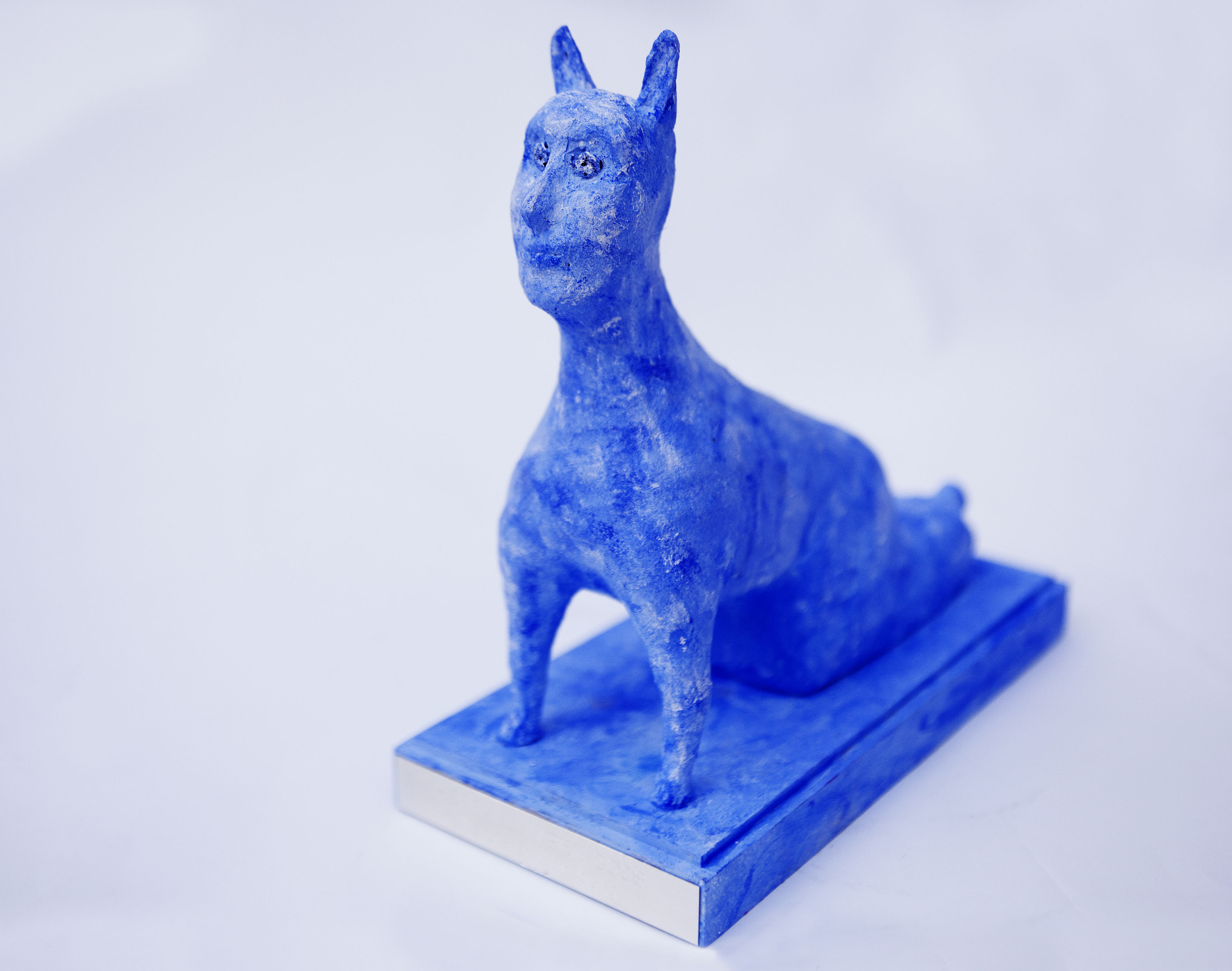
Heffaklumpen statuette

Expressens Heffaklump (Heffaklumpen) is a Swedish annual award for children's and youth culture, especially children's and youth literature, that is awarded by the newspaper Expressen. The award was established in 1966 and the original award statuette was created by the artist Karl Göte Bejemark, but in the 2010s the artist Stina Opitz was given the assignment. The name "Heffaklump" is taken from the Swedish name of the Heffalump character in A. A. Milne's Winnie the Pooh stories.

== Recipients ==
- 1966 – Maria Gripe for Hugo
- 1967 – Max Lundgren for Pojken med guldbyxorna
- 1968 – Harry Kullman for De rödas uppror
- 1969 – Inger and Lasse Sandberg and for Pappa kom ut!
- 1970 – Tove Jansson for Sent i november and Astrid Lindgren for Än lever Emil i Lönneberga
- 1971 – Barbro Lindgren for Jättehemligt
- 1972 – Maud Reuterswärd for Han-där!
- 1973 – No award
- 1974 – Jan Lööf for Sagan om det röda äpplet
- 1975 – Olle Mattson for Talejten väntar i väst
- 1976 – Stig Holmqvist and Aud Talle for Barn i Belfast
- 1977 – Ann-Madeleine Gelotte for Ida Maria från Arfliden
- 1978 – Sven Wernström for Trälarnas fruktan
- 1979 – Elsa Olenius
- 1980 – Lennart Hellsing
- 1981 – Eva Eriksson for Mamman och den vilda bebin
- 1982 – Bo Carpelan for Julius blom, ett huvud för sig
- 1983 – Harriet Alfons for Min nya Skattkammare
- 1984 – Bengt af Klintberg for Skogsmusen och husmusen
- 1985 – Ulf Nilsson for Om ni inte hade mej
- 1986 – Ilon Wikland for Skinn Skerping hemskast av alla spöken i Småland
- 1987 – Anna-Clara Tidholm and Thomas Tidholm for Resan till Ugri-La-Brek
- 1988 – Rose Lagercrantz for Självporträtt utan näsa
- 1989 – Peter Pohl for Medan regnbågen bleknar
- 1990 – Pija Lindenbaum for Else-Marie och småpapporna
- 1991 – Margareta Strömstedt for Majken och skyddsängeln
- 1992 – Viveca Lärn for En barkbåt till Eddie
- 1993 – Jujja Wieslander for Tomas Wieslander, Mamma Mu gungar
- 1994 – Lena Klefelt for Otto och Stures hemliga liv
- 1995 – Ulf Stark for Storebrorsan
- 1996 – Henning Mankell for Pojken som sov med snö i sin säng
- 1997 – Anna Höglund
- 1998 – Jockum Nordström
- 1999 – Jakob Wegelius for Esperanza
- 2000 – Lena Anderson
- 2001 – Pernilla Stalfelt for Kärlekboken
- 2002 – Eva Lindström for Någon flyttar in
- 2003 – Per Nilsson for Ask och Embla
- 2004 – Ylva Karlsson for Resan till kejsaren
- 2005 – Lucas Svensson for Petter och Lotta och stora landsvägen (theatre play)
- 2006 – Olof Landström, Lena Landström
- 2007 – Carin Wirsén and Stina Wirsén for Supershow med Rut och Knut
- 2008 – Manne af Klintberg
- 2009 – Petter Lennstrand for För alla åldrar
- 2010 – Gunna Grähs
- 2011 – Barnens underjordiska scen
- 2012 – Joanna Hellgren
- 2013 – Sara Lundberg
- 2014 – Sven Nordqvist
- 2015 – Frida Nilsson for Ishavspirater
- 2016 – Georg Wadenius
- 2017 – Per Gustavsson
- 2018 – Gunilla Lundgren
- 2019 – Jenny Jägerfeld
- 2020 – Erik Ekstrand
- 2021 – Emma and Lisen Adbåge
- 2022 – Dalija Acin Thelander
- 2023 – Melody Farshin
- 2024 – Lotta Olsson
- 2025 – Fabian Göranson
