= Nils Holgersson Plaque =

Literary award

The Nils Holgersson Plaque is an award given by Swedish Library Association. It was established in 1950, and named for the book The Wonderful Adventures of Nils by Selma Lagerlöf. It is an annual award given to the author of the best children's or young people's book in the Swedish language.

== Winners ==
- 1950 – Astrid Lindgren for "Nils Karlsson Pyssling"
- 1951 – Lennart Hellsing for "Summa summarum"
- 1952 – Sten Bergman for "Vildar och paradisfåglar"
- 1953 – Tove Jansson for "Hur gick det sen?"
- 1954 – The plaque was not awarded
- 1955 – Harry Kullman for "Hemlig resa"
- 1956 – Olle Mattsson for "Briggen Tre Liljor"
- 1957 – Edith Unnerstad for "Farmorsresan" (Journey to Grandmother)
- 1958 – Hans Peterson for "Magnus, Mattias och Mari"
- 1959 – Anna Lisa Wärnlöf for "Pellas bok"
- 1959 – Jeanna Oterdahl additional plaque for rare and valuable work
- 1960 – Kai Söderhjelm for "Mikko i kungens tjänst"
- 1961 – Åke Holmberg for "Ture Sventon, privatdetektiv"
- 1962 – Britt G Hallqvist for "Festen i Hulabo"
- 1963 – Maria Gripe for "Hugo och Josefin"
- 1964 – Karin Anckarsvärd for "Doktorns pojk"
- 1965 – Gunnel Linde for "Den vita stenen"
- 1966 – The plaque was not awarded
- 1967 – Inger Högelin-Brattström (the author's later books for teenagers)
- 1968 – Max Lundgren for "Pojken med guldbyxorna" and "Åshöjdens bollklubb"
- 1969 – Bo Carpelan for "Bågen"
- 1970 – Stig Ericson (total output)
- 1971 – Hans-Eric Hellberg (total output)
- 1972 – Irmelin Sandman Lilius for the Trilogy "Fru Sola"
- 1973 – Inger Sandberg (total output for young children)
- 1974 – Sven Wernström for "Trälarna"
- 1975 – Gunnel Beckman (total output)
- 1976 – Maud Reuterswärd (total output)
- 1977 – Barbro Lindgren for "Lilla Sparvel"
- 1978 – Siv Widerberg (total output)
- 1979 – Bengt Martin for "Bengt och kärleken"
- 1980 – Rose Lagercrantz (the writer's total output)
- 1981 – Helmer Linderholm for "Amisko-serien"
- 1982 – Kerstin Johansson for "Moa och Pelle"
- 1983 – Hans Erik Engqvist (total output)
- 1984 – Ulf Nilsson for "Lilla syster kanin" and "En kamp för frihet"
- 1985 – Mats Larsson for "Trollkarlen från Galdar"
- 1986 – Peter Pohl for "Janne, min vän"
- 1987 – Monica Zak for "Pumans fötter"
- 1988 – Ulf Stark for "Jaguar"
- 1989 – Mats Wahl for "Maj Darlin"
- 1990 – Annika Holm for "Amanda! Amanda!"
- 1991 – Henning Mankell for "Hunden som sprang mot en stjärna"
- 1992 – Viveca Sundvall for "Eddie och Maxon Jaxon"
- 1993 – Sonja Hulth for "Barnens svenska historia"
- 1994 – Thomas Tidholm for "Förr i tiden"
- 1995 – Inger Edelfeldt for "Gravitation"
- 1996 – Helena Dahlbäck for "Jag Julia" and "Min läsebok"
- 1997 – Per Nilsson for "Anarkai"
- 1998 – Moni Nilsson-Brännström for "Bara Tsatsiki"
- 1999 – Annika Thor for "Havets djup"
- 2000 – Stefan Casta for "Spelar Död!"
- 2001 – Janne Lundström for "Morbror Kwesis vålnad"
- 2002 – Wilhelm Agrell for "Dödsbudet"
- 2003 – Åsa Lind for "Sandvargen"
- 2004 – Douglas Foley for "shoo bre"
- 2005 – Petter Lidbeck for "En dag i prinsessan Victorias liv "
- 2006 – Kajsa Isakson for "Min Ella"
- 2007 – Cannie Möller (total output)
- 2008 – Mikael Engström for "Isdraken"
- 2009 – Maud Mangold for "Pärlor till pappa"
- 2010 – Cilla Naumann for "Kulor i hjärtat"
- 2011 – Mårten Melin for Som trolleri
- 2012 – Anna Ehring for Klickflippar och farligheten and Den stora kärleksfebern
- 2013 – Lisa Bjärbo for Allt jag säger är sant
- 2014 – Anna Höglund for Om detta talar man endast med kaniner
- 2015 – Camilla Lagerqvist for Uppdraget
- 2016 – Frida Nilsson for Ishavspirater
- 2017 – Elisabeth Östnäs (Sagan om Turid)
- 2018 – Lisa Lundmark (Haj-Jenny)
- 2019 – Helena Hedlund (Det fina med Kerstin)
- 2020 – Johan Ehn (Hästpojkarna)
- 2021 – Jakob Wegelius (The Sally Jones trilogy)
- 2022 – Annelie Drewsen (Prinsen av Porte de la Chapelle)
- 2023 – Melody Farshin (100k)
- 2024 – Elin Lindell (Världens sämsta syster)
