= Astrid Lindgren Prize =

Swedish literary award

The Astrid Lindgren Prize (Swedish: Astrid Lindgren-priset) is a Swedish literary award for children's literature named after the Swedish writer Astrid Lindgren. The prize was instituted by the publishing house Rabén & Sjögren in 1967 to honour Lindgren on her 60th birthday.

It is awarded annually on Lindgren's birthday, 14 November, to a Swedish writer for children and young adults; this distinguishes it from the Astrid Lindgren Memorial Award, which has a more international focus.

== Recipients ==
Astrid Lindgren Prize recipients
Year	Recipient	Ref.
1967	Åke Holmberg	
1968	Ann Mari Falk	
1969	Harry Kullman	
1970	Lennart Hellsing	
1971	Hans Peterson	
1972	Maria Gripe	
1973	Barbro Lindgren	
1974	Inger and Lasse Sandberg	
1975	Hans-Eric Hellberg	
1976	Irmelin Sandman Lilius	
1977	Kerstin Thorvall	
1978	Gunnel Linde	
1979	Rose Lagercrantz	
1980	Maud Reuterswärd (posthumously)	
1981	Gunilla Bergström	
1982	Inger Brattström	
1983	Siv Widerberg	
1984	Astrid Bergman Sucksdorff	
1985	Viveca Lärn	
1986	Margareta Strömstedt	
1987	Nan Inger Östman	
1988	Lena Anderson	
1988	Christina Björk	
1989	Annika Holm	
1990	Maj Bylock	
1991	Max Lundgren	
1992	Sven Christer Swahn	
1993	Ulf Stark	
1994	Eva Wikander	
1995	Peter Pohl	
1996	Henning Mankell	
1997	Anna-Clara and Thomas Tidholm	
1998	Bo R. Holmberg	
1999	Per Nilsson	
2000	Annika Thor	
2001	Eva Eriksson	
2002	Stefan Casta	
2003	Sven Nordqvist	
2004	Pernilla Stalfelt	
2005	Jujja Wieslander	
2006	Ulf Nilsson	
2007	Helena Östlund	
2008	Pija Lindenbaum	
2009	Olof and Lena Landström	
2010	Moni Nilsson-Brännström	
2011	Jan Lööf	
2012	Katarina Kieri	
2013	Katarina von Bredow	
2014	Frida Nilsson	
2015	Mårten Sandén	
2016	Anna Höglund	
2017	Jenny Jägerfeld	
2018	Lisa Bjärbo	
2019	Kerstin Lundberg Hahn	
2020	Jakob Wegelius	
2021	Ylva Karlsson	
2022	Mårten Melin	
2023	Johan Rundberg	
2024	Petter Lidbeck	
2025	Ingelin Angerborn	
