= Brattström =

Brattström is a surname. Notable people with the surname include:

- Ebba Witt-Brattström (born 1953), Swedish scholar in comparative literature
- Inger Brattström (1920–2018), Swedish writer
- Victor Brattström (born 1997), Swedish ice hockey player
