= Elsa Beskow Plaque =

The Elsa Beskow Plaque, established in 1958 by the Swedish Library Association (Svensk bibkioteksföreniningen), is a Swedish award given to the artist who has created the best Swedish picture book for children or the best illustrated Swedish children's book during the previous year.

The jury for the award consists of six members appointed by the main board of the library association. Four of the members must be active children's librarians, one whom should be the leader of the association's group for children's library activities. The remaining two jury members are external experts in children's literature and illustration art. The jury may choose to award the prize for an artist's overall production. The prize amount has been SEK 25,000 since 2008.

The award is named after the Swedish picture book artist, Elsa Beskow.

== Award recipients ==
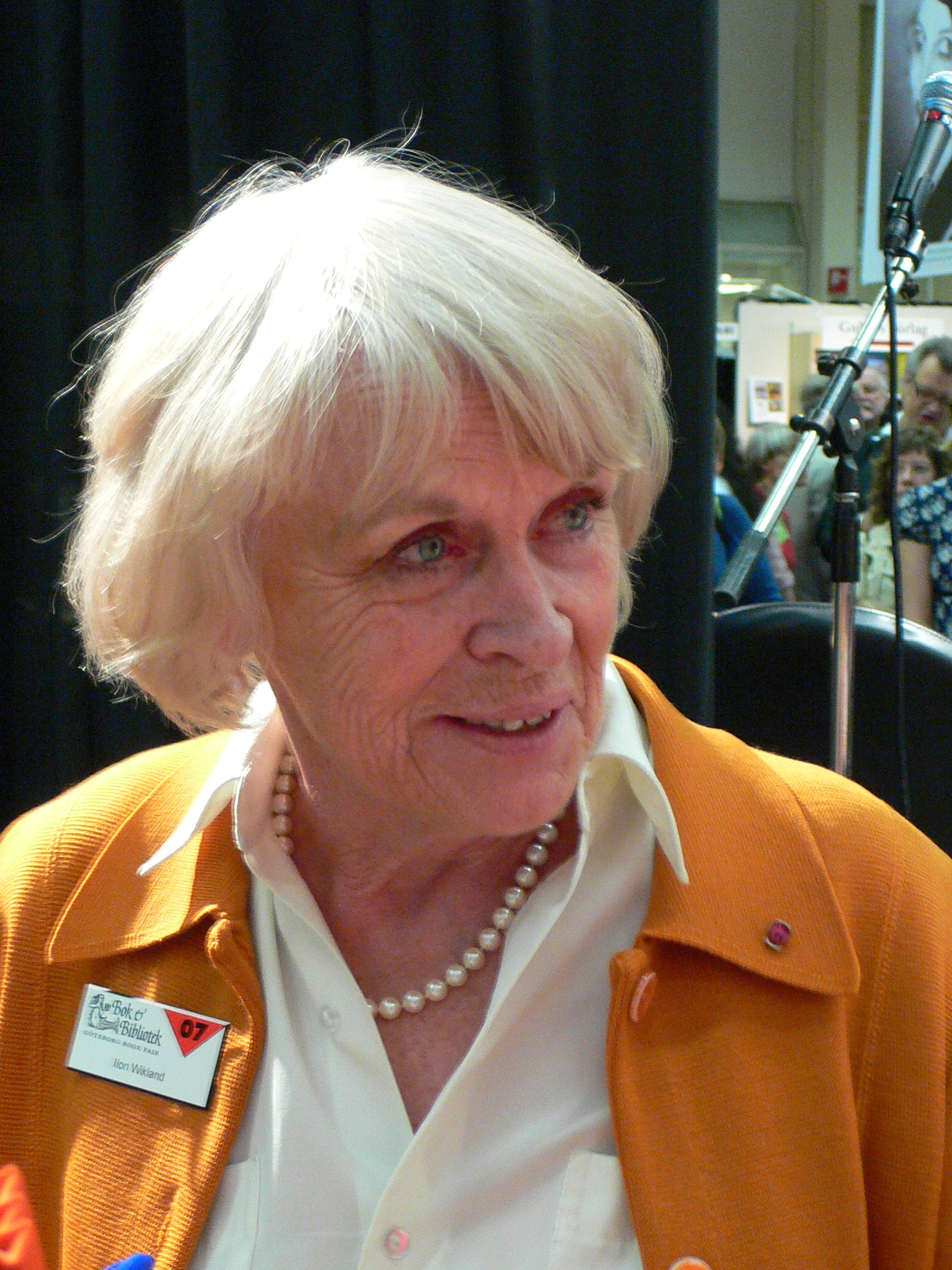
Ilon Wikland, prize winner in 1969

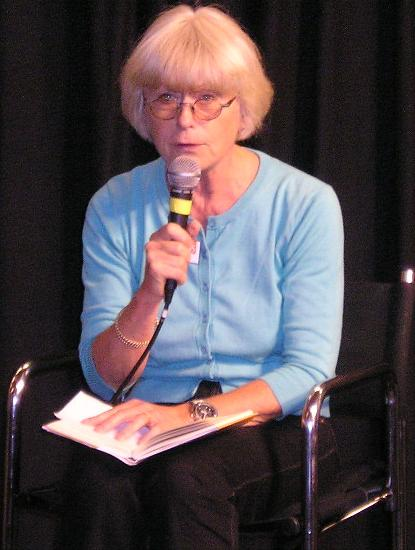
Cecilia Torudd, winner 1983

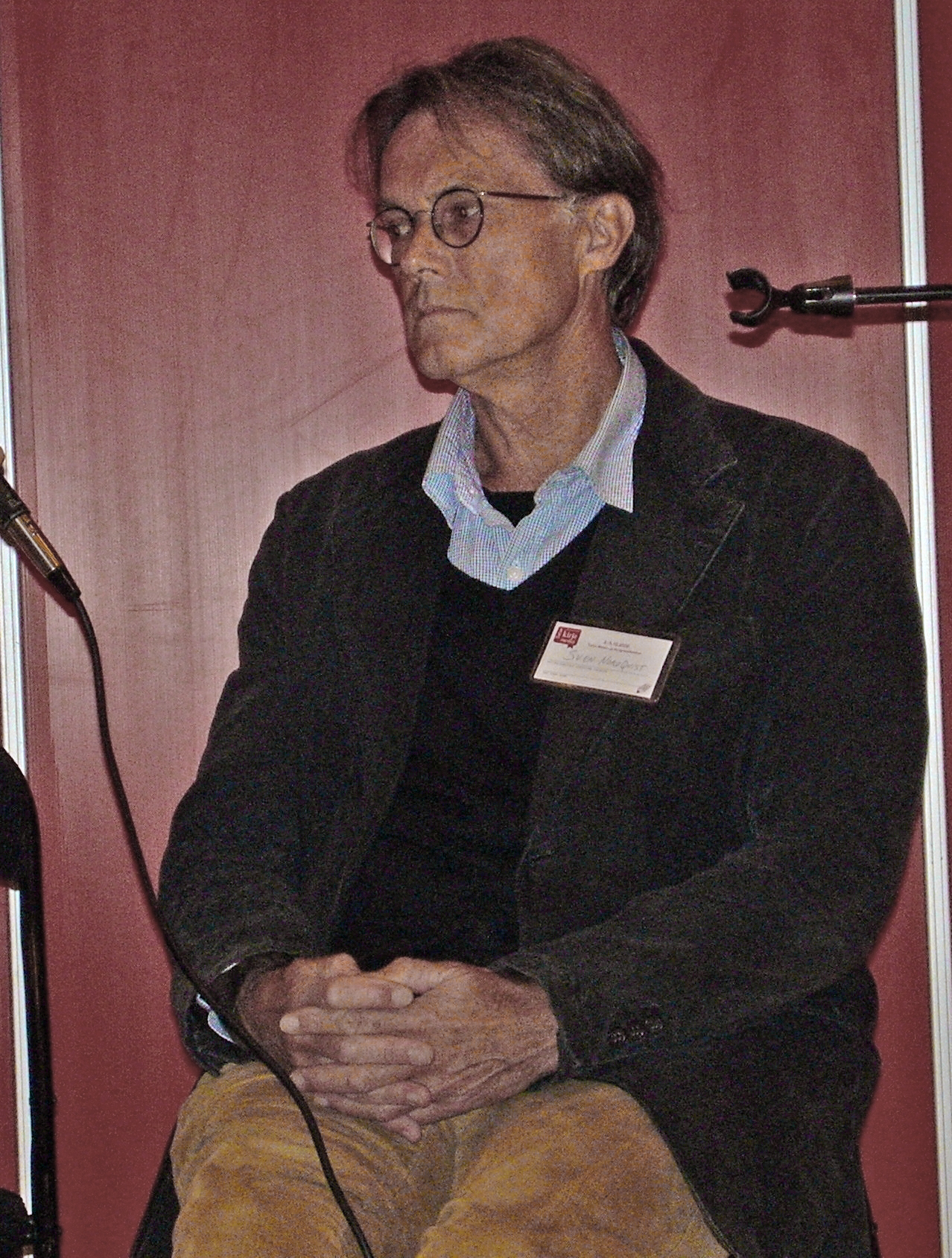
Sven Nordqvist, winner 1989

Year	Award recipients	Original book name	Book name in English
1958	Tove Jansson	Trollvinter	Moominland Midwinter
1959	Martin Lamm	All världens vackra sagor	All the world's beautiful fairy tales
1960	Ulf Löfgren	Barnen i djungeln	Children in the jungle
1961	Eva Billow	Filippa Hallondoft	Filippa Raspberry fragrance
1962	Not awarded this year		
1963	Anna Riwkin-Brick	Overall production	
1964	Fibben Hald	Katten blåste i silverhorn	The cat blew his silver horn
1965	Stig Södersten	Overall production	
1966	Lasse Sandberg	Lilla spöket Laban	Little ghost Laban
1967	Poul Ströyer	Overall production	
1968	Eric Palmquist	Overall production	
1969	Ilon Wikland	Overall production	
1970	Inga Borg	Overall production	
1971	Björn Berg	Emil i Lönneberga and Teskjekjerringa	Emil of Lönneberga and Mrs. Pepperpot
1972	Harald Gripe	Maria Gripes bøker	
1973	Kaj Beckman	Overall production	
1974	Sven Hemmel	Overall production	
1975	Mats Andersson	Overall production	
1976	Harald Wiberg	Den stora snöstormen	Big Snowstorm
1977	Jan Lööf	Skrot-Nisse	Scrap Elf
1978	Thomas Bergman	Vem förstår oss	Who Understands Us
1979	Gunilla Bergström	Ramsor och tramsor om Bill och Bolla	Rhymes About Bill and Bolla
1980	Tord Nygren	Overall production	
1981	Eva Eriksson	Mamman och den vilda bebin	Mother and the Wild Baby
1982	Ann-Madeleine Gelotte	Tyra i 10:an Odengatan	Tyra in 10 Odengatan
1983	Cecilia Torudd	Daghemmet Rödmyran	The Rödmyran daycare
1984	Lena Anderson	Maja tittar på naturen	Maja looks at nature
1985	Bengt Arne Runnerström	Arhuaco Sierra Nevada	Arhuaco Sierra Nevada
1986	Anna-Clara Tidholm	Overall production	
1987	Lars Klinting	Overall production	
1988	Anna Höglund	Jaguaren	The Jaguar
1989	Sven Nordqvist	Gubben og katten and Nasse	The old man and the cat and Piggy
1990	Gunna Grähs	Overall production	
1991	Bodil Hagbrink	Barnen från Tibet	Children of Tibet
1992	Olof Landström	Nisse hos frisören and Herr Bohm och sillen	Elf at the hairdresser and Herr Bohm and the herring
1993	Pija Lindenbaum	Bra Börje	Good Start
1994	Anna Bengtsson	Barnvaktsbarn and Fredrik Matsson blir kär	Babysitter's child and Fredrik Matsson falls in love
1995	Eva Lindström	Gunnar i granskogen	Gunnar in the spruce forest
1996	Lisa Örtengren	Dockvandringen	The puppet walk
1997	Pernilla Stalfelt	Hårboken	Hair book
1998	Mati Lepp	ABCD-boken	The ABCD book
1999	Jockum Nordström	Var är Sailor och Pekka	Where are Sailor and Pekka
2000	Stina Wirsén	Rut och Knut ställer ut	Rut and Knut exhibit
2001	Ann Forslind	Overall production	
2002	Jeanette Milde	När jag mötte Carl Einar	When I met Carl Einar
2003	Jens Ahlbom	Overall production	
2004	Annika Samuelsson	Snurran och den osande abborren	The spinner and the oozing perch
2005	Kristina Digman	Overall production	
2006	Gunilla Ingves	Bøkene om Nalle Bruno	The books about Teddy Bear Bruno
2007	Charlotte Ramel	Overall production	
2008	Staffan Gnosspelius	Gå och bada, Mister Räf!	Go swimming, Mister Fox!
2009	Lotta Geffenblad	Overall production	
2010	Inger Rydén	Den lilla hunden	The little dog
2011	Lena Sjöberg	Tänk om…	What if…
2012	Sara Lundberg	Vita streck och Öjvind	White lines and Öjvind
2013	Emma Adbåge	Lenis Olle and her other production	Lenis Olle and her other productions
2014	Per Gustavsson	Skuggsidan	The shadow side
2015	Annika Thor and Maria Jönsson	Flickan från långt borta	The girl from far away
2016	Viveka Sjögren	Om du skulle fråga Micha	If you asked Micha
2017	Emma Virke	Klä på Herr H.	Dress up Mr. H.
2018	Lisen Adbåge	Samtidigt som and her other production	
2019	Kristin Lidström	Kattvinden	The Tower Room
2020	Alexander Jansson	Tassemarker	
2021	Johan Egerkrans	Overall production	
2022	Jonas Tjäder and Maja Knochenhauer	Bokstavshusen	
2023	Kerstin Elias Costa	Fjärilshuset	
