= Reuterswärd =

Reuterswärd is a surname. Notable people with the surname include:

- Carl Fredrik Reuterswärd (1934–2016), Swedish artist
- Maud Reuterswärd (1920–1980), Swedish writer
- Mikael Reuterswärd (1964–2010), Swedish adventurer
- Oscar Reutersvärd (1915–2002), Swedish artist
- Patrik Reuterswärd (1885–1963), Swedish diplomat
- Pontus Reuterswärd (1871–1949), Swedish military officer
