= Maj =

Maj or MAJ may refer to:

- Major (rank), a rank of commissioned officer in many military forces
- Máj, a romantic Czech poem by Karel Hynek Mácha
- Máj (literary almanac), a Czech literary almanac published in 1858
- MAJ, IATA code for Marshall Islands International Airport

== People ==
- DJ Maj, American Christian music DJ
- Fabio Maj (born 1970), Italian cross country skier
- Maj Bring (1880 – 1971), Swedish painter and model
- Maj Bylock (1931–2019), Swedish writer, translator, teacher
- Maj Sjöwall (born 1935), Swedish author and translator
- Maj Sønstevold (1917–1996), Swedish composer
- Maj Helen Sorkmo (born 1969), Norwegian cross country skier
- Maj Britt Theorin (1932–2021), Swedish social democratic politician and diplomat
- Paulina Maj-Erwardt (born 1977), Polish volleyball player
- Acronym for Muhammad Ali Jinnah (1876–1948), Founder of Pakistan

== See also ==
- May (disambiguation)
