= Anders Holmer =

Swedish writer

- Born: 1977 (age 48–49)
- Occupations: visual artist, architect, writer

Anders Holmer (born in 1977) is a Swedish visual artist, architect, and children's books author.

Holmer debuted in 2017 with the book Allting händer (Everything Happens). His second book, Regn (Rain), was nominated for the August Prize in the category of children's and young adult books in 2018.

== Bibliography ==
2024 - Karavan

2024 - Utflykt

2020 – Farväl (Farewell)

2019 – Inget händer (Nothing Happens)

2018 – Regn (Rain)

2017 - Allting händer

== Awards ==
2025 Winner of "Snöbollen", Swedish picture book of the year

2025 Dpictus 100 outstanding picture books

2024 Dpictus 100 outstanding picture books

2024 - Grammy nominated record by Viktor Skokic

2022 – White Ravens, International Youth Library

2019 – White Ravens, International Youth Library

2019 – Ilon Wikland Scholarship

2019 – Elsa Beskow Plaque – nomination

2019 – dPictus 100 Outstanding Picture Books

2018 – August Prize – nomination

2018 – The Original Art Exhibition, Society of Illustrators, New York City – Juried exhibition

2018 – White Ravens, International Youth Library
