= Per Nilsson (writer) =

Swedish author (born 1954)

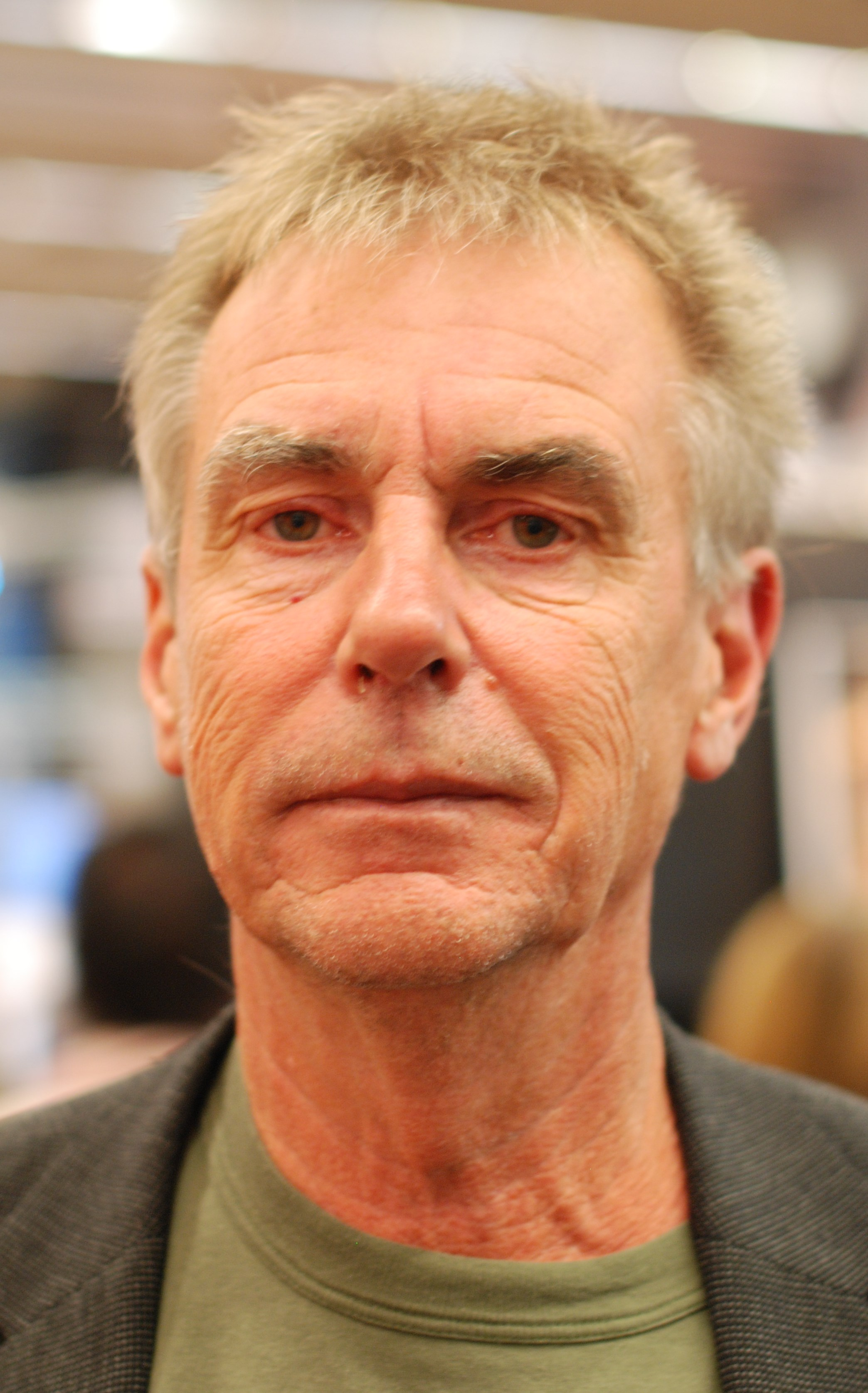
- Nilsson in 2013
- Born: Per Håkan Stefan Nilsson; 13 February 1954 (age 72); Möllevången, Malmö, Sweden
- Occupations: Writer, musician
- Writing career
- Years active: 1986–present

Per Nilsson is a Swedish author. He worked as a music teacher until the summer of 1999, after which he became a full-time author. He has also written the screenplay Hannah with H, based on his early novel Another way to be young. Between 1997 and 2010, he was a Member the Swedish Children's Book College.

== Screenplay ==
- 1992 – Första Kärleken (Based on the novel by)
- 2003 – Hannah With H

== Bibliography ==
Year	Original title	English title	Illustrator	Publisher	ISBN	Ref
1986	Mellan vakna och somna	Between waking and sleep		Bonnier		
1988	Viktiga saker	Important things		NAME Publications	ISBN 9789150100341	
1990	Baklängeslivet	Backwards Life		NAME Publications	ISBN 9789172213883	
1992	Flickan som slutade skolan	The girl who left school	Ingela Almgren	NAME Publications	ISBN 9789177123361	
1993		Loves Me Loves Me Not		Raben & Sjogren		
1993	Ja må han le... Va?	Yes, let him smile...Huh?		Raben & Sjogren	ISBN 9129622204	
1993	Klockan tretton	At three o'clock	Eva Lindström	NAME Publications	ISBN 9789177123682	
1994		Raven's Song		Raben & Sjogren		
1995	Om den sjunde natten	If the seventh night		NAME Publications	ISBN 9789177124962	
1996	Anarkai (German)			Raben & Sjogren	ISBN 9783726005122	
1998	You, You & You	You, You & You		Raben & Sjogren	ISBN 9781932425192	
1998	Hej, Milena (German)	Hi, Milena	Pija Lindenbaum	NAME Publications	ISBN 9783423709187	
1999	Inny niż wszyscy (Polish)	Not like everyone else	Pija Lindenbaum		ISBN 9788377760987	
2000	Anders dan jij (Dutch)	Another way to be young		NAME Publications	ISBN 9789056373726	
2001	Lilla livet, lilla döden	Little Life small death		NAME Publications	ISBN 9789150102499	
2001	Na zawsze Milena (Polish)	Forever Milena	Pija Lindenbaum	NAME Publications	ISBN 9788377761717	
2002	Seventeen	Seventeen		Raben & Sjogren	ISBN 9781932425895	
2002	Aldrig mer Milena?	Never again Milena	Pija Lindenbaum	NAME Publications	ISBN 9789150101973	
2003	Ask & Embla (with Daniel Ahlgren)	Ask & Embla		Raben & Sjogren	ISBN 9789129659290	
2004	Solprinsen			Raben & Sjogren		
2004	Hälften har pinne (with Gunna Grähs)	Half have the stick		NAME Publications	ISBN 9789150104455	
2005		Twins			ISBN 91-29-66221-4	
2006	Svenne			Raben & Sjogren	ISBN 9789170015281	
2007	The return of Hjärtans fröjd	The Return of hearts' joy		Raben & Sjogren		
2009	Absolut Per Nilsson			Raben & Sjogren	ISBN 9789129669602	
2010	I det här trädet (with Catherine Kieri)	This tree		Raben & Sjogren		
2014	Otopia			Raben & Sjogren	ISBN 9789129691054	
2015	Tvåan		Emelie Ostergren	Alfabeta	ISBN 9789150117059	
2022	Majken och Tassa			Alfabeta	ISBN 9789150121919	
2023	En tisdag i paradiset			Alfabeta	ISBN 9789150122633	

== Awards and honors ==
Year	Award/honor	Awarding body	Work	Ref
1994	August-nominated	Swedish Publishers' Association	Raven's song	
1994	Best Love Story	Raben & Sjogren	Valentine's Delight	
1997	Deutscher Jugendliteraturpreis	Federal Ministry of Family Affairs, Senior Citizens, Women and Youth	Hear's De	
1997	Nils Holgersson Plaque	Swedish Library Association	Anarkai	
1998	ABF's Literature			
1998	August-nominated	Swedish Publishers' Association	You & You & You	
1999	Astrid Lindgren Prize	Rabén & Sjögren		
1999	Dutch prize The Silver Kiss		Joy Of Heart	
2000	August-nominated	Swedish Publishers' Association	Another way to be young	
2002	August-nominated	Swedish Publishers' Association	Seventeen	
2003	Expressens Heffaklump	Expressen	Ask and Embla	
2006 – August Prize	Swedish Publishers' Association	Svenne		
2006 – August Prize	Los Angeles Times Book Prize	Los Angeles Times	You & You & You	
