= Siv Widerberg =

Swedish writer (1931–2020)

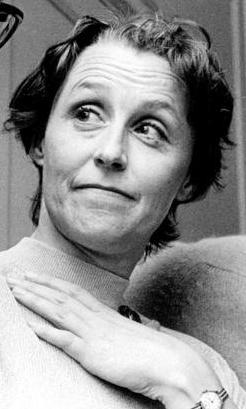
- Born: 12 June 1931; Bromma, Sweden
- Died: 24 December 2020 (aged 89); Stockholm, Sweden
- Occupation: Writer

Siv Widerberg (12 June 1931 – 24 December 2020) was a Swedish writer and journalist. She received an honorary doctorate from the University of Umeå.

Widerberg was born in Bromma. She worked as a teacher (1951–1955) and as a journalist (1955–1965) before becoming a freelance writer. She was a member of the Swedish Academy for Children's Books. Widerberg died on Christmas Eve 2020.

== Works ==
- 1960 – Östergötlands läns hemslöjdsförening 1910–1960
- 1966 – Snart sjutton
- 1966 – Gertrud på daghem
- 1967 – Apropå mej
- 1967 – Åkes trafikskola
- 1968 – Allt möjligt
- 1968 – Se upp, moln!
- 1968 – Alldeles vanliga Hjalmar och Hedvig
- 1969 – Agneta och Björn
- 1969 – En syl i vädret
- 1969 – Min bästa vän
- 1970 – Ett enda stort ljug?
- 1971 – Jag heter Siv
- 1972 – Nya byxor och gamla
- 1973 – Sören och Ingrid
- 1973 – Sitt inte på mej
- 1974 – Vi är många
- 1975 – Folkets kraft är stor
- 1976 – Klass 6 D, Sverige, Världen
- 1977 – Klass 6 D, Sverige, Världen som tårtbitar
- 1978 – Klass 7 A
- 1979 – Men om du inte tror mej
- 1979 – Klass 8 A och B
- 1980 – Flyga ur boet
- 1980 – Nian
- 1980 – Daghemmet Rödmyran
- 1981 – Skriv snart!
- 1983 – Hasse
- 1983 – Som sagt var
- 1984 – Hasses andra bok
- 1984 – Den stora systern
- 1985 – Hasse och den rosa pantern
- 1985 – Varma tassar, vassa tänder
- 1986 – Skriv en dikt (with Gunna Grähs)
- 1986 – Flickan som inte ville gå till dagis (ill. Cecilia Torudd)
- 1987 – Det var en gång en mamma och en pappa
- 1987 – En otrolig historia?
- 1988 – Lek med mej!
- 1989 – Jag är jag
- 1989 – Flickan som gick vilse
- 1989 – Barnbarnsramsor
- 1990 – Pojken och hunden
- 1991 – Hej, mej!
- 1991 – När jag var barn
- 1991 – Plötsligt en dag
- 1992 – Sova över (with Anna-Clara Tidholm)
- 1993 – Andas, finnas, leva livet
- 1994 – Se, så många barn!
- 1996 – Blandade känslor
- 1996 – Bråttombråttom
- 1997 – Nej! Lägg av!
- 1997 – Flickan som inte tyckte om att slåss (with Lisa Örtengren)
- 1999 – Måste vara modig
- 1999 – Så många tårar
- 2000 – Vända livet
- 2002 – Ge hit mobilen!
- 2003 – stolar, stolar, stolar
- 2003 – kuddar, kuddar, kuddar
- 2004 – snö snö snö
- 2005 – Hinkar, spadar, krattor
- 2005 – Räkna med tvillingarna
- 2006 – Ingen är så söt som du ;-)
- 2008 – Valpar till salu
- 2011 – Den långa sömnen

== Prizes ==
- 1968 – Litteraturfrämjandets stipendiat
- 1978 – Nils Holgersson-plaketten
- 1983 – Astrid Lindgren-priset
- 2001 – Gulliver-priset
- 2007 – Rebells Fredspris
- 2011 – Eldsjälspriset
