= Dahlbäck =

Dahlbäck may refer to:

- Björn Dahlbäck (born 1949), Swedish physician and medical researcher
- Jesper Dahlbäck (born 1974), Swedish music producer and DJ
- John Dahlbäck (born 1985), Swedish music producer and DJ
- Helena Dahlbäck (1960–2000), Swedish children's book author
- Herman Dahlbäck (1891–1968), Swedish Olympic rower
