= Christina Björk =

Swedish writer and children's book author

- Born: July 27, 1938 (age 88) Stockholm, Sweden
- Notable awards: Astrid Lindgren Prize (1988); Deutscher Jugendliteraturpreis (1988)

Christina Björk's autograph from the book "Alice's Tale in the Wonderful World of Oxford" (Biblioteca Italiana delle Donne di Bologna)

Christina Björk (born 27 July 1938) is a Swedish writer and children's book author.

She was born in Stockholm and studied at the Graphic Institute there. She then worked as a graphics designer for a magazine; there she met Lena Anderson who would later work with Björk on several books. She next worked in children's television programming for Sveriges Television. From 1975 to 1980, she was editor for the children's page of the Dagens Nyheter newspaper. In 1985, she published Linnea i målarens trädgård with illustrations by Anderson; an English translation Linnea in Monet's Garden was published two years later. The book is now available in more than 15 languages. A short film was later produced with Björk as director.

== Awards ==
In 1988, she was awarded the Astrid Lindgren Prize. In the same year, she was awarded the Deutscher Jugendliteraturpreis for Linnea i målarens trädgård. She is an honorary member of the Swedish Academy for Children's Books.

== Selected works ==
- Linnea Planterar (1978); translated as Linnea's Windowsill Garden (1988)
- Linneas årsbok, children's almanac (1982), received the Deutscher Jugendliteraturpreis, translated as Linnea's Almanac (1989)
- Linnea in Monet's Garden (1985; English translation 1987)
- Sagan om Alice i verkligheten (1993), translated as The Other Alice: The Story of Alice Liddell and Alice in Wonderland (1993)
- Vendela i Venedig (1999), translated as Vendela in Venice, received the Mildred L. Batchelder Award
