= Gunna Grähs =

Swedish children's books illustrator

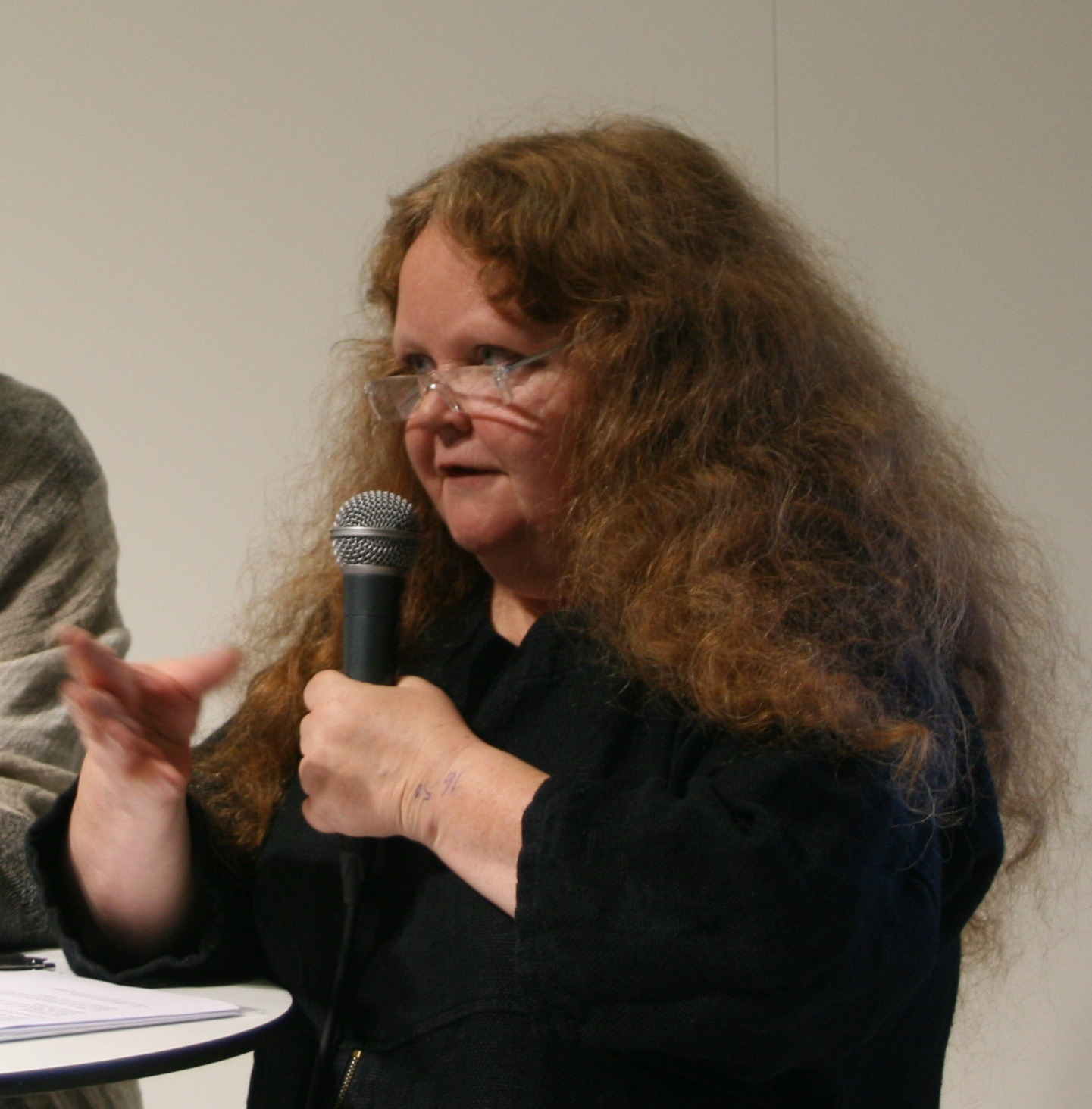
Gunna Grähs, at Göteborg Book Fair.

Lisbeth Gun-Marie Gunna Grähs (born 11 June 1954) is a Swedish illustrator of children's books.

Grähs was educated at Konstfack. She has mainly illustrated children's books, around 40–50 works, but her illustrations have also appeared in newspapers. Grähs was a member of the Swedish Academy for Children's Books from 1996 to 2006. She has been awarded the Elsa Beskow Plaque (1999), the Kulla-Gulla Prize (2012) and Expressens Heffaklump (2010).

== Works ==
- 1982 – Jullan vill vara med (with Kjell Johansson)
- 1983 – Jullan vill ha en docka (with Kjell Johansson)
- 1984 – Ur skägget (with Titti Hasselrot)
- 1984 – Svarta maskens dårdikter (with Anna Myrberg)
- 1984 – En ö i strömmen (with Per Giertz)
- 1984 – Nusse-kudden (with Håkan Jaensson)
- 1984 – Jullan hittar en peng (with Kjell Johansson)
- 1985 – Tandem (with Eva Lindström)
- 1985 – Vidgat utbud (with Leif Pettersson)
- 1985 – Nisse-jakten (with Håkan Jaensson)
- 1986 – Sicken Sven
- 1986 – Nusse-kudden i Paris (with Håkan Jaensson)
- 1986 – Skriv en dikt (with Siv Widerberg)
- 1986 – Vita goa Ludde och andra visor (with Ulla Wiklund)
- 1987 – Det var på tiden (with Per Giertz)
- 1987 – Det underbara dagishemmet (with Gun-Britt Sundström)
- 1988 – Praktisk svenska (with Ulf Bergqvist)
- 1988 – Nusse-kuddens hemlighet (with Håkan Jaensson)
- 1988 – Här kommer tjocka släkten (with Katarina Mazetti)
- 1989 – Kvinnopsykologi (with Mona Eliasson)
- 1989 – Ture går till tandläkaren (with Gun-Britt Sundström)
- 1990 – Den sanna historien om tornen som slog världen med häpnad (with Håkan Jaensson)
- 1991 – Solkatt, vindstrut och vattenhjul (with Pelle Eckerman)
- 1992 – När fan flådde smeden och andra hiskeliga historier (with Ulf Palmenfelt)
- 1992 – Boken om Jullan (with Kjell Johansson)
- 1992 – Mittinattenmysteriet (with Arne Norlin)
- 1993 – Korsdrag i vården (with Karin Alfredsson)
- 1993 – Pojken med stålmansdräkten (with Gun-Britt Sundström)
- 1994 – Puss & dass & pantalong (with Dan Höjer)
- 1994 – Spöket i köket (with Lennart Hellsing)
- 1994 – Nusse-kuddens sista strid (with Håkan Jaensson)
- 1994 – Sverige blandat (with Titti Hasselrot)
- 1995 – Dialogen med patienten (with Elisabeth Bylund)
- 1995 – Kyss & dass & aprilsnarr (with Dan Höjer)
- 1995 – Svenska språket (with Ulf Bergqvist)
- 1996 – Piss & glass & polisong – har också en historia (with Dan Höjer)
- 1996 – Häxdopet och andra hemska historier (with Ulf Palmenfelt)
- 1997 – Jag såg, jag ser (with Håkan Jaensson)
- 1997 – Sagan om den lilla lilla katten (with Thomas Halling)
- 1998 – Den goda demensvården (with Eva Tiwe)
- 1998 – Utveckla dialogen! (with Lillemor Cedergren)
- 1998 – Hur blir det då? (with Håkan Jaensson)
- 1998 – Sagan om den stora stora gubben (with Thomas Halling)
- 1999 – Sagan om det allra allra största (with Thomas Halling)
- 1999 – Kvadrater, hieroglyfer och smarta kort (with Kristin Dahl)
- 2000 – Flört & fjärt & pillefjong – har också en historia (with Dan Höjer)
- 2000 – Katten som en gång kallades Tusse (with Arne Norlin)
- 2001 – Rita ensam hemma (with Håkan Jaensson)
- 2002 – Midsommarnattsmysteriet (with Arne Norlin)
- 2002 – God jul (with Arne Norlin)
- 2002 – Att läsa högt (with Inger Hasselbaum)
- 2003 – Förbättra vården – fråga patienten! (with Elisabeth Bylund)
- 2004 – Hälften har pinne (with Per Nilsson
- 2004 – Johanssons garage (with Thomas Halling)
- 2005 – Barn på kvinnojour (with Ulrika Lorentzi)
- 2005 – Cirkelns pedagogik
- 2006 – Den eller Dinosaurierna lever! (with Lennart Hellsing)
- 2006 – Tutu och tant Kotla, en hejhej-bok
- 2006 – Dino och lilla Kurren, en hejhej-bok
- 2007 – Syrma och Tocke Broms, en hejhej-bok
- 2007 – Praktisk svenska (with Ulf Bergqvist)
- 2008 – Tutu och tant Kotla, en hejhej-bok
- 2008 – Gubben och gumman som bytte arbete
- 2009 – Sagan om den lilla lilla katten (with Thomas Halling)
- 2010 – Mehmet och lilla Luna, en hejhej-bok
- 2012 – Innan proppen går : och andra kväden för hushållsbruk (with Peter Törnqvist)
- 2012 – Det fräscha alternativet
- 2015 – Nusse-kudden (with Håkan Jaensson and Arne Norlin)

== Awards ==
- 1987 – Adamsonstatyetten
- 1988 – Wettergrens barnbokollon
- 1990 – Elsa Beskow Plaque
- 2005 – Knut V. Pettersson-stipendiet
- 2010 – Expressens Heffaklump
- 2012 – Kulla-Gulla Prize
