= Annika Holm =

Swedish author, journalist and dramatist

Annika Birgitta Holm (born 7 August 1937) is a Swedish author, journalist and dramatist. She was the first chair of the Swedish Academy for Children's Books and received the Astrid Lindgren Prize in 1989.

She earned the filosofie kandidat degree in 1960 and worked as a journalist with Dagens Nyheter from 1959 to 1972. She was a member of the Glädje och Sorg theatrical ensemble from 1972 to 1976. She made her literary debut with books on her disabled daughter Vanna. Her books have been translated into ten languages. She was a member of the Swedish Academy for Children's Books from 1989 to 1998 and its first chair, and is now an honorary member.

== Works ==
- 1971 – Plats för Vanna
- 1975 – Våga fråga
- 1976 – Vanna vill stanna
- 1977 – Olles nya cykel
- 1977 – Här vill vi jobba och bo
- 1979 – Rädsla
- 1981 – Att skiljas
- 1981 – Hem till Vanna|Hem tl Vanna
- 1983 – Välja liv
- 1984 – Vänskap, kärlek, svek|Vänsp, kärlek, svek
- 1984 – Fågel Fri
- 1985 – Den föränderliga familjen
- 1985 – Olles hemlighet
- 1986 – Olle och arga Amanda
- 1987 – Kärlek och sex
- 1987 – Drakbarnen
- 1987 – Nyckeln till det oväntade
- 1989 – Boken om Olle
- 1989 – Amanda! Amanda!
- 1991 – Siden och sågspån
- 1991 – Röda Leo och svarta Maja
- 1993 – Mod, Matilda Markström!
- 1993 – Någon som kallar sig jag älskar dig
- 1994 – Hotell Granen
- 1995 – Måns Månsson och änglarna
- 1995 – Stick, sa Matilda Markström
- 1996 – Hur kunde hon!
- 1997 – Den stora oredan
- 1998 – Högtidsboken
- 1999 – Matilda den 13:e december
- 2000 – Blåbärshäxan
- 2000 – Anton och drakarna
- 2001 – Pistolen
- 2002 – Snöänglarnas land
- 2003 – Andra planer
- 2003 – Törnrostaggarnas tid
- 2004 – Adjö, adios! Jag måste hem
- 2006 – Vem tror på häxor?

== Awards ==
- Filmpennan, 1964
- Astrid Lindgren Prize, 1989
- Nils Holgersson Plaque, 1990
- Kulla-Gulla Prize, 2001
