= Lisa Bjärbo =

Swedish writer

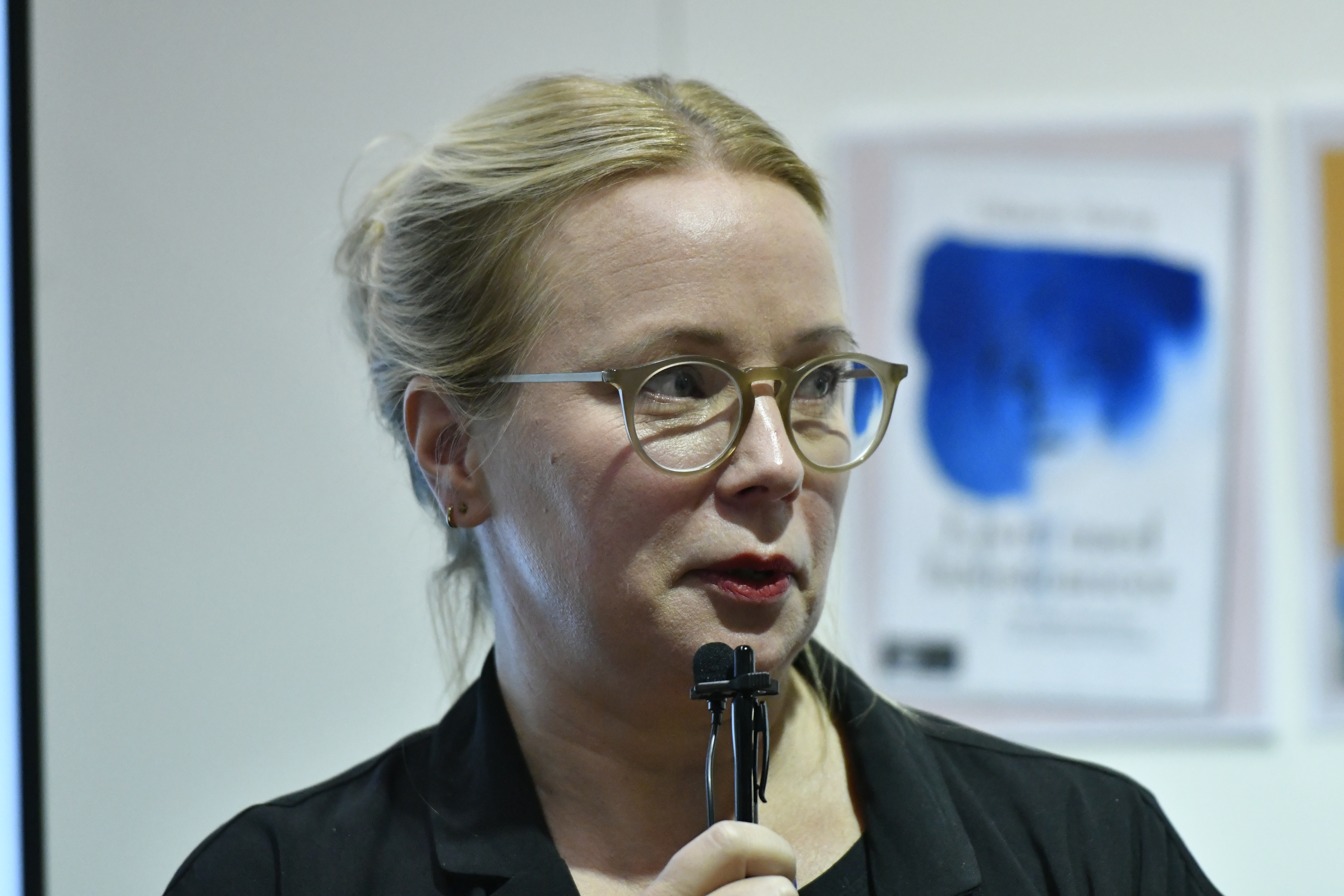
- Lisa Bjärbo in 2024.
- Born: 12 May 1980 (age 45); Växjö, Sweden
- Occupation: Writer
- Awards: Nils Holgersson Plaque (2013); Astrid Lindgren Prize (2018)

Lisa Bjärbo (born 12 May 1980) is a Swedish writer.

== Biography ==
Born in Växjö on 12 May 1980, Bjärbo made her literary debut in 2006, with the non-fiction book Stora Syndboken, jointly with Elin Lindell.

Her books for young adults include the novel Det är så logiskt alla fattar utom du from 2010, Allt jag säger är sant (2012), which earned her the Nils Holgersson Plaque in 2013, Djupa ro from 2015, and Inuti huvudet är jag kul from 2018. She has written the children's books Ivar träffar en pteranodon (2017), and Viggo och rädslolistan from 2018.

In 2018 she was awarded the Astrid Lindgren Prize.
