= Nan Inger Östman =

Swedish author

Nan Inger Östman (22 January 1923 – 8 April 2015) was a Swedish author, primarily of children's literature. She was awarded the Astrid Lindgren Prize in 1987.
