= Karin Anckarsvärd =

Swedish children's author

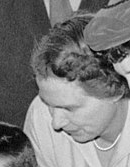
- Karin Anckarsvärd, 4 December 1958
- Born: 10 August 1915; Stockholm, Sweden
- Died: 16 January 1969 (aged 53); Stockholm, Sweden
- Occupation: author

Karin Inez Maria Anckarsvärd, born Olson, (10 August 1915 – 16 January 1969) was a Swedish children's author.

== Biography ==
Anckarsvärd was born in 1915 in Stockholm to Iris and Oscar Olson. Her father was a doctor. She was educated primarily in Sweden, studying at a commercial college in Stockholm except for a year at Oxford University in 1934-35. On returning from Oxford she took up work as a secretary, a position she held until her marriage to Carl Anckarsvärd in 1940.

Anckarsvärd wrote from an early age, with her first story being published when she was only eight years old. Following the birth of her and Carl's five children she began writing stories for children, beginning with her 1952 book, Bonifacius the Green (Bonifacius den gröne in Swedish), which was translated into English by her husband, and which later won a Spring Book Festival Award. Thirteen other books for children followed, including The Robber Ghost which won a Spring Book Festival Award in 1961, and The Doctor's Son (Doktorns pojk’ in Swedish) which won the 1964 Nils Holgersson Plaque awarded by the Swedish Library Association for best Swedish-language children's story. Anckarsvärd also worked as a journalist, and was published in the Swedish newspaper Expressen.
