= Mårten Melin =

Swedish author of children's and youth books

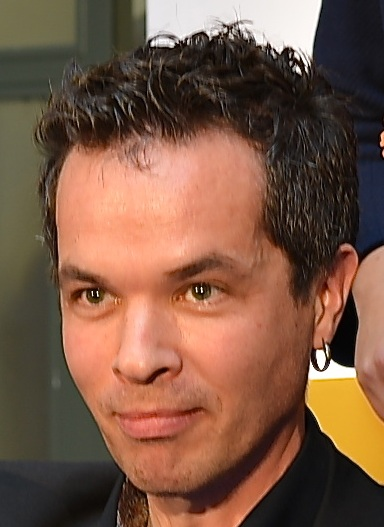
- Melin in 2012
- Born: 9 December 1972 (age 53)
- Occupation: Author
- Writing career
- Notable awards: Astrid Lindgren Prize (2022)

Mårten Adolfsson Melin (born 9 December 1972) is a Swedish author of children's and youth books, who received the Astrid Lindgren Prize in 2022.

== Career ==
Melin trained as a librarian. He made his literary debut in 2003 with the poetry picture book Mera glass i däcken, illustrated by Emma Adbåge. Since then, he has written over hundred books for children and young people. Between 2002 and 2009, Melin also wrote a large number of comics for the newspaper Bamse.

In 2012, Melin's poetry collection Jag er världen was nominated for the August Prize in the category for children's and youth literature. He has been translated into several languages and been a member of the Swedish Academy for Children's Books. In 2019, Melin's short story Mammas lilla prins was nominated for Sveriges Radio's short story prize, and he has been nominated for Barnradion's book prize three times. In 2022, he was awarded the Astrid Lindgren Prize.

== Works ==
- Mera glass i däcken (Eriksson & Lindgren, 2003, illustrated by Emma Adbåge)
- Susanne och den lilla grisen (Eriksson & Lindgren, 2004)
- Svarta kängor med gul söm (Eriksson & Lindgren, 2006)
- Jävla Lucia (Eriksson & Lindgren, 2007)
- Varm tass i mörkret (Hegas förlag, 2007)
- Amor anfaller! (Eriksson & Lindgren, 2008)
- Ett värmeljus i din skalle (Hegas förlag, 2008)
- Jag ser dig (Hegas förlag, 2009)
- Mitt liv som apa (Hegas förlag, 2010)
- Som trolleri (Rabén & Sjögren, 2010)
- Så sjukt kär (Nypon förlag, 2010)
- Du är ett moln (Nypon förlag, 2010)
- Mitt liv som monster (Hegas förlag, 2011)
- Kyssas typ (Nypon förlag, 2011)
- Förvandlad (Rabén & Sjögren, 2011)
- Läskigt nära (Nypon förlag, 2011)
- Aldrig förlåt! (Nypon förlag, 2011)
- Trasig (Hegas förlag, 2011)
- Jag är en häxa (Nypon förlag, 2012, illustrated by Jonas Anderson)
- Häxskolan (Nypon förlag, 2012, illustrated by Jonas Anderson)
- Jag är världen (Hegas förlag, 2012)
- Jag är Love (Rabén & Sjögren, 2012)
- Helt slut (Nypon förlag, 2012)
- Förhäxad (Nypon förlag, 2012, illustrated by Jonas Anderson)
- Häxprovet (Nypon förlag, 2012, illustrated by Jonas Anderson)
- Pappa, var är du? (Nypon förlag, 2012, illustrated by Jonas Anderson)
- Nästan nakna (Nypon förlag, 2013)
- Häxspegeln (Nypon förlag, 2013, illustrated by Jonas Anderson)
- Groda på burk (Nypon förlag, 2013, illustrated by Jonas Anderson)
- Ska vi ses? (Nypon förlag, 2013)
- Unga poeters sällskap (Hegas förlag, 2013)
- Jag är ett litet liv (Hegas förlag, 2013)
- Pixis bok (Rabén & Sjögren, 2013)
- Så grymt skönt (Nypon förlag, 2013)
- Vild kvast (Nypon förlag, 2013, illustrated by Jonas Anderson)
- H som i häxa (Nypon förlag, 2013, illustrated by Jonas Anderson)
- Pinsamt eller? (Nypon förlag, 2014)
- Hjälten (Nypon förlag, 2014, illustrated by Jimmy Wallin)
- Liksom helt magiskt - 12 berättelser (Rabén & Sjögren, 2014)
- Vännen (Nypon förlag, 2014, illustrated by Jimmy Wallin)
- Tjugan (Nypon förlag, 2014)
- Inte vara utan (Nypon förlag, 2014)
- Vampyrjakt! (Nypon förlag, 2014)
- Lite mer än en kram (Rabén & Sjögren, 2014)
- Spökbegravning! (Nypon förlag, 2015)
- Men jag är kär i henne (Nypon förlag, 2015)
- Demonpassning! (Nypon förlag, 2015)
- Mellan dig och mig (Nypon förlag, 2015)
- Mycket mer än en puss (Rabén & Sjögren, 2015)
- Varulvsfeber! (Nypon, 2016)
- Första gången (Nypon, 2016)
- Emma och Måns (Nypon, 2016)
- Hoppa högt (Nypon 2016)
- Välkommen till Skogsbingelskolan (Rabén & Sjögren, 2016, seriealbum med Joakim Gunnarsson)
- Typ helt övernaturligt (Rabén & Sjögren, 2016)
- Springa snabbt (Nypon, 2016)
- Att vara eller inte vara: dikter om dig (Rabén & Sjögren, 2016)
- Flickan på kyrkogården (Rabén & Sjögren, 2016, illustrated by Hanna Granlund)
- Ett spöke i klassen (Rabén & Sjögren, 2016, illustrated by Hanna Granlund)
- Om du går vilse i skogen (with Minna Melin, illustrated by Johanna Kristiansson) (BonnierCarlsen, 2016)
- Pappa, var är du? (Nypon förlag, 2017, illustrated by Jonas Anderson)
- Växtattack! (Nypon förlag, 2017)
- Högsta vinsten (Nypon förlag, 2017)
- Ett spöke sover över (Rabén & Sjögren, 2017, illustrated by Hanna Granlund)
- Om du går vilse på varuhuset (with Minna Melin, illustrated by Johanna Kristiansson) (BonnierCarlsen, 2017)
- Inatt jag drömde (Rabén & Sjögren, 2017)
- Tjejen på skolgården (Nypon förlag, 2017)
- Hand i hand (Vilja förlag, 2017)
- Den fruktansvärda hämnden (Rabén & Sjögren, 2017, illustrated by Hanna Granlund)
- Serum (Vilja förlag, 2018)
- Platt (Hippo bokförlag, 2018, illustrated by Anna-Karin Garhamn)
- Spöktivolit (Rabén & Sjögren, 2018, illustrated by Hanna Granlund)
- Mysteriet på museet (Rabén & Sjögren, 2018, illustrated by Jimmy Wallin)
- Piratens vålnad (Rabén & Sjögren, 2018, illustrated by Jimmy Wallin)
- Den nya mobilen (Nypon förlag, 2018)
- Bodils nya frisyr (Nypon förlag, 2018, illustrated by Maria Borgelöv)
- Det förhäxade huset (Rabén & Sjögren, 2018, illustrated by Hanna Granlund)
- Isdrottningen (Rabén & Sjögren, 2018)
- Det har hänt en sak (Nypon förlag, 2019)
- Bodil och monstret under sängen (Nypon förlag, 2019, illustrated by Maria Borgelöv)
- Du har en chans (Nypon förlag, 2019)
- Kapten Kidds skattkarta (Hippo bokförlag, 2019, illustrated by Johanna Kristiansson)
- Ett spöke fyller år (Rabén & Sjögren, 2019, illustrated by Hanna Granlund)
- Jätteödlans hemlighet (Rabén & Sjögren, 2019, illustrated by Jimmy Wallin)
- Min längtan kvar: dikter om kärlek – tappad och hittad (Rabén & Sjögren, 2019)
- Bodil och hundbajset (Nypon förlag, 2019, illustrated by Maria Borgelöv)
- Husets hjärta (Lilla Piratförlaget, 2019, illustrated by Mattias Olsson)
- Spöke på djupt vatten (Rabén & Sjögren, 2019, illustrated by Hanna Granlund)
- Spökpyssel – rysligt roligt med Spöksystrar (Rabén & Sjögren, 2019, illustrated by Hanna Granlund)
- Stor och liten – urtidsdjur och nutidsdjur (BonnierCarlsen, 2019, illustrated by Lena Forsman)
- Bodil spelar fotboll (Nypon förlag, 2020, illustrated by Maria Borgelöv)
- Tvättstugan (Nypon förlag, 2020, illustrated by Stina Hjelm)
- Akta bajset! (Lilla Piratförlaget, 2020, illustrated by Hanna Albrektson)
- Spöke i fara (Rabén & Sjögren, 2020, illustrated by Hanna Granlund)
- Attack från yttre rymden (Rabén & Sjögren, 2020, illustrated by Jimmy Wallin)
- I kung Kaans klor (Hippo bokförlag, 2020, illustrated by Johanna Kristiansson)
- Spöksomrar (Rabén & Sjögren, 2020, illustrated by Lina Neidestam)
- Bodil på kyrkogården (Nypon förlag, 2020, illustrated by Maria Borgelöv)
- Grannen ovanpå (Nypon förlag, 2020, illustrated by Stina Hjelm)
- Spökhästen (Rabén & Sjögren, 2020, illustrated by Hanna Granlund)
- Det kläckta äggets hemlighet (BonnierCarlsen, 2020, illustrated by Bullas Jonas Jansson)
- Gravens gåta (Lilla Piratförlaget, 2020, illustrated by Mattias Olsson)
- Bodil bakar (Nypon förlag, 2021, illustrated by Maria Borgelöv)
- Inte ens döden (Nypon förlag, 2021)
- Spöket går vilse (Rabén & Sjögren, 2021, illustrated by Hanna Granlund)
- Kapten Blacks hemlighet (Lilla Piratförlaget, 2021, illustrated by Johanna Kristiansson)
- Mammas lilla prins (Rabén & Sjögren, 2021)
- Bodil badar (Nypon förlag, 2021, illustrated by Maria Borgelöv)
- Taket (Nypon förlag, 2021, illustrated by Stina Hjelm)
- Jag ska bara ... (BonnierCarlsen, 2021, illustrated by Hanna Granlund)
- Bodil i full fart (Nypon förlag, 2022, illustrated by Maria Borgelöv)
- Källaren (Nypon förlag, 2022, illustrated by Stina Hjelm)
- Flickan på bryggan (Nypon förlag, 2022)
- Spökljuset (Rabén & Sjögren, 2022, illustrated by Hanna Granlund)
- Samtidigt, inuti (Rabén & Sjögren, 2022)
- Bodil är superhjälte (Nypon förlag, 2022, illustrated by Maria Borgelöv)
- Soprummet (Nypon förlag, 2022, illustrated by Stina Hjelm)
- Piratresan (BonnierCarlsen, 2022, illustrated by Hanna Granlund)
- Skogens slut (Lilla Piratförlaget, 2022, illustrated by Mattias Olsson)
- Ett spöke som barnvakt (Rabén & Sjögren, 2023, illustrated by Hanna Granlund)
- Bodil sportar (Nypon förlag, 2023, illustrated by Maria Borgelöv)
- Hissen (Nypon förlag, 2023, illustrated by Stina Hjelm)
- Pojken på klippan (Nypon förlag, 2023)

== Awards ==
- Astrid Lindgren Prize, 2022
