= Katarina Kieri =

Swedish writer

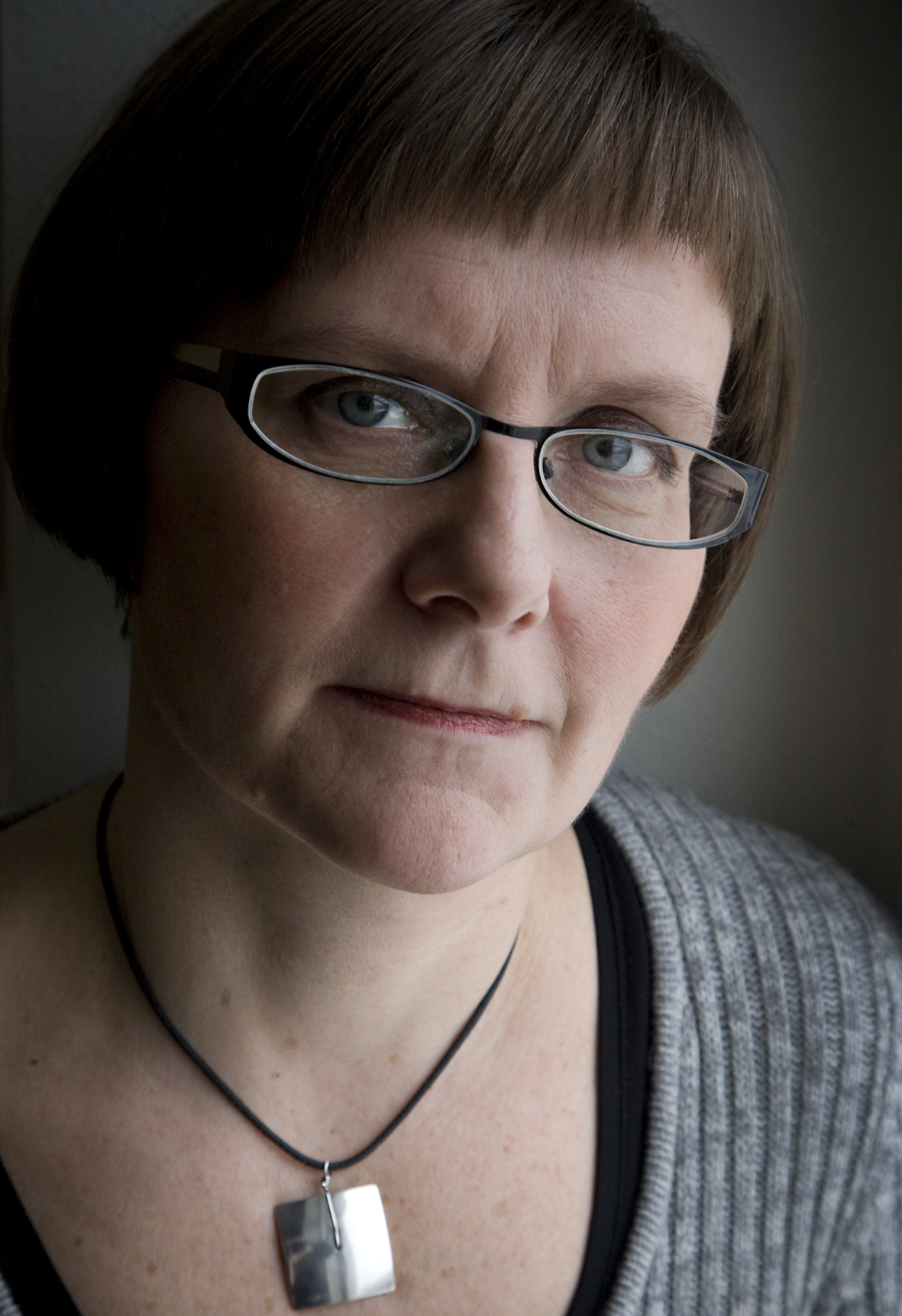
- Born: 15 January 1965 (age 61); Luleå, Sweden
- Writing career
- Genres: youth literature, poetry

Katarina Kieri (born 15 January 1965) is a Swedish writer.

She was born in Luleå and studied recreation education at the Luleå College of Education. She taught for almost ten years and then took a course in creative writing. In 1993, she published a collection of poetry Slutet sällskap ("Private Party"). Kieri has also written columns for newspapers and magazines and worked as a radio broadcaster. She has served on the board for the Swedish Writers' Union and for the Swedish Authors' Fund.

In 2004, she was awarded the August Prize for a young adult novel Dansar Elias? Nej! ("Does Elias Dance? No!"). She received the Astrid Lindgren Prize in 2012 and is now a member of the jury for the Prize.

Kieri is married and has two daughters. She lives in Uppsala.
