= Ann Mari Falk =

Swedish writer and translator (1916–1988)

Ann Mari Falk (December 19, 1916 – July 27, 1988) was a Swedish writer and translator.

The daughter of Ingeborg Larsen and Fritz Söderbergh, she was born Ann-Marie Söderbergh in Stockholm. Her brother Bengt was also a writer. She worked for the insurance company Hansa from 1935 to 1951. Falk published her first novel Fruntimmer in 1944. She later translated children's literature from Danish and Norwegian into Swedish.

Falk won a competition sponsored by publisher Wahlström & Widstrand in 1950. She won the Tidningen Vi:s litteraturpris in 1953 and the Astrid Lindgren Prize in 1968.

She was married twice: first to Jan Falk, a journalist, in 1935 and then to the writer Uno Eng in 1948. Falk and Eng had a son.

Falk died at the age of 71.

== Selected works ==
- Mord i dockskåp graphic novel (1961)
- Madame är död graphic novel (1964)
- Dialog youth literature (1968)
- Måns i Vasastan children's book (1969)
- Min bror Fredrik youth literature (1977)
- Räkna med bråk youth literature (1978)
- När Anton talade sanning children's book (1982)
