= Anna-Clara Tidholm =

Swedish children's writer and illustrator

- Anna-Clara Tjerneld
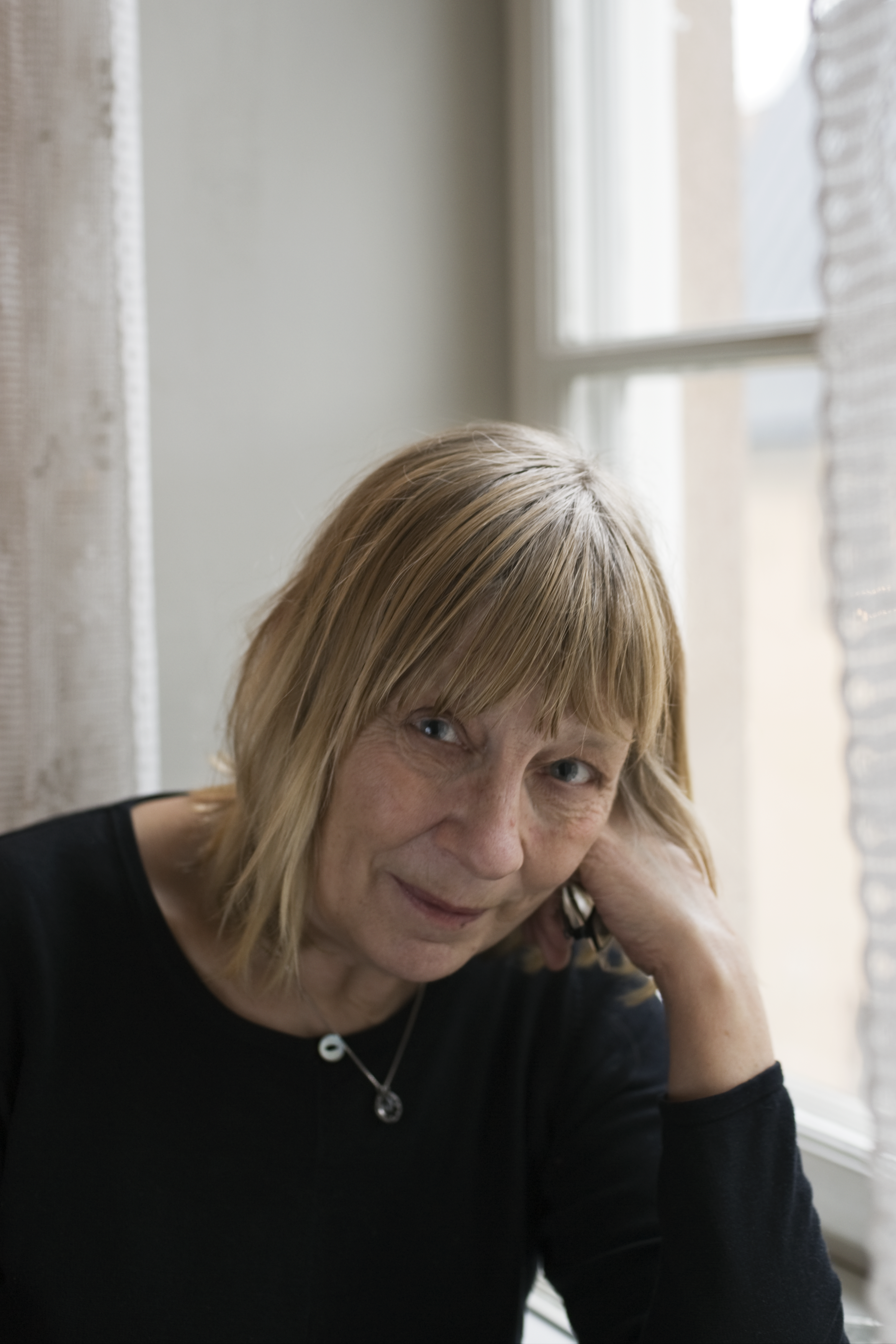
- Born: 7 January 1946 (age 80); Stockholm, Sweden
- Spouse: Thomas Tidholm

Anna-Clara Beatrice Tidholm (born Tjerneld on 7 January 1946 in Stockholm, Sweden) is a Swedish children's writer and illustrator. She grew up on Djurgården in Stockholm. Since 1970, she lives at a small farm in Arbrå.

== Bibliography ==
- Tillbaks till naturen - 1970
- Bolaget, pluttarna och moskrogafolket - 1970 (together with Mats Arvidsson)
- Vad Bosse fick se - 1971 (together with Thomas Tidholm)
- Jätten och ekorren - 1980
- Korven - 1981
- Sagan om osten - 1981
- Pojken och hans ulliga får - 1983
- Åke-boken - 1983 (together with Thomas Tidholm)
- Spårlöst borta - 1984 (together with Ulf Nilsson)
- Glöm inte jordnötterna - 1985 (together with Thomas Tidholm)
- Kanin med nedhängande öron - 1985
- Barnens svenska historia - 1986 (together with Sonja Hulth)
- Arbete, arbetstider och tidsanvändning i tre svenska kommuner - 1987 (together with Ola Sabel)
- Ett jobb för Jacko - 1987 (together with Thomas Tidholm)
- Resan till Ugri La Brek - 1987 (together with Thomas Tidholm)
- Jims vinter - 1988 (together with Thomas Tidholm)
- Ett fall för Nalle - 1988
- Se upp för elefanterna - 1989 (together with Ulf Nilsson)
- Balladen om Marjan och Rolf - 1989 (together with Thomas Tidholm)
- Vill ha syster - 1991 (together with Thomas Tidholm)
- Pojken och stjärnan - 1991 (together with Barbro Lindgren)
- Sova över - 1992 (together with Siv Widerberg)
- Knacka på - 1992
- Förr i tiden i skogen - 1993 (together with Thomas Tidholm)
- Allihop - 1993
- Hitta på - 1993
- Ut och gå - 1993
- Kaspers alla dagar - 1994 (together with Thomas Tidholm)
- Varför då? - 1994
- De älskade film - 1995 (together with Thomas Tidholm)
- Ture kokar soppa - 1995
- Ture blåser bort - 1995
- Lanas land - 1996 (together with Thomas Tidholm)
- Ture skräpar ner - 1996
- En svart hund - 1997 (together with Thomas Tidholm)
- Ture sitter och tittar - 1997
- Nalle hej - 1997
- Ture blir blöt - 1997
- Ture skottar snö - 1997
- Flickornas historia - 1997 (together with Kristina Lindström)
- Ture borstar tänderna - 1998
- Ture får besök - 1998
- Alla djuren - 1998
- Se ut - 1999 (together with Lisa Berg Ortman)
- Långa ben - 1999 (together with Thomas Tidholm)
- Läsa bok - 1999
- Apan fin - 1999
- Kaninen som längtade hem - 1999 (together with Lilian Edvall)
- Flickan som bara ville läsa - 2000 (together with Sonja Hulth)
- Lilla grodan - 2000
- Mera mat - 2000
- Adjö, herr Muffin - 2002 (together with Ulf Nilsson)
- Jolanta - 2002 (together with Thomas Tidholm)
- Hela natten - 2002
- Lite sjuk - 2002
- Jag behöver lillbrorsan - 2002 (together with Solja Krapu)
- Flickornas historia, Europa - 2002 (together with Kristina Lindström)
- Pappan som försvann - 2003
- Alla får åka med - 2004
- Hanna, huset, hunden - 2004
- Väck inte den björn som sover - 2004 (together with Per Gustavsson)
- När vi fick Felix - 2005 (together with Thomas Tidholm)
- En liten stund - 2006
- Det var en gång en räv som sprang i mörkret - 2014 (together with Thomas Tidholm)

== Prizes and awards ==
- Elsa Beskow Plaque 1986 (for ”her entire production”)
- Expressens Heffaklump 1987
- Deutscher Jugendliteraturpreis 1992 (for Resan till Ugri La Brek)
- Wettergren's Children's Book Column 1993
- Astrid Lindgren Prize 1997
- Countryside's Writer's Scholarship 1998
- ABF's Literature Prize 2001
- August Prize 2002 (for Adjö, herr Muffin)
- BMF Plaque 2002
- Book Jury (category 0–6 år) 2002
- Carl von Linné Plaque 2003 (for Flickornas historia, Europa)
