= Åsa Lind =

Swedish children's and youth book author (born 1958)

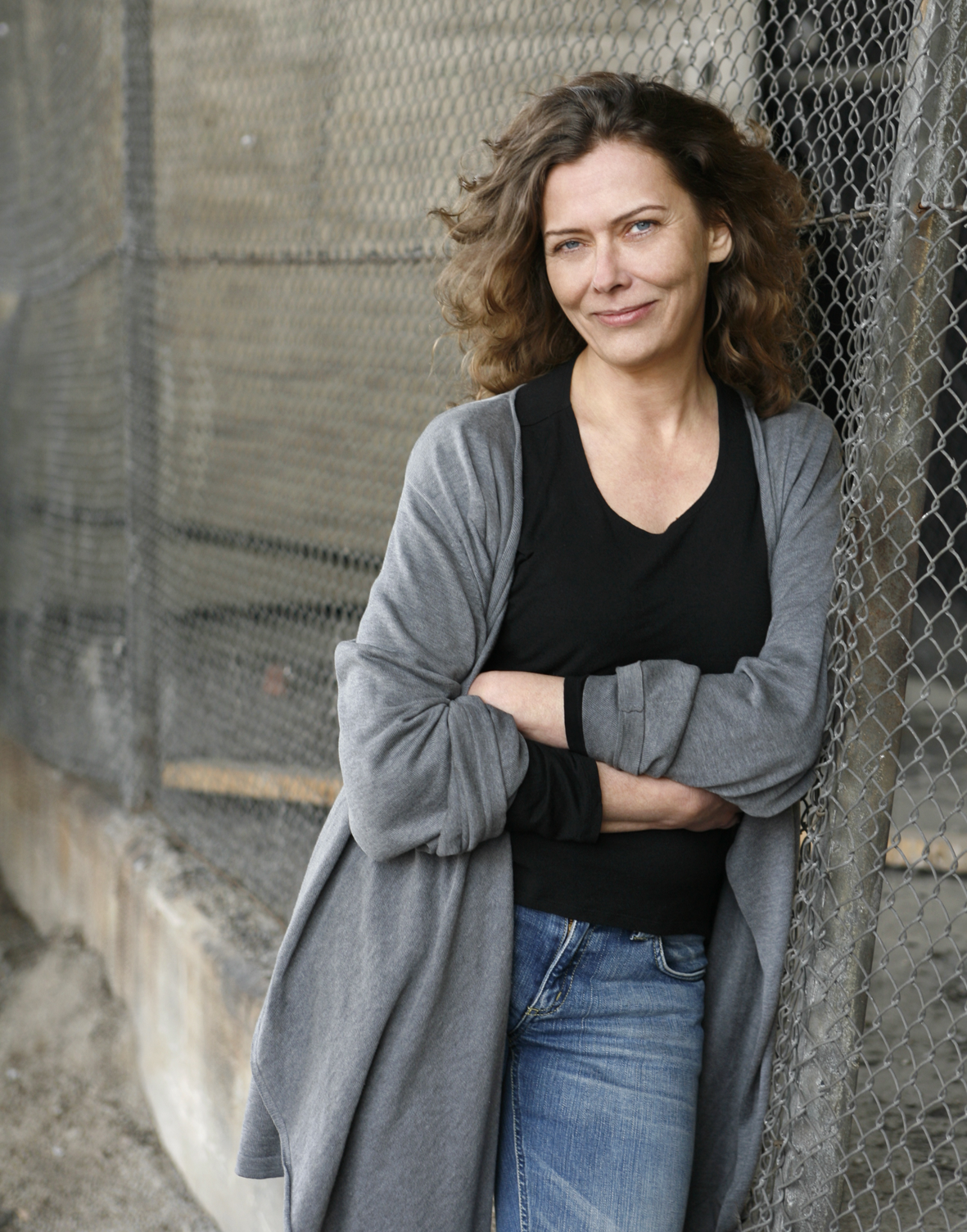
Åsa Lind

Åsa Lind (born 1958 in Karbäcken in Tåsjö parish in Ångermanland) is a Swedish children's and youth book author.

Lind lives in Stockholm. She has previously worked as a journalist and in a restaurant but is now a full-time writer. Lind was awarded the Nils Holgersson plaque in 2003 and received the Kulla-Gulla Prize in 2014. Lind is a member of the Swedish Academy for Children's Books.

== Bibliography ==
- 1995 - Troll-Tula och Nisse
- 1998 - Your own flora (illustrator with Maj Fagerberg)
- 2001 - Rock, stone and sand
- 2002 - The Sand Wolf (translated into eighteen languages, including Korean, German and Turkish)
- 2002 - Angels exist (illustration Sara Lundberg)
- 2003 - Mera Sandvargen
- 2004 - The Sand Wolf and all the glory
- 2004 - Princess Book
- 2005 - "Abracadabra"
- 2008 - Ellika Tomson's first book
- 2009 - The Book of Chance
- 2009 - Dunderlund's best letter (illustrator with Sara Lundberg)
- 2012 - Grandma's shawl (illustrator with Joanna Hellgren)
- 2014 - Excursion book for rhymes and rhymes (illustrator Anna Bengtsson)
- 2014 - The Secret (illustrator Emelie Östergren)
- 2015 - Opus Olsson and the Brothers of Death
- 2015 - Äskil eats trees
- 2016 - Dodo and Diamond eat biscuits (illustrator Malin Koort)
