= Helena Östlund =

Swedish writer (born 1971)

Helena Axelsson Östlund (née Axelsson) (born 11 April 1971) is a Swedish children's writer.

Östlund grew up in Västerås. She made her debut with Suck Puck Päck in 1995 at Eriksson & Lindgren publishing house. Östlund's stories focus on sometimes surreal everyday adventures. During the 1990s, she studied at Konstfack in Stockholm and began training in interior architecture as well as graphic design and illustration. Östlund has an art teacher's degree from Konstfack. She was awarded the Astrid Lindgren Prize in 2007.

Östlund has been working as a high school teacher in aesthetic subjects at Grillska gymnasium in Västerås.

== Works ==
- 1995 – Suck Puck Päck (Eriksson & Lindgren)
- 1999 – Puck + Pedda = falskt (Eriksson & Lindgren)
- 2000 – P som i Puck som i Party! (Eriksson & Lindgren)
- 2002 – Jerker (Bonnier Carlsen)
- 2003 – Jerker och tjejerna (Bonnier Carlsen)
- 2005 – Jerker – första spelningen (Bonnier Carlsen)
- 2007 – Joy och önskeburken (Rabén & Sjögren)
- 2008 – Flykten från Nova (ljudbok, Wela förlag)
- 2008 – Joy och snigelriket (Rabén & Sjögren)
- 2009 – Joy och hockeykillarna ( Rabén & Sjögren)
- 2010 – Flykten från Nova (Wela)
- 2012 – Aiko på jorden (Wela)
- 2014 – Aska (Liguster)
- 2022 - Sherman Shapeshifter

== Awards ==
- Astrid Lindgren Prize, 2007
