= Lena Landström =

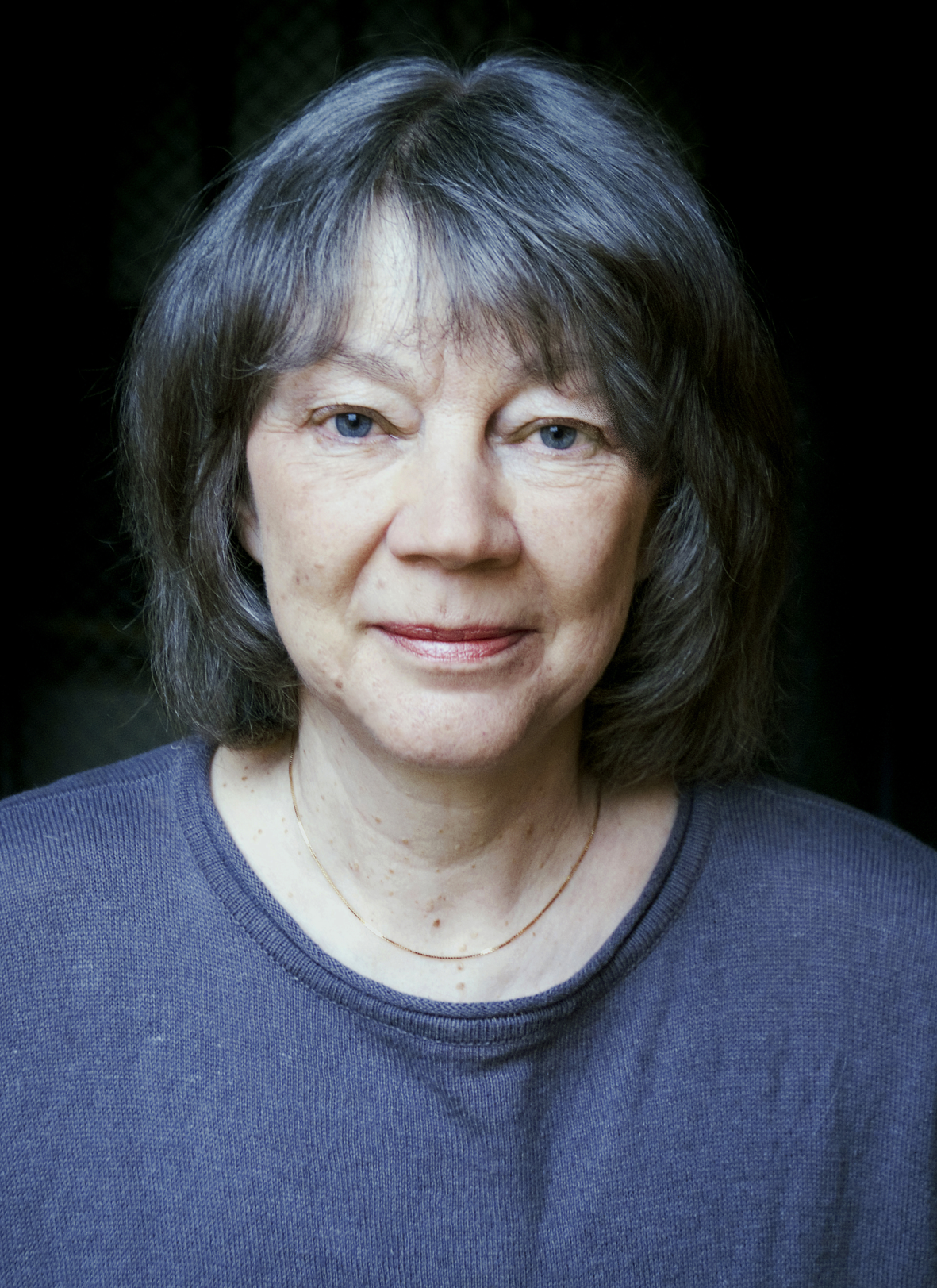
Lena Landström

Lena Marie Landström (born 12 July 1943) is a Swedish children's writer and illustrator. She was a joint recipient of the Astrid Lindgren Prize in 2009, with her husband and frequent collaborator Olof Landström.

== Life and career ==
She studied fashion at Anders Beckman's School of Design, 1966–1969. In 1969, she met her future husband Olof Landström, with whom she also collaborated.

In the early 1970s, at the film company POJ, Lena Landström participated in the script work for the animated TV series Kalles klätterträd together with Peter Cohen and Olof Landström. She also painted the backgrounds for most of the film company's animated films.

Together with Olof, she has written the books about Nisse, Bu och Bä, Fyra hönor och en tupp and Pom och Pim. In 1993, she published the picture book En flodhästsaga, that has been translated into several languages. She has also collaborated with Veronica Wägner.

== Awards ==
- BMF-Barnboksplaketten, 1992, with Olof Landström, for Nisse på stranden
- Expressens Heffaklump, 2006, with Olof Landström, for Bu och Bä får besök
- Astrid Lindgren Prize, 2009, with Olof Landström
