= Ulf Nilsson (author) =

Swedish writer (1948–2021)

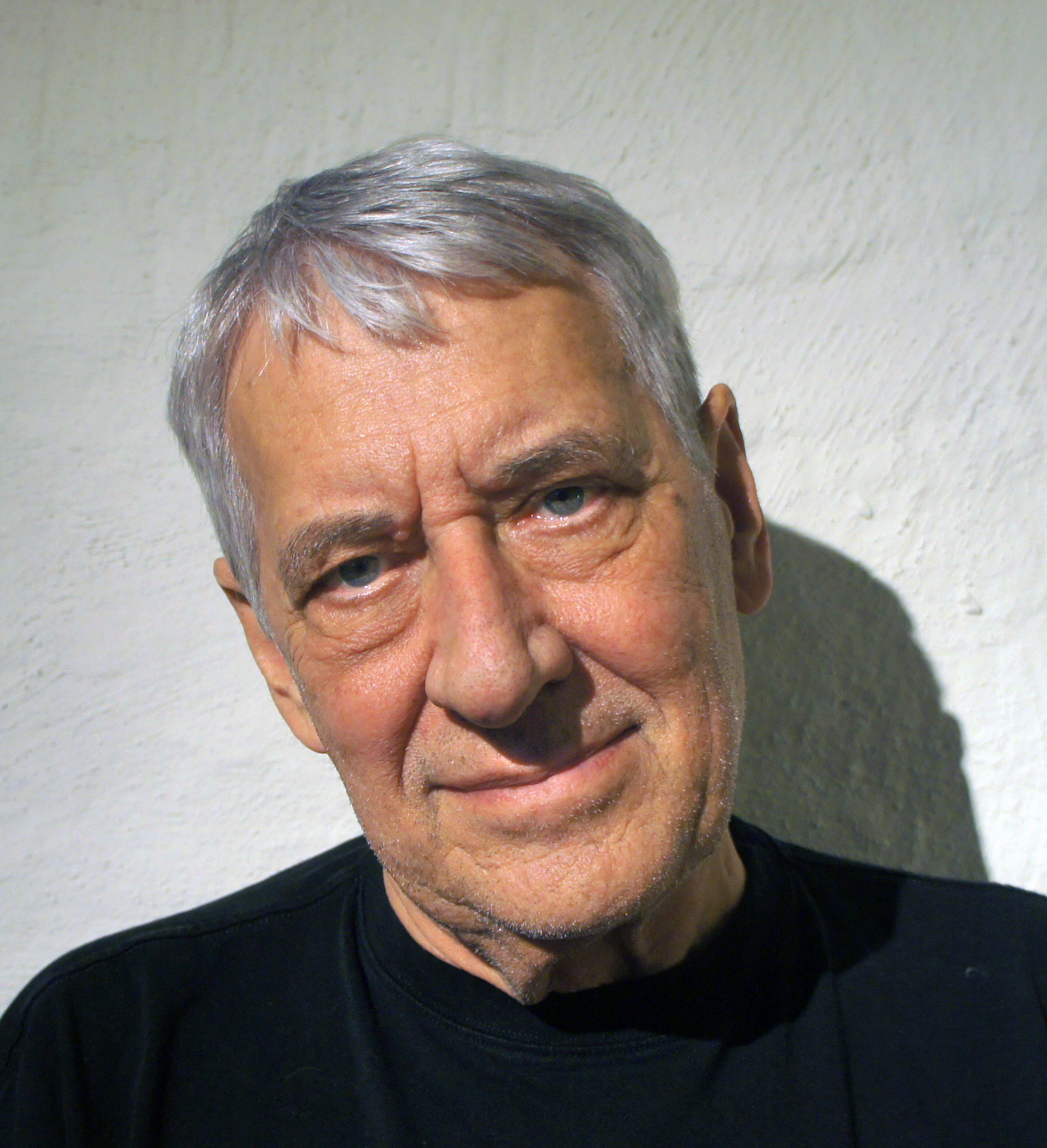
- Nilsson in 2016
- Born: 18 September 1948; Helsingborg, Sweden
- Died: 22 September 2021 (aged 73)
- Occupation: Writer
- Writing career
- Language: Swedish
- Period: 1979–2021
- Genre: Children-youth

Ulf Lennart Nilsson (18 September 1948 – 22 September 2021) was a Swedish writer who published more than 100 books and picture books, geared mainly to children and adolescents. He was also the longtime president of the Swedish Academy for Children's Books. A number of his works have been translated into English by Gecko Press.

Nilsson died on 22 September 2021, at the age of 73.

== Books ==
- 1979 – Pojkjävlarna
- 1982 – Älskade lilla gris
- 1983 – Lilla syster Kanin (together with Eva Eriksson)
- 1983 – En kamp för frihet
- 1985 – If You Didn't Have Me (Swedish: Om ni inte hade mig)
- 1985 – Den fräcka kråkan
- 1986 – Boeing 747 (together with Pija Lindenbaum)
- 1994 – Mästaren och de fyra skrivarna
- 1996 – En dag med mössens brandkår
- 2001 – Varg nosar och jagar
- 1998 – En frälsare är född
- 2002 – Adjö, herr Muffin (together with Anna-Clara Tidholm)
- 2004 – En ängel vid din sida
- 2005 – En halv tusenlapp (together with Filippa Widlund)
- 2005 – Liten mus trycker på knappar
- 2006 – Den döde talar
- 2006 – Lilla syster kanin går alldeles vilse
- 2006 – Alla döda små djur
- 2007 – Ensam bland rävar

=== English translations ===
- 2006 – All the Dear Little Animals, (Gecko Press) 32pp., ISBN 978-0-958259-88-0
  - 2020 – All the Dear Little Animals, chapter book edition (Gecko Press) 64pp., ISBN 978-1-776572-82-3
- 2015 – Detective Gordon: The First Case, (Gecko Press) 96pp., ISBN 978-1-927271-69-8
- 2016 – Detective Gordon: A Complicated Case, (Gecko Press) 96pp., ISBN 978-1-776570-65-2
- 2017 – Detective Gordon: A Case in Any Case, (Gecko Press)108pp., ISBN 978-1-776571-09-3
- 2018 – Detective Gordon: A Case for Buffy, (Gecko Press) 112pp., ISBN 978-1-776571-79-6

=== Spanish translations ===
- 2021 – Inspector Gordon. El primer caso, (HarperCollins) 96pp., ISBN 978-8-418279-65-2

== Awards ==
Nilsson has received the August Prize (Augustpriset) twice, the only writer for children and young adults to have been so recognized, and a distinction he shares with only four other writers for readers of any age.

- 1983 – BMF-plaketten (jointly with illustrator Eva Eriksson) for Lilla syster kanin
- 1984 – Nils Holgersson-plaketten for Lilla syster Kanin and En kamp för frihet
- 1985 – Expressens Heffaklump for Om ni inte hade mig and Den fräcka kråkan
- 1994 – Augustpriset for Mästaren och de fyra skrivarna
- 2002 – Augustpriset for Adjö, herr Muffin
- 2002 – BMF-plaketten
- 2002 – Bokjuryn (category 0–6 years)
- 2006 – The Astrid Lindgren Prize for his authorship of child and youth literature
- 2010 – Schullströmska prize for Children's Literature
