= Katarina von Bredow =

Swedish writer

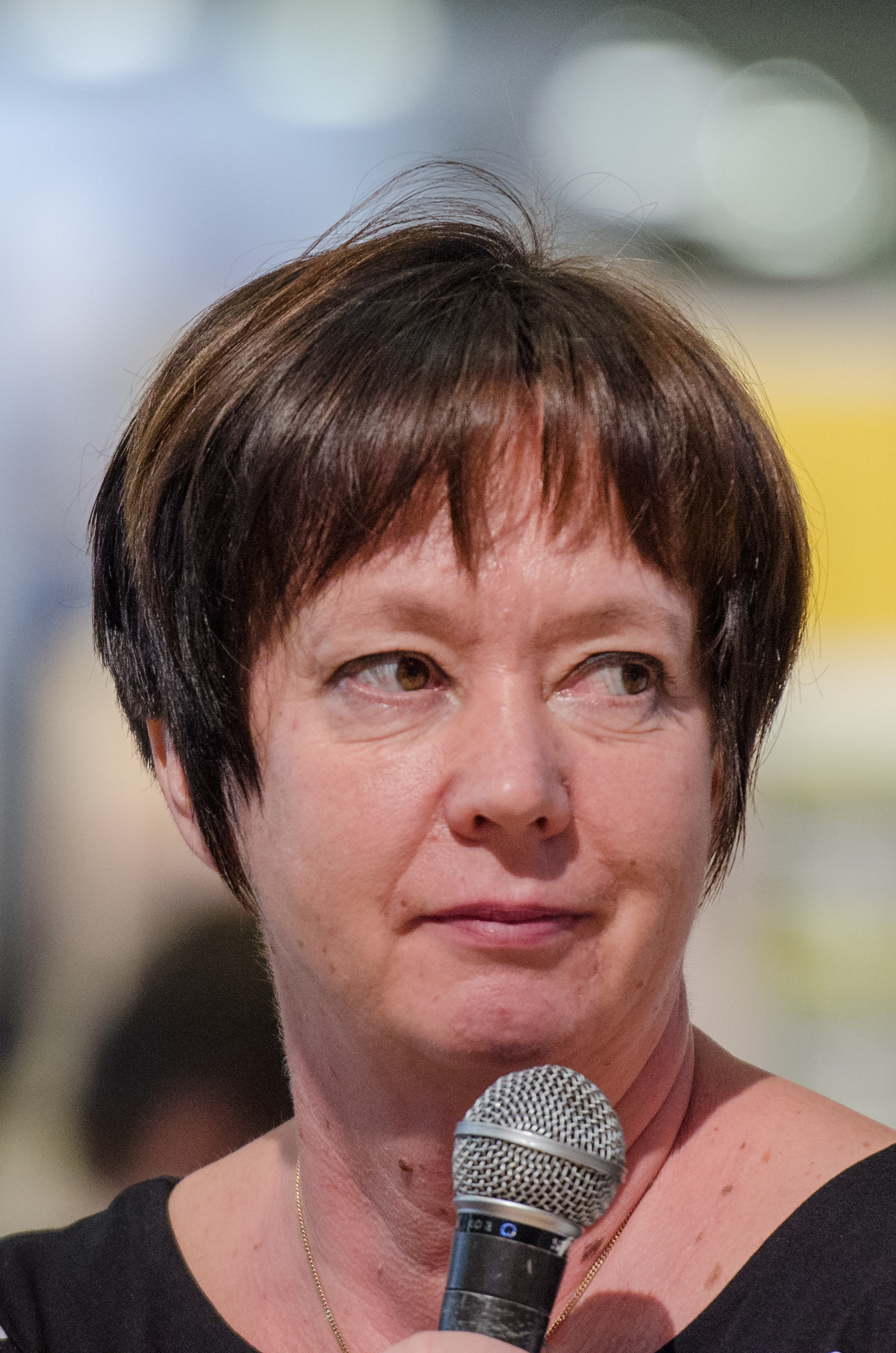
- Born: 16 February 1967 (age 58); Aneby, Småland, Sweden
- Occupation: Writer
- Awards: Astrid Lindgren Prize (2013)

Katarina von Bredow (born 16 February 1967) is a Swedish writer.

== Biography ==
Born in Aneby, Småland on 16 February 1967, von Bredow made her literary debut in 1991 with the novel for young adults, Syskonkärlek.

Further books are Knappt lovlig from 1996, Som om ingenting (1999), and Bara inte du (2009). She has written the trilogy Du & jag, Hon & han, and Han & dom (2013 to 2015), and a second trilogy, Ellinor, Leo and Viktor (2018 to 2019).

She was awarded the Astrid Lindgren Prize in 2013.
