= Kerstin Lundberg Hahn =

Swedish author

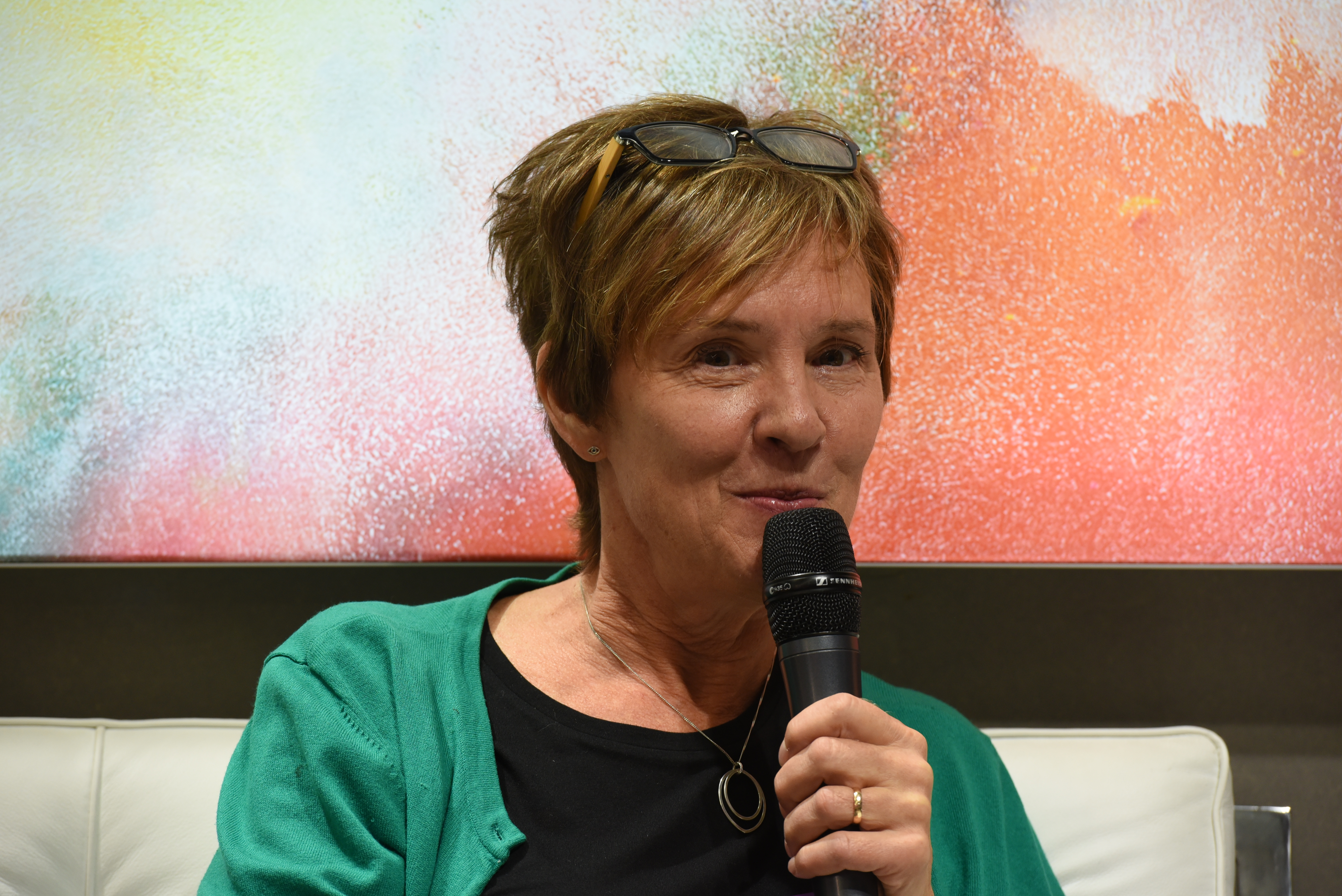
Image of Kerstin Lundberg Hahn

Kerstin Lundberg Hahn (born 22 April 1962) is a Swedish author of children's and youth books. She was awarded the Astrid Lindgren Prize in 2019.

Kerstin Lundberg Hahn grew up in Tavelsjö in Västerbotten. Later she moved to Gothenburg. She trained and worked as a teacher. During that time, she wrote teaching materials for Swedish as a second language.

She made her literary debut as a children's writer with the book Kajsa och fågeltjuvarna in 2000. This marked the start of her series of detective stories about Kajsa and Johan. She has also written several other books for children and youth, such as Vitas hemlighet (2010; illustrated by Maria Nilsson Thore) and the ghost story Skuggan i väggen (2012).

== Works ==
- Kajsa och fågeltjuvarna (illustrated by Jens Ahlbom), Rabén & Sjögren, 2000 ISBN 91-29-65266-9 (later published as Fågeltjuvarna)
- Kalla diamanter (illustrated by Jens Ahlbom), Rabén & Sjögren, 2002 ISBN 91-29-65682-6
- Misstänkt ljus (illustrated by Jens Ahlbom), Rabén & Sjögren, 2003 ISBN 91-29-65857-8
- Det glömda guldet (illustrated by Jens Ahlbom), Rabén & Sjögren, 2004 ISBN 91-29-66073-4
- Falska ansikten (illustrated by Jens Ahlbom), Rabén & Sjögren, 2006 ISBN 91-29-66257-5
- Bakom masken, Rabén & Sjögren, 2008 ISBN 9789129669251
- Svart bälte, Rabén & Sjögren, 2009 ISBN 978-91-29-66982-4
- Stormens ögon, Rabén & Sjögren, 2009 ISBN 978-91-29-67062-2
- Vitas hemlighet (illustrated by Maria Nilsson Thore), Rabén & Sjögren, 2010 ISBN 9789129672916
  - (in French) La secret de Vita (translators: Annelie Jarl Ireman and Jean Renaud), Bayard, 2013 ISBN 9782747037945
- Skuggan i väggen, Rabén & Sjögren, 2012 ISBN 978-91-29-68123-9
  - (in Danish) Skyggen i væggen (översättare: Marie Østergaard Knudsen), Høst & søn, 2013 ISBN 9788763827713
  - (in German) Der Schatten an meiner Wand (translator: Gabriele Haefs), Aladin, 2014 ISBN 9783848920266
- Lyckokakan (illustrated by Maria Nilsson Thore), Rabén & Sjögren, 2013 ISBN 9789129685749
- Barnkolonin, Rabén & Sjögren, 2013 ISBN 978-91-29-68727-9
  - (in Danish) Feriekolonien (översättare: Erik Egholm), ABC, cop. 2014 ISBN 9788779162440
- Drömbärarna, Rabén & Sjögren, 2014 ISBN 9789129691610
- Fröken Spöke (illustrated by Åsa Rosén), Nypon, 2015 ISBN 9789175672717
