= Rose Lagercrantz =

Swedish writer (born 1947)

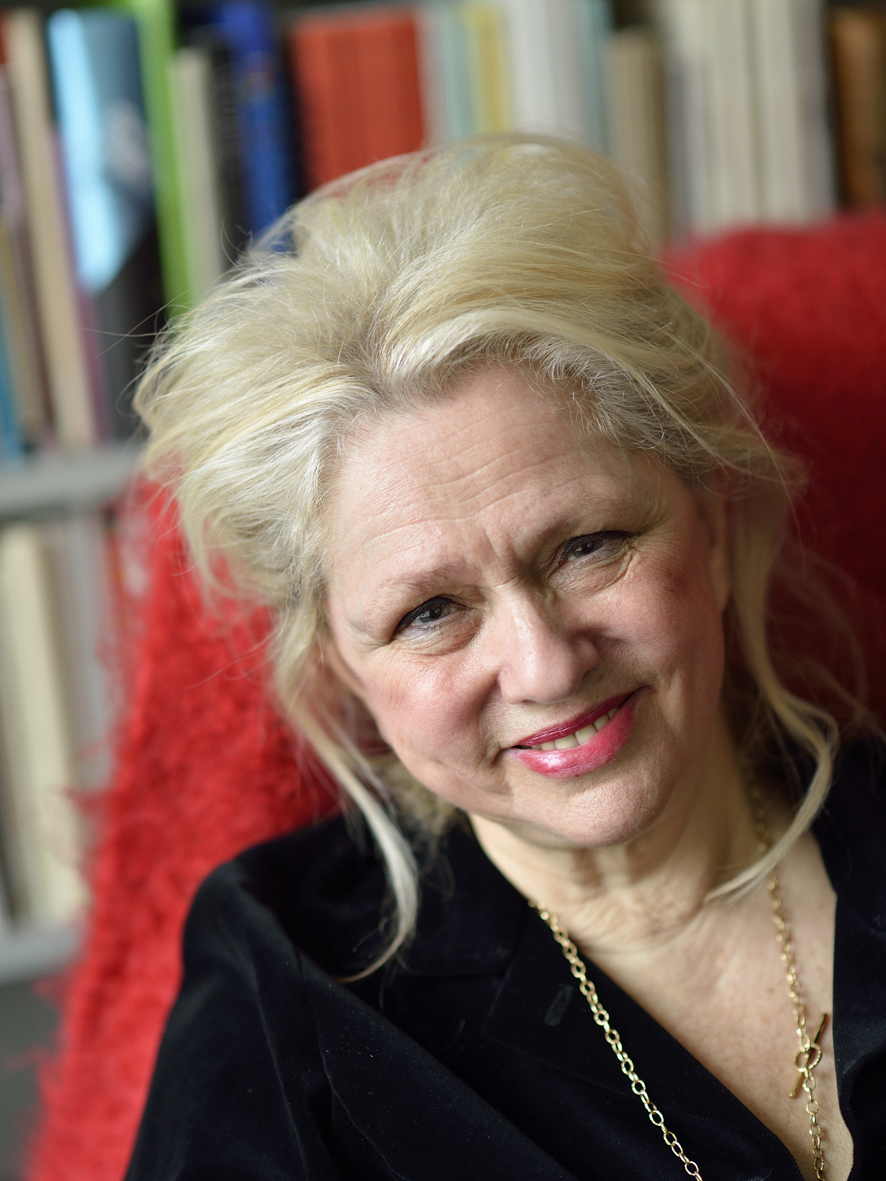
- Rose Lagercrantz
- Born: 1947 (age 78–79); Stockholm, Sweden
- Occupation: Writer
- Writing career
- Language: Swedish

Rose Lagercrantz (born in Stockholm in 1947) is a Swedish writer for children and adults.

Her first book was published in 1973, and she has since had her work translated into English, German, Korean, Japanese, Italian, Ukrainian, Russian, Slovak and Hebrew.

== Books (selection) ==
- 2010 – Mitt lyckliga liv
- 2012 – Om man ännu finns
- 2012 – Mitt hjärta hoppar och skrattar (illustrated by Eva Eriksson)
- 2012 – Födelsedagsbarnet (illustrated by Rebecka Lagercrantz)
- 2013 – Julbarnet (illustrated by Rebecka Lagercrantz)
- 2013 – Barnvakten (illustrated by Rebecka Lagercrantz)
- 2014 – Sist jag var som lyckligast (illustrated by Eva Eriksson)
- 2015 – Livet enligt Dunne

=== English translations ===
- 2012 – My Happy Life, (Gecko Press) 136pp., ISBN 978-1-877467-80-6
- 2014 – My Heart is Laughing, (Gecko Press) 120pp., ISBN 978-1-877579-51-6
- 2015 – When I Am Happiest, (Gecko Press) 128pp., ISBN 978-1-927271-89-6
- 2016 – Life According to Dani, (Gecko Press) 108pp., ISBN 978-1-776570-71-3
- 2017 – See You When I See You, (Gecko Press) 152pp., ISBN 978-1-776571-30-7
- 2019 – Where Dani Goes, Happy Follows, (Gecko Press) 184pp., ISBN 978-1-776572-25-0
- 2020 – All's Happy That Ends Happy, (Gecko Press) 224pp., ISBN 978-1-776572-92-2

== Awards (selection) ==
- 1979 – Astrid Lindgren Prize
- 1980 – Nils Holgersson Plaque
- 1988 – Expressens Heffaklump
- 1992 – Vi Magazine Literature Prize
- 1995 – August Prize
