= Helena Dahlbäck =

Swedish author (1960–2000)

Helena Dahlbäck (1960–2000) was a Swedish author who wrote several children's books, such as My Sister Lotta and Me.

My Sister Lotta and Me was translated into English by Rika Lessar in 1993 and published by Henry Holt & Co. (ISBN 0-8050-2558-8). It was illustrated by Charlotte Ramel, who also illustrated The Cake Book, published by Sprall Publishing, Sweden. In 1996, she was the Nils Holgersson Plaque laureate.

During the 1990s, she shared her time between writing, cultural pedagogical work with children, reading and literature promotion work and her family. She debuted in 1991 with the book My Sister and I who came to be followed by about twenty books. She described this writing process herself as "it was as if my entire secret childish soul life began to bubble over in all directions. I couldn't stop it!".
