= Inger Brattström =

Swedish writer

- Born: August 27, 1920
- Died: May 17, 2018 (aged 97)
- Genre: young adult fiction
- Notable awards: Nils Holgersson Plaque (1967)

Inger Brattström (August 27, 1920 – May 17, 2018) was a Swedish writer. She was the winner of the Nils Holgersson Plaque in 1967. She is the author of more than 40 books, among them the Dutch translated book Unn en de grotten. Many of her books have been translated into German (Das Wunschpferd, Solong und der Zaubrer, Ambika im Tempel der Gottin, Der Schleier, Mädchen von damals, Seit jener Party).

Her mother Lisa Högelin wrote girl books and her father Gösta Högelin animal books and boy books. She graduated in 1940 and studied psychology at Stockholm University 1952–1953.

== Young adult book translated into English ==
- Since That Party, 1970 (translated by Eve Barwell)
