= Maud Reuterswärd =

Swedish author and radio presenter (1920–1980)

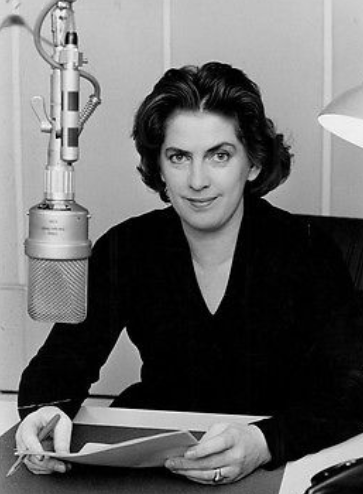
- Maud Reuterswärd in 1953
- Born: January 19, 1920; Stockholm, Sweden
- Died: August 25, 1980 (aged 60)

Maud Reuterswärd, also Reuterswärd-Näsström, (19 February 1920 – 25 August 1980) was a Swedish author and radio presenter.

Reuterswärd was born in Stockholm as the youngest of four siblings, to mother Elin Reuterswärd (née Lamm) and father Gustaf Fredrik Achates Reuterswärd. Her father was the managing director of Tidningarnas Telegrambyrå, and later the head of the radio broadcaster AB Radiotjänst.

Reuterswärd was trained as a kindergarten teacher before she joined AB Radiotjänst, later named Sveriges Radio, at age 24. There, she became an editor with the culture, literature, and art departments. She hosted the radio program "Almanackan", as well as the program "Endast mamma är vaken" (English: Only Mother is Awake), which was broadcast the night before Christmas Eve each year from 1947 to 1971. In addition to broadcasting, she worked as a radio journalist and producer. She received much attention for a radio program recorded during the birth of her son.

Her writing career began in 1962, when her debut short story collection Solvända was published. She wrote children's and young adult books, many of them focused on portraying girlhood or dysfunctional mother-daughter relationships. She wrote the book Dagar med Knubbe in 1970, and later created a children's television series with the same name based on the book.

In 1980 she was posthumously awarded the Astrid Lindgren Prize for her writing in children's literature.

== Personal life ==
Reuterswärd's first marriage was to artist Armand Rossander, and her second marriage was to Sigvard Näsström, a carpenter. She had four children.

== Works ==
- 1962 – Solvända
- 1965 – Svenska landskapsblommor
- 1966 – Dagligt allehanda
- 1969 – Dahlbergs demonstrerar
- 1970 – Dagar med Knubbe
- 1971 – Du har ju pappa, Elisabet
- 1972 – Han – där!
- 1973 – Ta steget, Elisabet
- 1974 – När man heter Noak
- 1975 – Livet rymmer allt, Elisabet
- 1976 – Lökkupolen
- 1977 – Längtarna
- 1978 – Vänskap
- 1978 – Säg som det är
- 1979 – Ida själv
- 1979 – Flickan och dockskåpet
- 1980 – Jacobs tofflor
- 1980 – Så ensam som Ida

== Awards ==
- Expressens Heffaklump, 1972
- Nils Holgersson Plaque, 1976
- Astrid Lindgren Prize, 1980
