= Ann-Madeleine Gelotte =

Swedish illustrator

Ann-Madeleine Gelotte (20 February 1940 – 24 December 2002) was a Swedish illustrator and writer.

== Biography ==
Gelotte worked as a nurse and started publishing children's books in 1971. She made her breakthrough as a children's writer with Ida Maria från Arfliden in 1977. The book depicts her grandmother's life in Lapland in the late 19th century. The book was followed by Tyra i 10:an Odengatan (1981), which is about her mother's childhood in a working-class family in Stockholm in the 1910s to 1920s. Vi bodde i Helenelund (1983) is about her own childhood in Sollentuna köping in the 1940s and 1950s.

She also published some other autobiographical books for adults, such as the book Till morfar på fars dag (1980), where she writes about her life as a child of divorced parents.

== Works ==
- 1971 – Johanna 5 år
- 1973 – Jag ska minsann inte bli stor igen
- 1973 – Här kommer vinden
- 1973 – Då hände det
- 1976 – Det här är en bok om minstingen
- 1977 – Min älva
- 1977 – Ida Maria från Arfliden
- 1978 – Tänk om jag vore
- 1978 – Anhörig
- 1980 – Till morfar på fars dag
- 1981 – Tyra i 10:an Odengatan
- 1983 – Vi bodde i Helenelund
- 1985 – Där de vita sängar stå
- 1986 – En björnberättelse
- 1988 – Aladdins son
- 1990 – Gunnar Grimms äventyr
- 1992 – När vi var barn
- 1992 – Snäll
- 1994 – Brev från en kanin
- 1996 – En duktig gris
- 1997 – En tvättbjörns vecka
- 2003 – Har du hört om räven?

== Awards ==
- 1977 – Expressens Heffaklump
