= Maj Bylock =

Swedish translator, writer, and teacher (1931–2019)

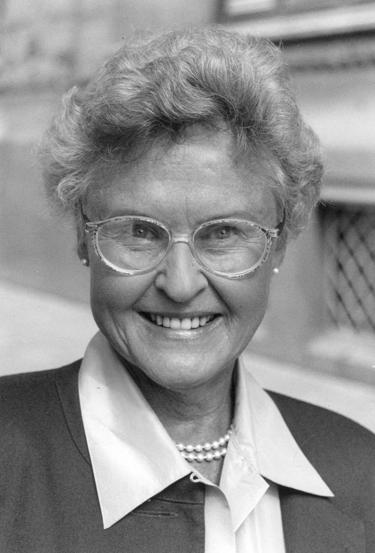
Maj Bylock, 2005

Maj Bylock (21 March 1931 – 18 August 2019) was a Swedish children's writer, translator, and teacher. Her works have been translated into Danish, English, Finnish, Faroese, Dutch, Latvian, Norwegian, Polish, Sami, Turkish, and German. She is the recipient of the Litteris et Artibus medal among other awards.

== Biography ==
Maj Kerstin Andersson was born in Visby, on the Swedish island of Gotland, on 21 March 1931. At the age of 12, the family moved to Värmland where she stayed. She completed her studies to be a primary school teacher, and then worked in that profession until 1961.

The first books she wrote were textbooks in history and religion, when she, as a teacher, found that there were no good books for children in these subjects. Over the years, she also wrote books for children and young people as well as adults. Her authorship has a clear historical mark. In 2010, her contribution to improving children's education was the subject of Mary Ingemansson's thesis The Historical Novel and Historical Consciousness in ten- to twelve-year-olds - Maj Bylocks. She is translated into Danish, English, Finnish, Faroese, Dutch, Latvian, Norwegian, Polish, Sami, Turkish, and German. Bylock also contributed a hymn, No. 524, Är dagen fylld av oro och bekymmer, in the Swedish hymn book, music by Anfinn Øien. Her award-winning Solstenen, became a musical. In later years, in addition to her own writing, Bylock recounted a number of notable classics in world literature. The intention was to make them accessible to a greater number of readers and to contribute to a rich, international cultural heritage being passed on. Bylock was awarded the Astrid Lindgren Prize in 1990. She received an honorary doctor from Karlstad University in 2006.

Bylock died in Karlstad on 18 August 2019. She is buried at Nyed's cemetery.

== Awards and honors ==
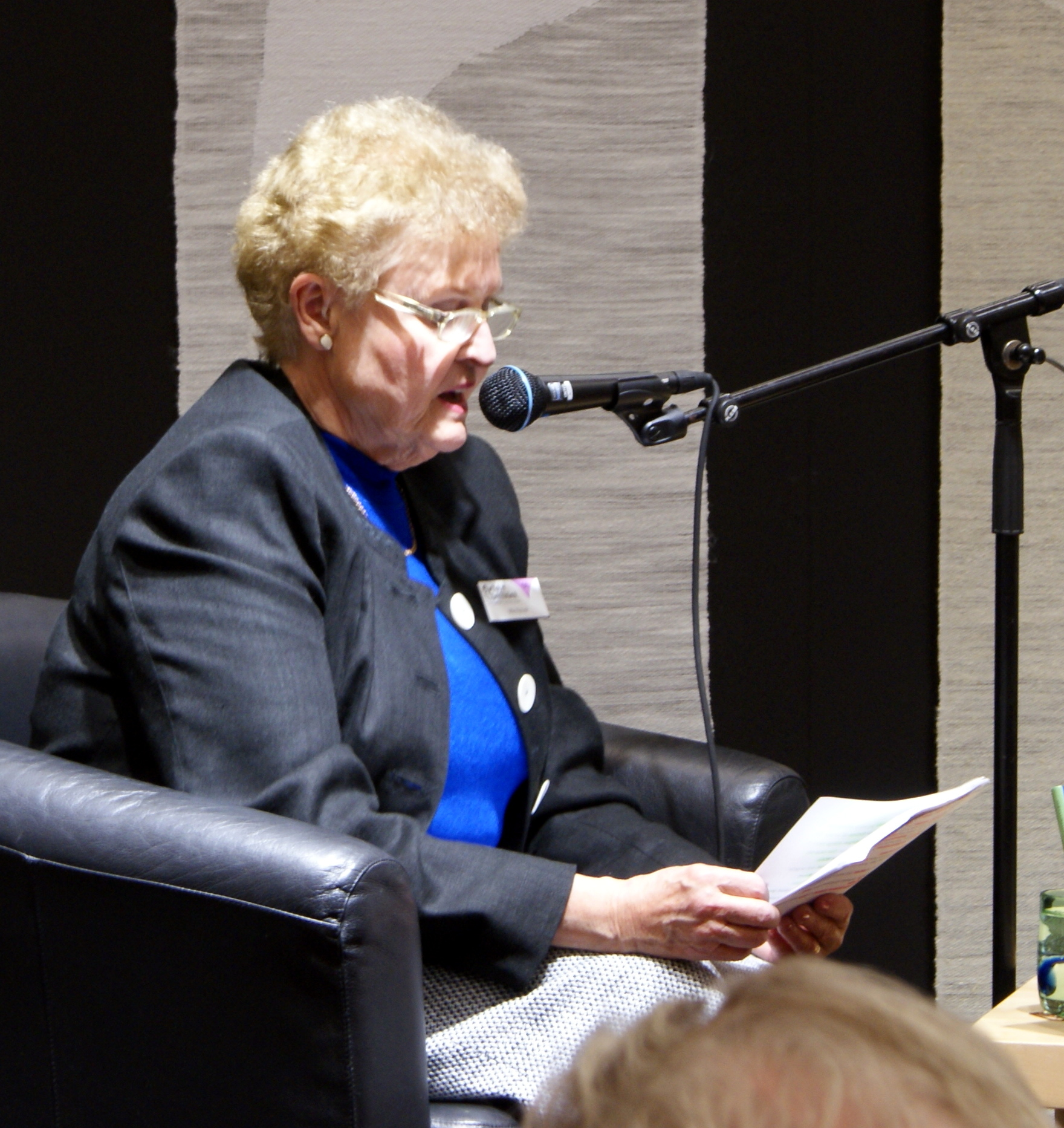
Maj Bylock, 2008

- 1967 - Swedish State Cultural Scholarship
- 1969 - Karlstad City Culture Scholarship to Gustaf Frödings Minne
- 1969 - 1st prize in Bonniers et al. foreign publisher's competition for the best children's book for Äventyret med grodan
- 1972 - 2nd prize in the Vecko-Journalen competition The new short story for the novel Honda
- 1980 - 1st prize in Harrier's novel prize competition for De sjunkna skeppens vik
- 1981 - Swedish Writers Fund Work Scholarship
- 1983 - Swedish Writers Fund Work Scholarship, two-year
- 1983 - 1st prize in Rabén & Sjögren's jubilee prize competition for Solstenen
- 1986 - Swedish Writer's Fund premium
- 1987 - 1st prize in Bonnier's jubilee prize for Karusell och kärleksbrev
- 1988 - 96 - The Swedish Writers' Fund's guaranteed author's allowance
- 1985 - The Swedish Writers' Association's and the Swedish Journalist's Association's scholarship
- 1990 - Astrid Lindgren Prize
- 1999 - County Council of Värmlands Frödings scholarship
- 2002 - Wettergrens barnbokollon
- 2005 - Karlstad Municipality's Merit Medal of Merit
- 2005 - Warm Country Author of the Year
- 2006 - Honorary Doctor at Karlstad University
- 2008 - Värmland Academy Academy Lagerlöv
- 2009 - Litteris et Artibus medal
- 2010 - The Mårbacka Award

== Selected works ==
=== Textbooks ===
- 1961–66 – Morgonsamlingar I–III
- 1963–82 – Grundskolans religionskunskap årskurserna 1–6
- 1966–67 – Tapio Finnpojken, Bland borgare och bönder, Bland klosterfolk och riddare
- 1974–77 – Femettserien Religion, Historia och Naturkunskap
- 1979 – Kina
- 1992 – Tomtar, häxor och Mårten Gås

=== Children's books ===
- 1964 – Saga och lek
- 1969 – Äventyret med grodan
- 1974 – Frida Tomasine får en syster (part 1/3)
  - 1976 – Fridas första sommarlov (part 2/3)
  - 1976 – Fridas första jobb (part 3/3)
- 1981 – Jag har ingen trollstav
- 1982 – Spökskeppet
- 1984 – Blå fjäril
- 1986 – Skor med vingar
- 1987 – Karusell och kärleksbrev (part 1/3)
  - 1988 – Dynamit och hallonbåtar (part 2/3)
  - 1991 – Dödskallar och hjärtesår (part 3/3)
- 1987 – Micke och hemliga Jansson (part 1/3)
  - 1988 – Micke, Jansson och häxan i gröna huset (part 2/3)
  - 1990 – Micke, Gustav och guldklimpen (part 3/3)
- 1992 – Hyacinta
- 1992 – Borgen med trappan som inte fanns
- 1996 – Tusen guldslantar
- 1997 – Drakskeppet (part 1/3)
  - 1998 – Det gyllene svärdet (part 2/3)
  - 1998 – Borgen i fjärran (part 3/3)
- 1997 – Tigern Lisa och monstret (part 1/4)
  - 1997 – Var är monstret? (part 2/4)
  - 1998 – Monster och musöron (part 3/4)
  - 1998 – Monstrets hemlighet (part 4/4)
- 1999 – Skatter ur Bibeln
- 2002 – Miss Jamahas hemlighet
- 1999 – Flykten till järnets land (part 1/7)
  - 2000 – Den svartes hemlighet (part 2/7)
  - 2001 – Spöket på Örneborg (part 3/7)
  - 2002 – Klockan och döden (part 4/7)
  - 2003 – Marie och Mårten i nya världen (part 5/7)
  - 2004 – Blå molnets gåva (part 6/7)
  - 2005 – Celine och drottningen (part 7/7)

=== Youth books ===
- 1973 – Honda
- 1975 – Helena och filosofen
- 1983 – Syster Pelle
- 1983 – Solstenen (part 1/3)
  - 1984 – Månringen (part 2/3)
  - 1985 – Stjärnhavet (part 3/3)
- 1985 – Trollpaavos klockor
- 1988 – Silverpil
- 1989 – Häxprovet (part 1/7)
  - 1990 – Häxans dotter (part 2/7)
  - 1991 – Häxpojken (part 3/7)
  - 1993 – Häxguldet (part 4/7)
  - 1995 – Häxkatten (part 5/7)
  - 1996 – Häxbrygden (part 6/7)
  - 1998 – Häxdoktorn (part 7/7)
- 1989 – Skrinet på vinden
- 1994 – De gyllene öarna
- 2007 – Fågelprinsen (part 1/-)
  - 2008 – Häst med gyllene hovar (part 2/-)
  - 2009 – Dimmornas ö (part 3/-)

=== Adult books ===
- 1980 – De sjunkna skeppens vik
- 1988 – Här en källa rinner
- 1989 – Djävulsögat
- 2001 – Texter ur Bibeln
