= Pija Lindenbaum =

Swedish illustrator, author and designer

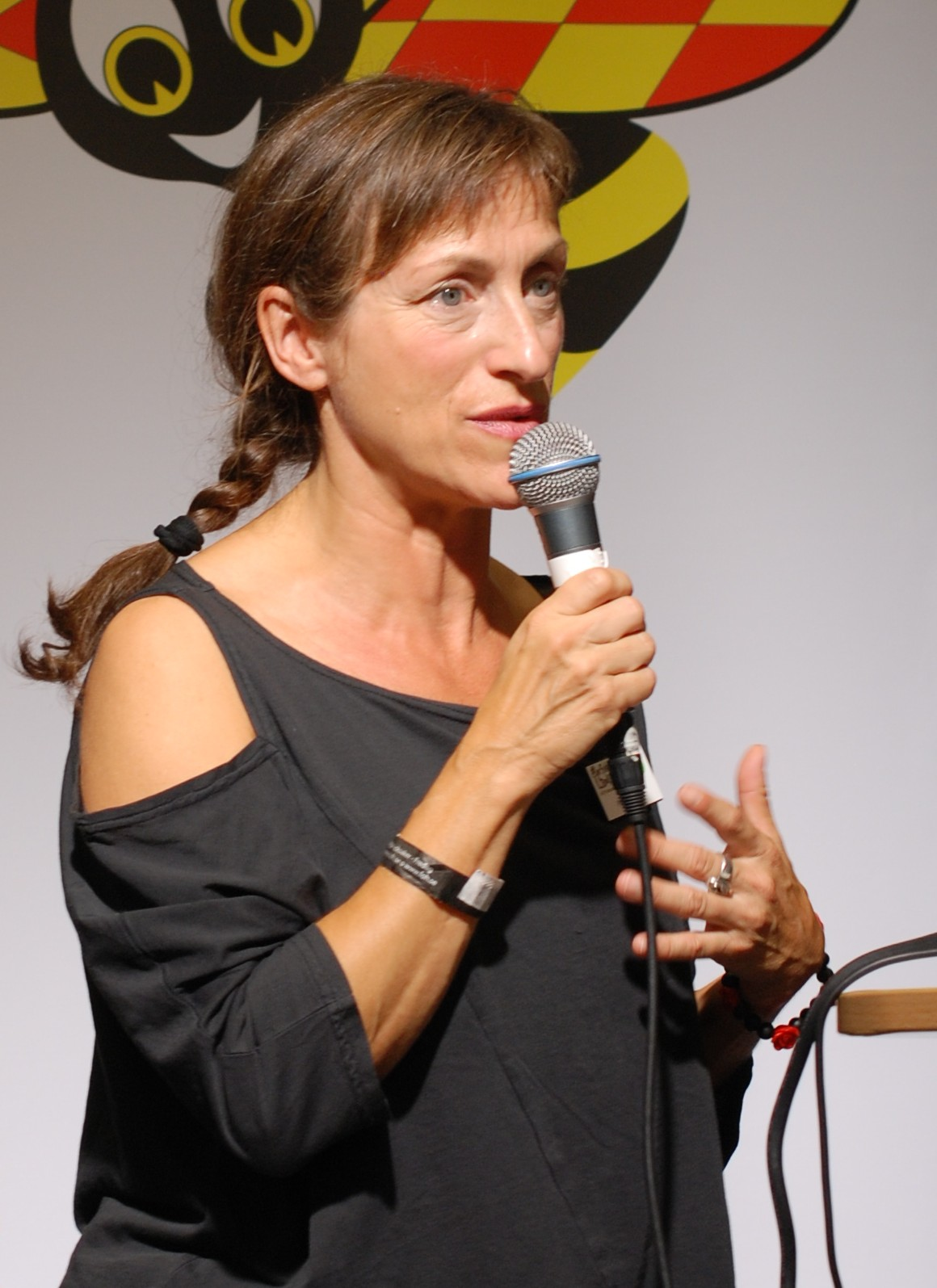
- Pija Lindenbaum at the 2010 Gothenburg Book Fair
- Born: Pia Margareta Lindenbaum; 27 April 1955 (age 71); Sundsvall, Sweden

Pija Lindenbaum (born Pia Margareta Lindenbaum 27 April 1955 in Sundsvall, Sweden) is a Swedish illustrator, author and designer. 1999–2007 she was the 14th chair of the Swedish Academy for Children's Books. She has illustrated the Tsatsiki books written by Moni Nilsson-Brännström.

== Bibliography ==
- 1980 – Krisen i den kommunistiska rörelsen (cover art, written by Fernando Claudin)
- 1986 – Boeing 747 (illustrator, written by Ulf Nilsson)
- 1990 – Else-Marie and her seven little daddies (adapted by Gabrielle Charbonnet) (Else-Marie och småpapporna)
- 1991 – Boodil my dog (retold by Gabrielle Charbonnet) (Boken om Bodil)
- 1992 – Louie (Bra Börje) (together with Barbro Lindgren)
- 1994 – Min!
- 1994 – Ä dä?
- 1995 – Nam-Nam
- 1995 – Ha den
- 1996 – Britten och prins Benny
- 1997 – Starke Arvid
- 1998 – Glossas café
- 2000 – Bridget and the gray wolves Gittan och gråvargarna
- 2001 – Bridget and the muttonheads (Gittan och fårskallarna)
- 2002 – Mirabelle (Mirabell) (illustrator, written by Astrid Lindgren)
- 2003 – Bridget and the moose brothers (Gittan och älgbrorsorna)
- 2004 – Säger hunden?
- 2005 – When Owen's mom breathed fire (När Åkes mamma glömde bort)
- 2006 – Mini Mia and her darling uncle (Lill-Zlatan och morbror raring)
- 2007 – Kenta och barbisarna
- 2009 – Siv sover vilse

== Awards ==
- 1990 & 2006 – BMF Plaque (for the books Else-Marie och småpapporna and Lill-Zlatan och morbror raring)
- 1990 – Expressens Heffaklump (for the book Else-Marie och småpapporna)
- 1993 – Elsa Beskow Plaque (for the book Bra Börje)
- 2000 – August Prize (for the book Gittan och gråvargarna)
- 2000 – Bokjuryn
- 2000 – Rabén & Sjögrens tecknarstipendium
- 2005 – Wettergrens barnbokollon
- 2005 – Bokhandelns val
- 2005 – Stockholms stads hederspris
- 2008 – Astrid Lindgren Award
- 2012 – Deutscher Jugendliteraturpreis (for the book Siv sover vilse)
