= Elisabeth Östnäs =

Swedish writer

Elisabeth Östnäs (born 1974 in Lund), is a Swedish writer. She made her debut in 2012 with the horror novel Feberflickan, which takes place in Lund in the 1890s. Her historical youth fantasy trilogy Sagan om Turid, earned her the Slangbellan Award for best new Swedish writer of children's and youth literature. Sagan om Turid has also been adapted as a radio drama for Swedish public radio.

Östnäs holds degrees in the history of religion and creative writing, and has studied writing at Skrivarakademin in Stockholm and Lunds författarskola.
