= Gunilla Lundgren =

Swedish writer (born 1942)

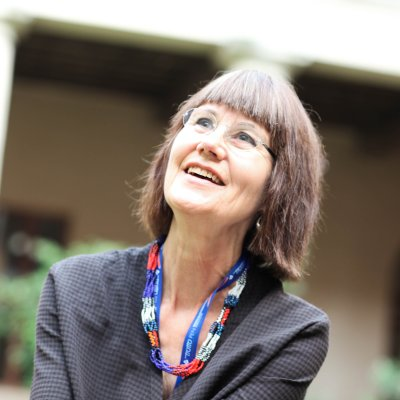
- Born: 1942 (age 83–84); Bergslagen, Sweden
- Occupations: Writer, author

Gunilla Lundgren is a Swedish writer and a peace and environmental activist. She is the coordinator of the International Swedish Writers' Union. Author of more than 30 books for children (for which she received prestigious awards), translated into many languages and many books in bilingual editions for the second-generation children of immigrants. Among them: In this wide world, an anthology of poems, songs, games in 64 languages, including Fula, Haya, Kimbundu, Creole, Somali, Swahili, Tigrinya, Wolof and Xhosa. She is currently working out a program that involves children in a neighbourhood of immigrants in the suburb of Stockholm, Rinkeby, and the children of a South African township, Langa, near Cape Town.

In 1972, she wrote her first book, Maritza a Gypsy Girl (Maritza en zigenarflicka) together with three teenage Roma girls. Many of her books were written in cooperation with Roma, among them the cartoon book Sofia Z 4515, which is about Sofia Taikon who survived the concentration camp Auschwitz.

== Bibliography ==
- Maritza a Gypsy Girl, (Maritza en zigenarflicka), 1972.
- Aljosha, 1998.
- Nelson Mandela: the shepherd boy who became president by Gunilla Lundgren and Kerstin Gidfors, 2000.
- Utan Hus utan grav, (Without house, without grave), Romany songs and poems-a bilingual book in Swedish and Romany, 2002.
- Black Roses- Kale Ruze, (Black Roses), a bilingual book in Swedish and Romany about Roma literature, culture and history, 2003.
- Sofia Z-4515, Bilingual in Swedish and Romany, 2006.
- In this wide world
- Cirkusliv- ett år med Brazil Jack, (Circus Life- a year with Brazil Jack), Photos: Malcolm Jacobson, 2009.
