= Lena Anderson =

Swedish children's book illustrator and author

- Born: 27 May 1939 (age 87); Stockholm, Sweden
- Occupations: children's book illustrator and author

Lena Anderson (born 27 May 1939) is a Swedish children's book illustrator and author.

== Biography ==
Anderson was born in Stockholm, Sweden in 1939.

She first gained international success for her illustrations in the 1985 picture book Linnea in Monet's Garden, which was translated into English in 1987. The book, which she made with Christina Björk, took five years to finish. She has worked on multiple other books with writer Christina Björk, including a series of children's stories with the character Linnea.

Anderson mainly draws nature-based illustrations. Her work draws from traditional Swedish picture book styles, similar to that of Elsa Beskow's work.

== Selected works ==
=== Illustrator ===
- Linnea Planterar ("Linnea's Windowsill Garden") (1978; English trans., 1988), by Christina Björk
- Linnea in Monet's Garden (1985; English trans., 1987)
- Linnea's Almanac (1985; English trans., 1989), by Christina Björk

=== Author and illustrator ===
- Majas alfabet ("Maja's Alphabet") (1984)
- Stina (1988; English trans., 1989)
- Bunny Party (1989)
- Stina's Visit (1989; English trans., 1991)
- ABC, sa lilla t ("ABC, Said Little T") (1994)
- Tea for Ten (1998; English trans., 2000)
- Tick-Tock (1998)

== Awards ==
In 1984, Anderson won the Elsa Beskow-plaketten. She received the Rabén & Sjögren's illustrator scholarship in 1984. In 1988, Anderson won the Astrid Lindgren Prize along with Christina Björk. Also in 1988, Linnea in Monet's Garden received the Deutscher Jugendliteraturpreis (German Children's Literature Award) in the children's book category.

Anderson was awarded the Illis quorum medal by the Government of Sweden on 13 July 2023.
