= Thomas Tidholm =

Swedish writer

- Born: 11 April 1943 (age 81); Örebro, Sweden
- Occupation(s): Children's writer, poet, playwright, photographer, translator, musician
- Years active: 1963–present
- Notable work: Over thirty children's books, collaborations with Anna-Clara Tidholm, Swedish translation of The Hitchhiker's Guide series
- Spouse: Anna-Clara Tidholm
- Website: Thomas Tidholm site

Thomas Tidholm (born in Örebro on 11 April 1943) is a Swedish children's writer, poet, playwright, photographer, translator, and musician. Since his debut as a poet in 1963, he has written poetry, novels, stage plays, and some thirty children's books (often collaborating with his wife, artist and writer Anna-Clara Tidholm). He has directed short films for Sveriges Television, done youth theater for Unga Riks, and was a member of Swedish band Pärson Sound/International Harvester in the late sixties. He's also known for the Swedish translation of the radio series and the first four novels in The Hitchhiker's Guide series.
