= Swedish Academy for Children's Books =

- Svenska barnboksakademin
- Formation: 26 May 1989
- Headquarters: Skärholmen, Sweden
- Members: 18
- Official language: Swedish

The Swedish Academy for Children's Books (Swedish: Svenska barnboksakademin) is a nonprofit society, established on 26 May 1989 at the Skärholmen Library in Stockholm, Sweden. Based on the Swedish Academy, its ambitions is to promote children's and youth literature.

Since 1990, the society awards the Eldsjälen Award.
