= List of Swedish television series =

An A-Z list of television series produced in Sweden and the date of first airing:

== - ==
- 100 höjdare (2004)
- 13 Demon Street (1959)
- 16 år (1960)
- 1628 (1991)
- 2 mot 1 (1998)
- 24 karat (1990)
- 24 Konsument (2003)
- 3 Friends and Jerry (1999)
- 7-9÷ (1992)
- Den 5:e kvinnan (2002) (mini)
- Äkta Människor (2012)
- Ett Äktenskap i kris (1992) (mini)
- Älskade Lotten (1996)
- En ängels tålamod (2001)
- Åshöjdens BK (1985) (mini)
- Änglarna sover (1997) (mini)
- Äntligen hemma (1997)
- Äntligen Hi-Tech (2006)
- Ärliga blå ögon (1977) (mini)
- En ö i havet (2003)
- Öbergs på Lillöga (1983)
- Ögonblickets barn (1991)
- Öppna dagar (2003)

== A ==
- Adam (1993)
- Affären Ramel (1985)
- Agnes (2001)
- Albert & Herbert (1974)
- Alberts och Herberts jul (1982)
- Alla vi barn i Bullerbyn (1987)
- Allis med is (1993) (mini)
- Allra mest tecknat (2002)
- Allsång på Skansen (1979)
- Allt ljus på mig! (1987)
- Amforans gåta (1989)
- Anderssons älskarinna (2001) (mini)
- Andra Avenyn (2007-)
- Anmäld försvunnen (1995)
- Anna Holt - polis (1996)
- Anna och gänget (1978) (mini)
- Antikrundan (1989)
- Arns rike (2004) (mini)
- Aspiranterna (1998)
- August Palms äventyr (1985) (mini)
- August Strindberg: Ett liv (1985)
- Avatopia (2003)

== B ==
- Babels hus (1981)
- Bamse - världens starkaste björn! (1972)
- Bara med Britt (1992)
- Bara med Bruno (1997)
- Baren (2000)
- Barnen i höjden (1972) (mini)
- Barnen på Luna (2000)
- Beck (1997)
- Belinder auktioner (2003)
- Bella bland kryddor och kriminella (2002)
- Beppes godnattstund (1970)
- Berglunds begravningar (2003)
- Bert (1994)
- Big Brother Sweden (2000-2004)
- Big Brother Norge vs. Sverige (2005-2006)
- Bingolotto (1989)
- Björnes magasin (1987)
- Blueprint (1992) (mini)
- Blå gatan (1966) (mini)
- Bombi Bitt och jag (1968)
- Bondånger (1997) (mini)
- Boston Tea Party (2007)
- Bota mig! (2006) (mini)
- Brandvägg (2006) (mini)
- Britt Yngves (1999) (mini)
- Broster, Broster! (1971) (mini)
- Brottsvåg (2000)
- Browalls (1999)
- Bröderna Fluff (1996)
- Bröderna Lejonhjärta (1985)
- Bröderna Malm (1972)
- Bröderna Olsson (1987)
- Bröderna (1974) (mini)
- Bullen (1987)
- Byhåla (1991)
- Byhåla 2 - Tillbaka till Fårrden (1992)
- Byhåla 3 (1993)

== C ==
- c/o Segemyhr (1998)
- Carl-Jans änglar (2006)
- Casino Comedy Club (1990)
- Celeb Poker (2005)
- Cleo (2002)
- Club Goa (2005)
- Cluedo - en mordgåta (1996)
- Coachen (2005)
- Cosmomind (2003)
- Creepschool (2003)

== D ==
- Dagar med Knubbe (1976)
- Daghemmet Lyckan (1987) (mini)
- Danslärarens återkomst (2004) (mini)
- Decemberdröm, En (2005)
- Destination Nordsjön (1990)
- Det blir jul på Möllegården (1980)
- Det blåser på månen (1985) (mini)
- Det brinner! (2002) (mini)
- Det finns inga smålänningar (1981) (mini)
- Det spökar (1999)
- Det var då... (1989) (mini)
- Detta har hänt (1996)
- Dieselråttor och sjömansmöss (2002)
- Din stund på jorden (1973) (mini)
- Dips (2018)
- Djursjukhuset (1997)
- Dokument:Humor (2005)
- Dolly & Dolly (1998) (mini)
- Dom kallar oss Tratten & Finkel (1996)
- Doobidoo (2005)
- Dr. Mugg (2002)
- De Drabbade (2003)
- Drottningens juvelsmycke (1967) (mini)
- Drømmekvinden (2004)
- Du bestämmer (1994)
- Dubbelstötarna (1980) (mini)
- Dubbelsvindlarna (1982) (mini)
- Dåres försvarstal, En (1976) (mini)
- Dårfinkar & dönickar (1989)
- Döda danskar räknas inte (1994) (mini)

== E ==
- Ebba och Didrik (1990)
- Efterlyst (1991)
- Elake polisen, Den (1989) (mini)
- Emblas hemlighet (2006)
- Emil i Lönneberga (1974)
- Emma åklagare (1997)
- Engeln II (1976) (mini)
- Engeln (1974) (mini)
- Errol (2003) (mini)
- Esters testamente (1994) (mini)
- Estonia - Livlinan som brast (2002) (mini)
- Estrad (1967)
- Eva & Adam (1999)

== F ==
- Fallet Paragon (1994) (mini)
- Fame Factory (2002) (mini)
- Familjen Ekbladh (1971) (mini)
- Familjen Schedblad (1988)
- Familjen (2002)
- Farbror Frippes skafferi (1976)
- Farbror Pekkas handelsbod (1965)
- Farbrorn som inte vill va' stor (1979)
- Farlig kurs (1965) (mini)
- Farmen (2001/II)
- Farmor och vår herre (1983) (mini)
- Fem dagar i December (1981)
- Fem gånger Storm (2000)
- Fem myror är fler än fyra elefanter (1973) (mini)
- Fiendens fiende (1990) (mini)
- Firklang (1965)
- Fiskeläget (1974) (mini)
- Flickan vid stenbänken (1989)
- Fling (2004)
- Flykten (1986) (mini)
- Fot i graven, En (2001) (mini)
- Fredrikssons fabrikk (1990)
- Frida och hennes vän (1970) (mini)
- Frihetens skugga (1994) (mini)
- Friställd (1969) (mini)
- Fråga om liv och död, En (2006) (mini)
- Från A till Ö (1974)
- Från Bosnien (1996) (mini)
- Från och med herr Gunnar Papphammar (1980)
- Full frys (1999)
- Full fräs med Stefan & Krister (1993)
- Fyra för tre, En (1996)
- Fådda blommor (1988) (mini)
- Fångarna på fortet (1991)
- FörKväll (2006)
- Förmannen som försvann (1997)
- Förnimmelse av mord (2002)
- Första kärleken (1992) (mini)
- Förste zigenaren i rymden, Den (2002) (mini)

== G ==
- Gay Army (2006)
- Geheimnis des Steins, Das (1992)
- GladPack (2000) (mini)
- Glappet (1997) (mini)
- Glaskupan (2025)
- Glöm inte mamma! (1998)
- God morgon alla barn (2005) (mini)
- Goda grannar (1987)
- Goda viljan, Den (1991) (mini)
- Godafton Sverige (2003)
- Godnatt, jord (1979)
- Godnatt, Sverige (2005)
- Gold Rush, The (2000) (mini)
- Gott parti, Ett (2007)
- Grattis Världen! (2005)
- Graven (2004) (mini)
- Greta och Albert (1958)
- Gråtande ministern, Den (1993) (mini)
- Gubben Pettson (1993) (mini)
- Guld (1988) (mini)
- Guldburen (1991) (mini)
- Gumman som blev liten som en tesked (1967) (mini)
- Gyldne pil, Den (1973)
- Gynekologen i Askim (2007) (mini)
- Gäst hos Hagge (1975)
- Gösta Berlings saga (1986) (mini)

== H ==
- Halsduken (1962) (mini)
- Hammarkullen (1997) (mini)
- Handbok för handlösa (1994)
- Hedebyborna (1978) (mini)
- Heja Björn (2002)
- Helt apropå (1985)
- Hem till byn (1971)
- Hem till midgård (2003)
- Hemliga verkligheten, Den (1972)
- Hemligas Ö, De (1973)
- Hemma hos Olssons (1997)
- Hemma hoz (1985) (mini)
- Herkules Jonssons storverk (1969) (mini)
- Hermans historia (1991)
- Herr von Hancken (2000) (mini)
- Herrans liv, Ett (2006)
- Hey Baberiba (2005)
- High Chaparall (2003)
- Himla många program, En (1989) (mini)
- Himmel och pannkaka (1977)
- Hipp hipp - Itzhaks julevangelium (2006) (mini)
- HippHipp! (2001)
- Historier kring slott och herresäten (2000) (mini)
- Historiske arbejdspladser (2003)
- Hjälp! Rånare! (2002) (mini)
- Hjälp! (2007)
- Hjärnkontoret (1995)
- Hjärtats saga (1998)
- Hombres (2006)
- Hon och Hannes (2005)
- Hos Jidhe (2006)
- Hotel Seger (2000)
- Humorlabbet (2001)
- Hundra svenska år (1999)
- Hur ska det gå för Pettersson? (1984) (mini)
- Huset Silfvercronas gåta (1974)
- Hylands hörna (1962)
- Håkan Bråkan (2003)
- Håll huvet kallt (1994)
- Håll polisen utanför (1969) (mini)
- Häktet (2005) (mini)
- Höjdarna (2004)
- Höök (2007)

== I ==
- I afton Lantz (2001)
- I havsbandet (1971) (mini)
- I manegen med Glenn Killing (1992) (mini)
- I mumindalen (1973) (mini)
- I regnbågslandet (1970) (mini)
- Ika i rutan (1988)
- Ikas TV-kalas (1990)
- Ingesson (1995)
- Insider (1999) (mini)
- Irma och Gerd (1997)
- Italienska halmhatten, Den (1974) (mini)

== J ==
- Jakten på en mördare (1999) (mini)
- Jakten på ökenguldet (1999)
- Jane Horney (1985) (mini)
- Jeopardy! (1991)
- Jobbet och jag (1998)
- Jonson & Pipen (2006)
- Jonssons onsdag (1983) (mini)
- Jordskott (2015)
- Jul i Kapernaum (1995)
- Julbåten Juliana (1961)
- Julens hjältar (1999)
- Julius Julskötare (1978) (mini)
- Julstrul med Staffan och Bengt (1984)
- Jävla Kajsa (1999)

== K ==
- Kafé Luleå (1994)
- Kajsas ko (1999)
- Kakan (1991)
- Kalender für alle (1996)
- Kalles klätterträd (1975)
- Kallocain (1981) (mini)
- Kaspar i Nudådalen (2001)
- Katitzi (1979)
- Kenny Starfighter (1997)
- Klart spår till Tomteboda (1968) (mini)
- Klass för sig, En (2000)
- Klasses julkalender (1992)
- Klasskrig (1998) (mini)
- Kniven i hjärtat (2004) (mini)
- Koiramäki (2004) (mini)
- Komikers uppväxt, En (1992) (mini)
- Kommissarie Winter (2001)
- Kommissionen (2005) (mini)
- Kobra (2001)
- Kontrapunkt (1971)
- Korsikanske biskopen, Den (1993) (mini)
- Kronprinsessan (2006) (mini)
- Kråkguldet (1969)
- Kråsnålen (1988)
- Krøniken (2004)
- Kulla-Gulla (1986) (mini)
- Kullagret (1986)
- Kullamannen (1967)
- Kungamordet (2008) (mini)
- Kurt Olssons julkalender (1990)
- Kurt Olssons television (1987)
- Kusiner i kubik (1992)
- Kvalster (2005) (mini)
- Kvarteret Skatan (2003)
- Kvartetten som sprängdes (1973) (mini)
- Kvinnan i det låsta rummet (1998) (mini)
- Kvinnor emellan (2004)
- Kvällspressen (1992)
- Kära farmor (1990) (mini)
- Köpmanshus i skärgården, Ett (1972) (mini)

== L ==
- Labyrint (2007)
- Labyrinten (2000) (mini)
- Lagt kort ligger (1987)
- Lasermannen (2005) (mini)
- LasseMajas detektivbyrå (2006)
- Leende guldbruna ögon (2007) (mini)
- Lena Maria Show (1980)
- Levande föda (2007) (mini)
- Lill-Stina på reportage i Storskogen (1964)
- Lilla Aktuellt (1992)
- Lille Luj och Änglaljus i strumpornas hus (1983)
- Linné och hans apostlar (2004)
- Lisa (1998)
- Lita på det oväntade (1988) (mini)
- Lite som du (2005)
- Liten film, En (1999) (mini)
- Litet rött paket, Ett (1999)
- Liv i luckan med julkalendern (1988)
- Livet enligt Rosa (2005)
- Livräddarna (2005)
- Livshunger (2002)
- Lokalreportern (2004) (mini)
- Lorry (1989)
- Lotta på Bråkmakargatan (1992)
- Lotta (1995)
- Lukas 8:18 (1999)
- Lycka till (1980)
- Lyckligt lottade, De (1976)
- Långtradarchaufförens berättelse (1975) (mini)
- Låt stå! (2000)
- Längtans blåa blomma (1998) (mini)
- Lära för livet (1975) (mini)
- Lösa förbindelser (1985)

== M ==
- Macken (1986)
- Macklean (1993) (mini)
- Madicken (1979)
- Magnus och Brasse Show (1980)
- Mahabharata, The (1989) (mini)
- Maj Fant (1993)
- Majken (1995) (mini)
- Makt på spel (1973)
- Malmvägen (2006)
- Marerittet (1990) (mini)
- Marias barn (1987)
- Medicinmannen (2005) (mini)
- Melodifestivalen (1959)
- Millionæren (2004)
- Mimmi (1988)
- Min f.d. familj (2004)
- Min vän Percys magiska gymnastikskor (1994)
- Min vän shejken i Stureby (1997) (mini)
- Mirakelpojken (2001)
- Mitt i livet (1999)
- Mitt sanna jag (1995)
- Mor gifter sig (1979) (mini)
- Mord och passion (1991)
- Morsarvet (1993) (mini)
- Mullvaden (2000)
- Mumintrollet (1969)
- Musikbyrån (1996)
- Mysteriet på Greveholm (1996)
- Måndagsklubben (1996)
- Mäklarna (2006)
- Män emellan (2003) (mini)
- Mäster Olof (1983) (mini)
- Mästerverket (2006) (mini)
- Möbelhandlarens dotter (2006) (mini)
- Mördare utan ansikte (1994) (mini)

== N ==
- N.P. Möller, fastighetsskötare (1972)
- Nattsudd (1985)
- Niklas önskedjur (1972)
- NileCity 105,6 (1995) (mini)
- Nils-Petter Sundgrens Från Pussar till Porr (1994)
- Nina, Nora, Nalle (1961) (mini)
- Nisse Hults historiska snedsteg (2006)
- Nr. 13 (1998)
- Nu är det nu (2000)
- Nu seglar Pip-Larssons (1971)
- Nudlar och 08:or (1996)
- Nya tider (1999)
- Nybyggarland (1972)
- Nyhetsmorgon (1992)
- Någonstans i Sverige (1973) (mini)
- Nämndemans död, En (1995) (mini)
- När karusellerna sover (1998)
- Närbild (2004)
- Nästa man till rakning (1993) (mini)
- Nöjesmaskinen (1982)
- Nöjesmassakern (1985)
- Nöjesredaktionen - i allmänhetens tjänst (1998)

== O ==
- Ocean Ave. (2002)
- Offer och gärningsmän (1999) (mini)
- Offside (1971) (mini)
- Okända, Det (2004)
- Oldsbergs Europa (1998)
- Olivia Twist (2002) (mini)
- Om du var jag (2005) (mini)
- Om Stig Petrés hemlighet (2004) (mini)
- Onkel Thores Stuga (1967)
- OP7 (1997)
- Operation Argus (1966) (mini)
- Operation Stella Polaris (2003) (mini)
- Oppermanns (1983) (mini)
- Orient-Express (1979) (mini)
- Orka! Orka! (2004)
- Osynlig närvaro (1991) (mini)

== P ==
- Pank (1981)
- Pappa polis (2002) (mini)
- Pappa vet bäst (1978)
- Pappas flicka (1997)
- Pappas pojkar (1973)
- Papphammar (1999)
- Paradise Hotel (2005/I)
- Paragraf 9 (2003)
- Parlamentet (1999)
- Pelle Jansson (1973) (mini)
- Pelle Svanslös (1997)
- Pentagon (1997)
- Percy Tårar (1996)
- Persons parfymeri (1997)
- Peta näsan (1987)
- Petter kommer igen (1963) (mini)
- Pip-Larssons (1998)
- Pippi Långstrump (1969)
- Pistvakt – En vintersaga (1998)
- Plastic Fantastic (2003)
- Playa del Sol (2007)
- Pojken med guldbyxorna (1975) (mini)
- Pojken som lånade ut sin röst (1979) (mini)
- Polisen och domarmordet (1993) (mini)
- Polisen och pyromanen (1996) (mini)
- Polisen som vägrade ge upp (1984) (mini)
- Polisen som vägrade svara (1982) (mini)
- Poliser (2006)
- Popside (1966)
- Popverkstan (2005) (mini)
- Portis klarar skivan (1991)
- Prat i kvadrat (1985)
- Profitörerna (1983) (mini)
- Prästkappan (1986) (mini)
- PTV - Penetrerings-TV (1991)
- Pusselbitar (2001) (mini)
- På gränsen (2000)
- På kurs med Kurt (1981) (mini)
- På spåret (1987)

== R ==
- Radioskugga (1995)
- Raggadish (2004)
- Rallarsving (2005)
- Ramona (2003) (mini)
- Rapport till himlen (1994) (mini)
- Raskens (1976) (mini)
- Rasmus på luffen (1981)
- Real World Stockholm, The (1995)
- Real World Visby, The (1996)
- Rederiet (1992)
- Rejseholdet (2000)
- Rena rama Rolf (1994)
- Rena rama sanningen (1993)
- Resande teatersällskap, Ett (1977) (mini)
- Reuter & Skoog (1999)
- Rid i natt! (1985) (mini)
- Riget II (1997) (mini)
- Riget (1994) (mini)
- Riksorganet (1998)
- Riktig Jul, En (2007)
- Ringlek (1982) (mini)
- Risto Räppääjä (2000) (mini)
- Robin (1993)
- Robins (2006)
- Robinson VIP (2005)
- Rocky + Drago (2006)
- Roligt elakt aktuellt (2001)
- Ronny & Julia (2000)
- Rosenbaddarna (1990)
- Rosenbaum (1991) (mini)
- Rosenholm (1991)
- Rulle på Rulseröd (1974) (mini)
- Rummel & Rabalder (1997)
- Röd snö (1985) (mini)
- Röda rummet (1970) (mini)

== S ==
- S*M*A*S*H (1990) (mini)
- S:t Mikael (1998)
- Sally (1999)
- Saltön 2 (2007) (mini)
- Saltön (2005)
- Sam and the River (1975)
- Sammansvärjningen (1986) (mini)
- Sanningen om Marika (2007)
- Sant och sånt (1972)
- Schaurige Geschichten (1975)
- Selambs (1979) (mini)
- Semlons gröna dalar (1977) (mini)
- Sen kväll med Luuk (1996)
- Septet (1966)
- Sexton (1996) (mini)
- Silvermannen (1996) (mini)
- Sinkadus (1980) (mini)
- Sjukan (1995)
- Sjätte dagen (1999)
- Skatten på Bråtehus (1984) (mini)
- Skeppsholmen (2002)
- Skeppsredaren (1979)
- Skilda världar (1996)
- Skrivklådan (1986)
- Skrotnisse och hans vänner (1985) (mini)
- Skuggornas hus (1996) (mini)
- Skulden (1982) (mini)
- Skyll inte på mig (1978)
- Skärgårdsdoktorn (1997)
- Skärgårdsflirt (1972) (mini)
- Skärp dig, älskling (1981) (mini)
- Slättemölla by (1968) (mini)
- Småpratarna (1996)
- Småstad vid seklets början, En (1966)
- Snacka om nyheter (1995)
- Snapphanar (2006) (mini)
- Snoken (1993)
- Snutarna - SWIP (1994)
- Societetshuset (1963) (mini)
- Solbacken:Avd. E (2003) (mini)
- Soldater i månsken (2000) (mini)
- Solisterna (2003) (mini)
- Solo (1994)
- Solstollarna (1985)
- Som löven i Vallombrosa (1995) (mini)
- Sommarflickan (1976)
- Sommarkrysset (2005)
- Spacer (2002)
- Spung (2002)
- Stackars Tom (2002) (mini)
- Stereo se/dk (2003)
- Stereo (1996)
- Stjärnhuset (1981)
- Stjärnorna på slottet (2006) (mini)
- Stjärnsmällar och julpussar (1986)
- Stockholm Live (2004)
- Stockholmare (2001)
- Stora skälvan (1972)
- Stora teatern (2002) (mini)
- Storstad (1990)
- Straffet (1974) (mini)
- Studierektorns sista strid (1986) (mini)
- Studio S (1976)
- Studio Virtanen 2006 (2006)
- Styv kuling (1980) (mini)
- Sug (2003)
- Sunes jul (1991)
- Supersnällasilversara och Stålhenrik (2005) (mini)
- Svara på skoj (1992)
- Svarta cirkeln, Den (1990)
- Svarta skallar och vita nätter (1995) (mini)
- Svenska hjärtan (1987)
- Svenska mord (2000)
- Svenska slut (2002)
- Svensson Svensson (1994)
- Sverige - Tusen år (1999)
- Sverige dansar och ler (2007)
- Så går det till på Saltkråkan (1977)
- Så ska det låta (1997)
- Söderkåkar (1970) (mini)
- Söderlund/Bie (2006)

== T ==
- Tab & vind! (2005)
- Talang (2007)
- Talismanen (2003) (mini)
- Taxibilder (1984) (mini)
- Tekniskt magasin (1957)
- Temptation Island (2002/II)
- Teskedsgumman (1973)
- Time Out (1982) (mini)
- Tivoli (2004)
- Tjejerna gör uppror (1977) (mini)
- Tjocka släkten (1975) (mini)
- Toffelhjältarna (1984)
- Tolvslaget på Skansen (1977)
- Tomtefamiljen i Storskogen (1962)
- Tomtemaskinen (1993)
- Top Model 2006: Milano (2006)
- Tornado - en tittarstorm (1993) (mini)
- Torntuppen (1996) (mini)
- Torpet (1962) (mini)
- Totte (1973) (mini)
- Trälen (2006)
- Trappen (1991) (mini)
- Trazan & Banarne (1976)
- Tre från Haparanda, De (1974) (mini)
- Tre kast (1975)
- Tre kronor (1994)
- Tre kärlekar (1989)
- Tre terminer (1995) (mini)
- Trekampen (1964)
- Trollkarlens pojke (1982) (mini)
- Trolltider (1979)
- Träpatronerna (1984) (mini)
- Träpatronerna (1988) (mini)
- Tunna blå linjen (2021–)
- Tur i kärlek (1989)
- Ture Sventon privatdetektiv (1989)
- Tusenbröder (2002)
- TV für alle (1995)
- Två som oss (1999)
- Tänkande brevbäraren, Den (1963)
- Täta elden, Den (1995) (mini)

== U ==
- Ulveson och Herngren (2005)
- Underbar uppfinning, En (1996) (mini)
- Ungkaren (2003)
- Upp till kamp (2007) (mini)
- Uppfinnaren (1991)
- Uppåt väggarna (1981)
- Urcellen Ellen (1978)
- Ursäkta röran, vi bygger om (2002)
- Utmanarna (1998)

== V ==
- V som i Viking (1991) (mini)
- Valvet (2000)
- Varuhuset (1987)
- Veddemålet (2004) (mini)
- Vem tar vem? (1991)
- Vem vill bli miljonär (1999)
- Vendetta (1995) (mini)
- Vera med flera (2003)
- Vi i femman (1970)
- Vi på Saltkråkan (1964)
- Villervalle i Söderhavet (1963)
- Vilse i pannkakan (1975)
- Vinnarskallar (2006)
- Vita lögner (1997)
- Vita stenen, Den (1973) (mini)
- Vägen till Gyllenblå! (1985) (mini)
- Vägg i vägg (1986)
- Vänner och fiender (1996)
- Världarnas bok (2006)
- Värmland Classic Festival (1991)

== W ==
- Wallander (2005)
- Welcome to Sweden (2007)
- Wild Kids (2005)
- World of Tosh, The (2002)

== X ==
- Xerxes (1988) (mini)

== Y ==
- Yasemin på flykt (1992) (mini)
- Young Royals (2021)

== Z ==
- Zonen (1996) (mini)
- Zvampen (1983)
- Zweite Heimat - Chronik einer Jugend, Die (1992)
