= Mimmi =

Mimmi is both a surname and a feminine given name. Notable people with the name include:

Surname:

- Franco Mimmi (born 1942), Italian journalist and writer
- Marcello Mimmi (1882–1961), Italian Roman Catholic archbishop and cardinal

Given name:

- Mimmi Bæivi (born 1950), Norwegian politician
- Mimmi Bähr (1844–1923), Finnish calligraphy inventor
- Mimmi Haapasalo (1881–1970), Finnish salesperson and politician
- Mimmi Kanervo (1870–1922), Finnish politician and trade unionist
- Mimmi Kotka (born 1981), Swedish runner
- Mimmi Larsson (born 1994), Swedish footballer
- Mimmi Löfwenius (born 1994), Swedish footballer
- Mimmi Paulsson-Febo (born 1994), Swedish footballer
- Mimmi Sandén (born 1995), Swedish singer
- Mimmi Spång (born 1973), Swedish film producer and production manager
- Mimmi Wahlström (born 1994), Swedish footballer
- Mimmi Wikstedt (1954–2019), Swedish tennis player

== See also ==
- Mimmi, Viveca Lärn book series
- Mimmi, TV series based on the Viveca Lärn books
- Mimie, Cameroonian singer and actress
