= Eddie hittar guld =

2001 book by Viveca Lärn

- Author: Viveca Lärn
- Illustrator: Eva Eriksson
- Language: Swedish
- Series: Eddie
- Genre: Children's literature
- Published: 2001
- Publisher: Rabén & Sjögren
- Publication place: Sweden
- Preceded by: Håll huvet kallt, Eddie!

Eddie hittar guld is a 2001 children's book by Viveca Lärn and the sixth and the final book in the Eddie series.

== Plot ==
Eddie is eight years old and will soon begin the second grade at school, where he gets a new schoolteacher, but he better enjoys the brook near the forest. Meanwhile, his father Lennart has become a non-drinking alcoholic.
