= En ettas dagbok =

1982 children's book by Viveca Sundvall

- Author: Viveca Sundvall
- Illustrator: Eva Eriksson
- Cover artist: Eva Eriksson
- Language: Swedish
- Series: Mimmi
- Genre: Children's literature
- Published: 1982
- Publisher: Rabén & Sjögren
- Publication place: Sweden
- Preceded by: Monstret i skåpet
- Followed by: Roberta Karlsson och kungen

En ettas dagbok is a 1982 children's book by Viveca Sundvall and the second book in the Mimmi series. Written as a diary, it is set between 16 August and 30 April the year Mimmi attends the first grade at school. Together with Roberta Karlsson och kungen and Vi smyger på Enok they were later all released in a collection called Mimmis bok.

In 1985, a TV series based on the book was made.

== Plot ==
Mimmi has begun the first grade at school. Their schoolteacher is called "Gullfröken". Mimmi's two years older friend goes to third grade. The janitor mostly seems to be angry.
