= Eddies hus =

1994 book by Viveca Sundvall

- Author: Viveca Sundvall
- Illustrator: Eva Eriksson
- Language: Swedish
- Series: Eddie
- Genre: Children's literature
- Set in: Lysekil, Sweden
- Published: 1994
- Publisher: Rabén & Sjögren
- Publication place: Sweden
- Preceded by: Eddie och Johanna
- Followed by: Håll huvet kallt, Eddie!

Eddies hus is a 1994 children's book by Viveca Sundvall and the fourth book in the Eddie series.

== Plot ==
The story is set in Lysekil, where Eddie lives with his aunt Soffan and uncle Malkolm. The Christmas break is almost over. Eddie discovers a group of planks down the shoreline, and decides to build a house.
