= Berenett =

Berenett is a surname. Notable people with the surname include:

- Lars-Erik Berenett (1942–2017), Swedish actor
- Matti Berenett (born 1971), Swedish actor, son of Lars-Erik
