= Roberta Karlsson och kungen =

1983 children's book by Viveca Sundvall

- Author: Viveca Lärn
- Illustrator: Eva Eriksson
- Cover artist: Eva Eriksson
- Language: Swedish
- Series: Mimmi
- Genre: Children's literature
- Published: 1983
- Publisher: Rabén & Sjögren
- Publication place: Sweden
- Preceded by: En ettas dagbok
- Followed by: Vi smyger på Enok

Roberta Karlsson och kungen is a 1983 children's book by Viveca Lärn and the third book in the Mimmi series. Written as a diary, it is set between 8 June and 16 July the year Mimmi has summer vacation between first and second grade. Together with En ettas dagbok and Vi smyger på Enok they were later all released in a collection called Mimmis bok.

== Plot ==
During her first summer holiday, Mimmi travels in Norrland. At Albin, her uncle at her mother's side, she meets Lasse. In Gothenburg Roberta Karlsson states that she has met the king of Sweden.
