= 26th Venice International Film Festival =

Italian film festival in 1965

- Location: Venice, Italy
- Founded: 1932
- Awards: Golden Lion: Sandra
- Festival date: 24 August – 6 September 1965
- Website: Website

Venice Film Festival chronology
- 27th 25th

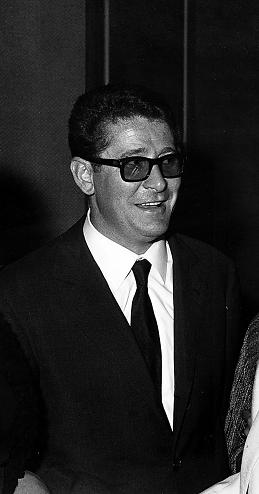
Ermanno Olmi at the 1965 Venice Film Festival i

The 26th annual Venice International Film Festival was held from 24 August to 6 September 1965.

Italian poet Carlo Bo was the Jury President. The Golden Lion winner was Sandra directed by Luchino Visconti.

== Jury ==
- Carlo Bo, Italian poet - Jury President
- Lewis Jacobs, American filmmaker
- Nikolai Lebedev, Soviet actor
- Jay Leyda, American filmmaker
- Max Lippmann, German film historian
- Edgar Morin, French philosopher
- Rune Waldekranz, Swedish producer

== Official Sections ==
The following films were selected to be screened:

=== Main Competition ===
English title	Original title	Director(s)	Production country
Faithfulness	Верность	Pyotr Todorovsky	Soviet Union
I Am Twenty	Мне двадцать лет	Marlen Khutsiev	Soviet Union
Juliet of the Spirits	Giulietta degli spiriti	Federico Fellini	Italy
Kapurush	কাপুরুষ	Satyajit Ray	India
Loves of a Blonde	Lásky jedné plavovlásky	Miloš Forman	Czechoslovakia
Mickey One		Arthur Penn	United States
Modiga mindre män		Leif Krantz	Sweden
Pierrot le Fou		Jean-Luc Godard	France
Red Beard	赤ひげ	Akira Kurosawa	Japan
Sandra	Vaghe stelle dell'Orsa	Luchino Visconti	Italy
Simon of the Desert	Simón del desierto	Luis Buñuel	Mexico
Three Rooms in Manhattan	Trois chambres à Manhattan	Marcel Carné	France

=== Out of Competition ===
English title	Original title	Director(s)	Production country
Black Wind	Viento negro	Servando González	Mexico
Deaf Sam-yong	벙어리 삼룡	Sang-ok Shin	South Korea
The Deceased	A Falecida	Leon Hirszman	Brazil
Film		Alan Schneider	United States
Gertrud		Carl Theodor Dreyer	Denmark
The Knack ...and How to Get It		Richard Lester	United Kingdom
A Man Named John	E venne un uomo	Ermanno Olmi	Italy
Salto		Tadeusz Konwicki	Poland
The Shameless Old Lady	La vieille dame indigne	René Allio	France
Seven Golden Men	7 uomini d'oro	Marco Vicario	Italy
Studies for Louisiana Story		Robert J. Flaherty	United States
Sunday Afternoon	Domingo à Tarde	António de Macedo	Portugal
Twenty Hours	Húsz óra	Zoltán Fábri	Hungary
War and Peace	Война и мир	Sergei Bondarchuk	Soviet Union

== Official Awards ==
=== Main Competition ===
- Golden Lion: Sandra by Luchino Visconti
- Special Jury Prize:
  - I Am Twenty by Marlen Khutsiyev
  - Simon of the Desert by Luis Buñuel
  - Modiga mindre män by Leif Krantz
- Volpi Cup for Best Actor: Toshirô Mifune by Red Beard
- Volpi Cup for Best Actress: Annie Girardot by Three Rooms in Manhattan
- Best First Work: Faithfulness by Pyotr Todorovsky

== Independent Awards ==
=== FIPRESCI Prize ===
- Simon of the Desert by Luis Buñuel
- Gertrud by Carl Theodor Dreyer

=== OCIC Award ===
- Red Beard by Akira Kurosawa

=== UNICRIT Award ===
- Twenty Hours by Zoltán Fábri

=== Lion of San Marco ===
- Utek do vetru by Václav Táborsky
- Tjorven, Båtsman och Moses by Olle Hellbom
- The Snowy Day by Mal Wittman
- Enter Hamlet by School of Visual Art California
- Best Film about Adolescence: The Searching Eye by Saul Bass
- Best Documentary: Le isole incantante by Aleksandr Zguridi
- Best Documentary - Television: Philippe Pétain: Processo a Vichy by Liliana Cavani
- Best Children's Film - Television: Charley by Jimmy Murakami & Alan Ball
- Grand Prize: Jack Frost by Aleksandr Rou
- Silver Medal: Daylight Robbery by Darryl Read

=== San Michele Award ===
- The Whacky Mixed-Up Carabiniers by Felix G. Palmer
