= Mimi and the Biscuit Factory =

1988 children's book by Viveca Sundvall

- Author: Viveca Sundvall
- Original title: Mimmi och kexfabriken
- Illustrator: Eva Eriksson
- Cover artist: Eva Eriksson
- Language: Swedish
- Series: Mimmi
- Genre: Children's literature
- Published: 1988
- Publisher: Rabén & Sjögren
- Publication place: Sweden
- English publication date: 1989
- Preceded by: Mimmis bok
- Followed by: Miljonären Mårtenson

Mimi and the Biscuit Factory (Swedish: Mimmi och kexfabriken) is a 1988 children's book by Viveca Sundvall and the eighth book in the Mimmi series. It was published in English in 1989.

== Plot ==
6-year-old Mimmi lives in a yellow house in a small town in Sweden. Her mother Elin is a waitress working at the restaurant "Gyllene Svanen". Sometimes she works during evenings. When Mimmi and her father stand at their balcony they can smell Henry's biscuit factory.

Anders attends the same Kindergarten as Mimmi, and they are both born the same year. On a Monday in late-May the Kindergarten visits the biscuit factory. That same morning, Mimmi discovers that one of her teeth is loose.

At the biscuit factory the children first watch a film about Henry's father, who developed the recipe for the biscuits. Henry says the recipe is secret but before his death he will whisper it into his daughter Rosamunda's ear. Before leaving the factory the children are all given a biscuit bag and a bun. On the way home Mimmi's tooth gets stuck in the bun, which she puts in her pocket. Once she arrives home, she puts her tooth in a glass of water as she has heard that it will become a krona.

Anders and Mimmi then lock themselves in the kitchen to develop their own biscuit recipe. They hide the recipe behind an old brick wall, intending to recover it in 20 years.

When Mimmi wakes up the upcoming morning, her tooth in the glass has been replaced by a krona and the bun is gone. With the krona, she buys a green pear.
