= Pernilla Stalfelt =

Swedish children's writer

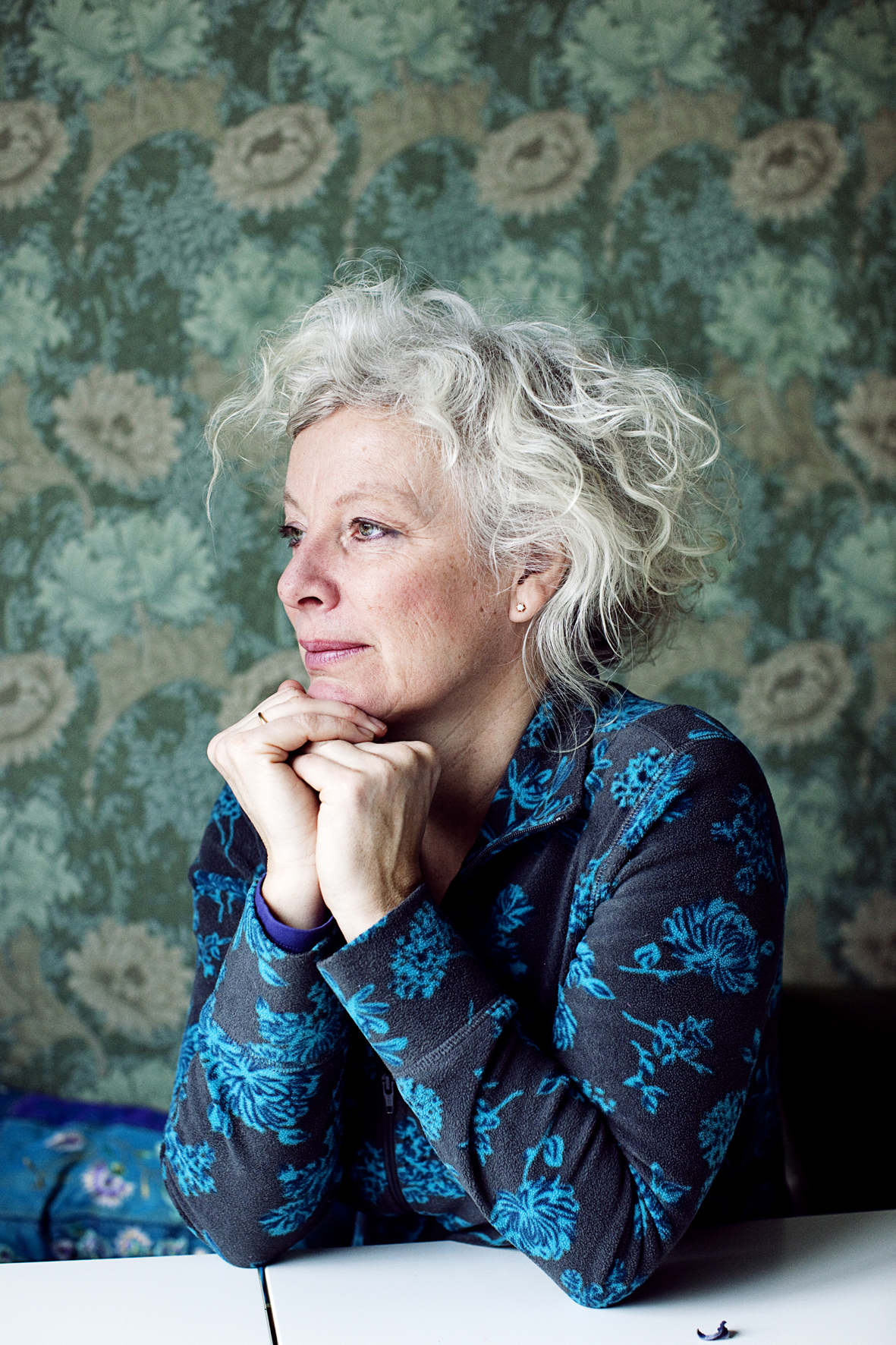
Pernilla Stalfelt

Pernilla Stalfelt (born 1962) is a Swedish children's writer and illustrator. She has gained a reputation for successfully explaining difficult concepts to children in their own language, for example by presenting the Convention on the Rights of the Child in Hurrraa!!! All barns rätt (All Children's Rights). The Death Book, presenting death in children's terms obtained positive reviews when published in English in 2003.

== Biography ==
Stalfelt was born in Helga Trefaldighets församling in Uppsala County on 22 February 1962. Barbro Lindgren's Loranga, Masarin och Dartanjang inspired her to become a children's writer. On completing high school, she studied at Uppsala University in the cultural section.

In 1996, she published the first in a series of works for children with boken (book) in the title. These included Hårboken (The Hair Book, 1996), Bajsboken (The Poop Book, 1997), Dödenboken (The Death Book, 1999) and Kärlekboken (The Love Book, 2001). Stalfeld is also employed by Stockholm's Moderna Museet as a cultural advisor.

== Selected publications ==
- Stalfelt, Pernilla (2002). The Death Book. Groundwood Books. ISBN 978-0-88899-482-0.
- Stalfelt, Pernilla (2002). The Love Book. Groundwood Books. ISBN 978-0-88899-455-4.
