= Mimi Gets a Grandpa =

1990 children's book by Viveca Sundvall

- Author: Viveca Sundvall
- Original title: Mimmi får en farfar
- Illustrator: Eva Eriksson
- Cover artist: Eva Eriksson
- Language: Swedish
- Series: Mimmi
- Genre: Children's literature
- Published: 1990
- Publisher: Rabén & Sjögren
- Publication place: Sweden
- Preceded by: Miljonären Mårtenson
- Followed by: Mera Mimmi

Mimi Gets a Grandpa (Swedish: Mimmi får en farfar) is a 1990 children's book by Viveca Sundvall and the tenth book in the Mimmi series.

Originally written in Swedish, it has since been translated into and published in English.

== Plot ==
It is autumn and Mimmi is a seven and a half years old girl, while Roberta Karlsson is nine years old. They believe that Enok, who runs a shoestore, is a criminal. They follow him across the path towards a forest glade where he goes fishing at a tarn. Enok discovers the girls, and they begin to talk, before Enok returns to the store.

Mimmi and Roberta sneak into the shoe store and hide. Suddenly Enok activates the lights, discovering the girls. It appears Enok is no criminal and he becomes like a grandfather to the girls.
