= Monstret i skåpet =

1979 book by Viveca Sundvall

- Author: Viveca Lärn
- Illustrator: Eva Eriksson
- Language: Swedish
- Series: Mimmi
- Genre: Children's literature
- Published: 1979
- Publisher: Rabén & Sjögren
- Publication place: Sweden
- Followed by: En ettas dagbok

Monstret i skåpet (The Monster in the Cupboard) is a 1979 children's book by Viveca Sundvall. The book is the first in the Mimmi series.

== Plot ==
6-year-old Mimmi keeps a diary. Only she and her friend Anders know that a monster lives inside a cabinet at the Kindergarten they go to. They believe the monster is inside a cabinet in the Kindergarten teacher's office.
