= En barkbåt till Eddie =

1992 children's book by Viveca Sundvall

- Author: Viveca Sundvall
- Language: Swedish
- Series: Eddie
- Genre: Children's literature
- Published: 1992
- Publisher: Rabén & Sjögren
- Publication place: Sweden
- Preceded by: Eddie och Maxon Jaxon
- Followed by: Eddie och Johanna

En barkbåt till Eddie is a 1992 children's book by Viveca Sundvall. The book is the second in the Eddie series and is set in western Sweden.

The book was nominated to the August Prize in the category "Swedish children's and youth book of the year".
