= Åshöjdens BK (TV series) =

- Genre: youth
- Based on: Åshöjdens BK
- Country of origin: Sweden
- Original language: Swedish
- No. of seasons: 1
- No. of episodes: 12

Original release
- Network: TV2
- Release: 13 April – 29 June 1985

Åshöjdens BK is a 1985 TV series, based on the Max Lundgren book series Åshöjdens BK about a fictional Swedish football sports club team in Skåne called that same name.
