= Eddie och Johanna =

1993 book by Viveca Sundvall

- Author: Viveca Sundvall
- Language: Swedish
- Series: Eddie
- Genre: Children's literature
- Set in: Lysekil, Sweden
- Published: 1993
- Publisher: Rabén & Sjögren
- Publication place: Sweden
- Preceded by: En barkbåt till Eddie
- Followed by: Eddies hus

Eddie och Johanna is a 1993 children's book by Viveca Sundvall and the third book in the Eddie series. The story was the basis for the 1994 TV series Håll huvet kallt.

== Plot ==
Eddie travels to Lysekil to meet his aunt Soffan, and breath freash air, which is healthy because of his asthma. There he becomes friend with a girl named Johanna.
