= Vägen till Gyllenblå! =

- Genre: Sci-fi
- Written by: Roar Skolmen
- Directed by: Leif Krantz
- Country of origin: Sweden
- Original language: Swedish
- No. of seasons: 1
- No. of episodes: 5

Production
- Running time: 30 min

Original release
- Network: SVT2
- Release: 29 December 1985

Vägen till Gyllenblå! (English: The Road to Golden Blue) is a Swedish science fiction TV miniseries that premiered on 29 December 1985.

== Plot summary ==
Two children are set to bring back laughter to the planet Gyllenblå.

== Cast list ==
- Maria Tornlund as Cecilie
- Erik Lindgren as Fredrik
- Liv Alsterlund as Galaxia
- Sven-Erik Vikström as Ratio Rasch
- Kim Anderzon as Kubina
- Christina Carlwind as Jörgensen / Supernova
- Maria Hedborg as Karin / Epicykel
- Tuncel Kurtiz as Dr. Krull
- Peder Falk as Foton
- Lennart Tollén as Eon
- Benny Haag as Meteor
