= Eddie (book series) =

Children's book series by Viveca Sundvall

Eddie series
- Author: Viveca Lärn
- Original title: Eddieserien
- Illustrator: Eva Eriksson
- Cover artist: Eva Eriksson
- Country: Sweden
- Language: Swedish
- Genre: Children's literature
- Publisher: Rabén & Sjögren
- Published: 1991–2001
- No. of books: 6
- Preceded by: Mimmi

The Eddie series (Swedish: Eddieserien) is a book series written by Viveca Lärn (earlier Viveca Sundvall) about Eddie, a boy in early primary school. The books were originally published between 1991 and 2001, and make up a spin-off series set in the Mimmi universe. The books are told from a third-person perspective and the main character, Eddie, is the brother of Mimmi's friend Anders. Eddie's father is an alcoholic when the stories begin.

In 1994, a television series based on the books and named Håll huvet kallt was produced. It aired as Sveriges Television's Christmas calendar that year.

== Books ==
Title	Year of publication
Eddie och Maxon Jaxon	1991
En barkbåt till Eddie	1992
Eddie och Johanna	1993
Eddies hus	1994
Håll huvet kallt, Eddie!	1995
Eddie hittar guld	2001
