= Vi smyger på Enok =

1985 children's book by Viveca Sundvall

- Author: Viveca Sundvall
- Illustrator: Eva Eriksson
- Cover artist: Eva Eriksson
- Language: Swedish
- Series: Mimmi
- Genre: Children's literature
- Published: 1985
- Publisher: Rabén & Sjögren
- Publication place: Sweden
- Preceded by: Roberta Karlsson och kungen
- Followed by: Mimmi och kalla handen

Vi smyger på Enok is a 1985 children's book by Viveca Sundvall and the fourth book in the Mimmi series. Written as a diary, it is set between 19 August and 26 December the year Mimmi goes in the second grade. Together with En ettas dagbok and Roberta Karlsson och kungen they were later all released in a collection called Mimmis bok.

For the book, Viveca Sundvall was awarded the Astrid Lindgren Prize in 1985.

== Plot ==
Mimmi and Roberta sneak on Enok, a man who is almost 60 years old and runs a shoe store. The girls later decide to "adopt" him as a "grandfather". The book is more serious as the previous, as Enok later gets ill and dies. Mimmi and Roberta later hold an own memorial service for him instead of attending the ordinary funeral.
