= Christer Flodin =

Swedish television actor

- Born: Stockholm, Sweden
- Years active: 1992-present

Christer Flodin (born September 1, 1948 in Stockholm) is a Swedish television actor, best known for his appearances in crime drama series.

In 1992 he appeared in the miniseries Ett Äktenskap i kris and in 1994 he appeared in the crime thriller series Stockholm Marathon. In 1996 he starred as Dr. Josefsson in the series Skilda världar. In 2003 he had a small role in the Clas Lindberg directed comedy film Don't Cry Wolf.
