= Eddie och Maxon Jaxon =

1992 children's book by Viveca Sundvall

- Author: Viveca Sundvall
- Language: Swedish
- Series: Eddie
- Genre: Children's literature
- Published: 1991
- Publisher: Rabén & Sjögren
- Publication place: Sweden
- Followed by: En barkbåt till Eddie

Eddie och Maxon Jaxon is a 1992 children's book by Swedish writer Viveca Sundvall. The book is the first in the Eddie series, a spin-off set in the same universe as the Mimmi series. Both Mimmi and Anders appear in the book.

The book won the 1992 Nils Holgersson Plaque in the category "Swedish children's and youth book of the year".

== Plot ==
By August, Eddie will start school and he doesn't look forward to it. He would rather like to have a real job, like camel-keeper, because things aren't so free at school. His idols are Maradona, Madonna and "Maxon Jaxon". His father is single and alcoholic.
