= Håll huvet kallt =

- Genre: Children's television series
- Based on: Eddie och Johanna
- Written by: Viveca Lärn
- Starring: André Lidholm; Emelie Heilmann; Tomas von Brömssen; Johan Larén; Birgit Carlstén; Göran Ragnerstam; Per Oscarsson
- Composer: Thomas Sundström
- Country of origin: Sweden
- Original language: Swedish
- No. of seasons: 1
- No. of episodes: 24

Production
- Running time: 15
- Production company: Sveriges Radio-TV

Original release
- Network: Kanal 1
- Release: 1 December – 24 December 1994

Related
- Tomtemaskinen (1993); Jul i Kapernaum (1995)

Håll huvet kallt (Keep Calm) is the Sveriges Television's Christmas calendar in 1994. It is based on the book Eddie och Johanna by Viveca Lärn.

== Plot ==
Seven-year old Eddie travels by bus from Gothenburg to Lysekil to visit his aunt and uncle. His mother is dead, and his father is an alcoholic.
