= Evabritt Strandberg =

Swedish actress and singer

- Born: 7 April 1943 (age 81); Stockholm, Sweden
- Occupations: Actress; singer
- Years active: 1965–present
- Spouses: Lars-Erik Berenett (m. 1971; div. 1976) Olle Ljungberg (m. 1984; div. 1985)
- Partners: Sven Wollter (1966–1970); Christer Wickman (1987–2000; his death)
- Children: 2

Evabritt Strandberg (born 7 April 1943) is a Swedish actress and singer.

Evabritt Strandberg belongs to the artist-rich family Strandberg. She is half-sister to Charlott Strandberg and granddaughter to Olle Strandberg.

She has been married to Sven Wollter (they have the daughter Lina Wollter) and to Lars-Erik Berenett (they have the son Matti Berenett).

Strandberg wanted to be veterinary physician, but her grades in mathematics, physics, and chemistry were not good enough. Instead, she decided to work in theatre; she studied at the Royal Dramatic Training Academy from 1962 to 1965.

Strandberg worked at the Royal Dramatic Theatre 1965–67 and at the National Swedish Touring Theatre 1967–68. From 1968–83, she was engaged at Gothenburg City Theatre.

As a singer, Strandberg released her LP En sång ett vapen ("A song, a weapon") in 1965. She has interpreted songs by Jacques Brel, Édith Piaf, Lars Forssell and Cornelis Vreeswijk. In 1995, she received the Cornelis Vreeswijk Scholarship with the motive "En sångkonst av stor bärighet och styrka, rå och sovrad intensitet som kongenialt gestaltar tillvarons gläde och sorg, en formulering som även kan räcka hennes skådespeleri" ("A song-art of great buoyancy and strength, raw and sifted intensity which congenially portrays life's happy and sad, a formulation that also may suffice her acting").

== Filmography ==
=== Film ===
Year	Title	Role	Notes
1965	Love 65	Herself	
1988	Råttornas vinter	Carina	

=== Television ===
Year	Title	Role	Notes
1981	Stjärnhuset	—	
1982	Polisen som vägrade svara	Erika Johansson	
1985	Lösa förbindelser	Clair	
1991	Sanning och konsekvens	Elisabeth	
1991	Rosenholm	Louise de Witt	
1995	Radioskugga	Gun	
2000	Barnen på Luna	Torsten's grandmother	
2001	Gustav III:s äktenskap	Louisa Ulrika	
