= Öbergs på Lillöga =

- Directed by: Leif Krantz
- Country of origin: Sweden
- Original language: Swedish
- No. of episodes: 10

Original release
- Release: 1 March 1983 – 1983

Öbergs på Lillöga was a Swedish television series, set in archipelago environment, that aired in 1983.

== Cast ==
- Catharina Alinder as Eva Öberg
- Sickan Carlsson as Britta
- Stig Engström as Stig Öberg
- Stig Grybe as Carlsson
- Benny Haag as Bosse Öberg
- Karl-Arne Holmsten as Shop Keeper
- Jan-Eric Lindquist as Fritiof
- Lena Strömdahl as Margit Öberg
- Ulf Eklund as Evert

== See also ==
- List of Swedish television series
