= Tomtemaskinen =

- Genre: children
- Created by: Sven Nordqvist
- Based on: Pettson and Findus
- Written by: Birgit Hageby; Sven Nordqvist
- Directed by: Torbjörn Ehrnvall
- Starring: Ingvar Hirdwall; Ika Nord; Björn Granath
- Country of origin: Sweden
- Original language: Swedish
- No. of seasons: 1
- No. of episodes: 24

Original release
- Network: Kanal 1, TV2
- Release: 1 December – 24 December 1993

Related
- Klasses julkalender (1992); Håll huvet kallt (1994)

Tomtemaskinen ("The Santa Claus Machine") is the Sveriges Television's Christmas calendar in 1993. The story is based on Sven Nordqvist's books about Pettson and Findus.

== Plot ==
Pettson has promised the cat Findus that Santa Claus will come for Christmas. He decides to build a "Santa Machine".

== Reruns ==
The series was shown as a rerun in SVT 2 between 12 September-9 November 1998.

== Video ==
The series was released to VHS in 1997 by Independent Entertainment. and to DVD in by Pan Vision.
