= Jul i Kapernaum =

- Genre: children
- Country of origin: Sweden
- Original language: Swedish
- No. of seasons: 1
- No. of episodes: 24

Original release
- Network: Kanal 1
- Release: 1 December – 24 December 1995

Related
- Håll huvet kallt (1994); Mysteriet på Greveholm (1996)

Jul i Kapernaum ("Christmas in Capernaum") is the Sveriges Television's Christmas calendar in 1995.

== Plot ==
The show is a fantasy-musical set in the small town of Kapernaum.

== Video ==
The series was released to VHS in 1997. and to DVD on 27 October 2006.
