= Carina Dahl (writer) =

Swedish writer and film director

- Born: 27 July 1962

Carina Yvonne Dahl (born 27 July 1962) is a Swedish writer and film director.

She was born in Täby. Dahl wrote the script for the television series Dieselråttor & sjömansmöss ("Diesel Rats and Sailor Mice"), which was Sveriges Television's Christmas calendar for 2002. Her novels Familjelyckan (2008) and Det stora svenska vemodet (2009) formed the basis for the 2011 film Kronjuvelerna ("The Crown Jewels"). In 2014, she completed the novel Kronjuvelerna which expanded the family saga told in the previous works. Dahl has written screenplays for short films such as Happy, which she also directed, and Moltas Swingsters. She has also written a column for a Swedish horse magazine.

Dahl and her family have lived on a large ship in the North Sea for twenty years. She now spends part of her time in Gotland
