= The Wild Baby =

Children's book series by Barbro Lindgren

- Author: Barbro Lindgren
- Original title: Den vilda bebin
- Illustrator: Eva Eriksson
- Cover artist: Eva Eriksson
- Country: Sweden
- Language: Swedish
- Genre: Children's literature
- Published: 1980–1985
- No. of books: 3

The Wild Baby (Swedish: Den vilda bebin) is a children's book series about a wild young infant boy named Ben, written by Barbro Lindgren and illustrated by Eva Eriksson. In 2010, it was made into puppetry.

== Books ==
Title	Year
The Wild Baby (Mamman och den vilda bebin)	1980 - English edition (1981)
The Wild Baby Goes to Sea (Den vilda bebiresan)	1982 - English edition (1983) adapted by Jack Prelutsky
The Wild Baby's Dog (Vilda bebin får en hund)	1985
