= Åshöjdens BK =

Book series by Max Lundgren

- Åshöjdens BK organization
- First appearance: Åshöjdens bollklubb (1967)

In-universe information
- Type: football club
- Location: Scania, Sweden

Åshöjdens BK is a book series about a fictional football club in northwestern Scania, Sweden, created by Max Lundgren. It also appeared as a comic strip in Buster.

== Plot ==
Appearing in a series of four novels, it depicts a football club being promoted across a promotion and relegation-based Swedish league system before losing the Allsvenskan qualifying game. In 1985, a TV series based on the book series was made.

Sometimes, sports journalists talk of the "real Åshöjdens BK" when a club, often in rural districts, within some seasons is quickly promoted from the lower to higher divisions. An example is Ljungskile SK's promotion during the early to mid-1990s.

== Books ==
- Åshöjdens bollklubb (1967)
- Åshöjden går vidare (1968)
- Kris i Åshöjdens BK (1969)
- Åshöjden i kvalet (1971)
