= Sandsborgskyrkogården =

Cemetery in Gamla Enskede, Stockholm, Sweden

Coordinates: 59.2819°N 18.0966°E

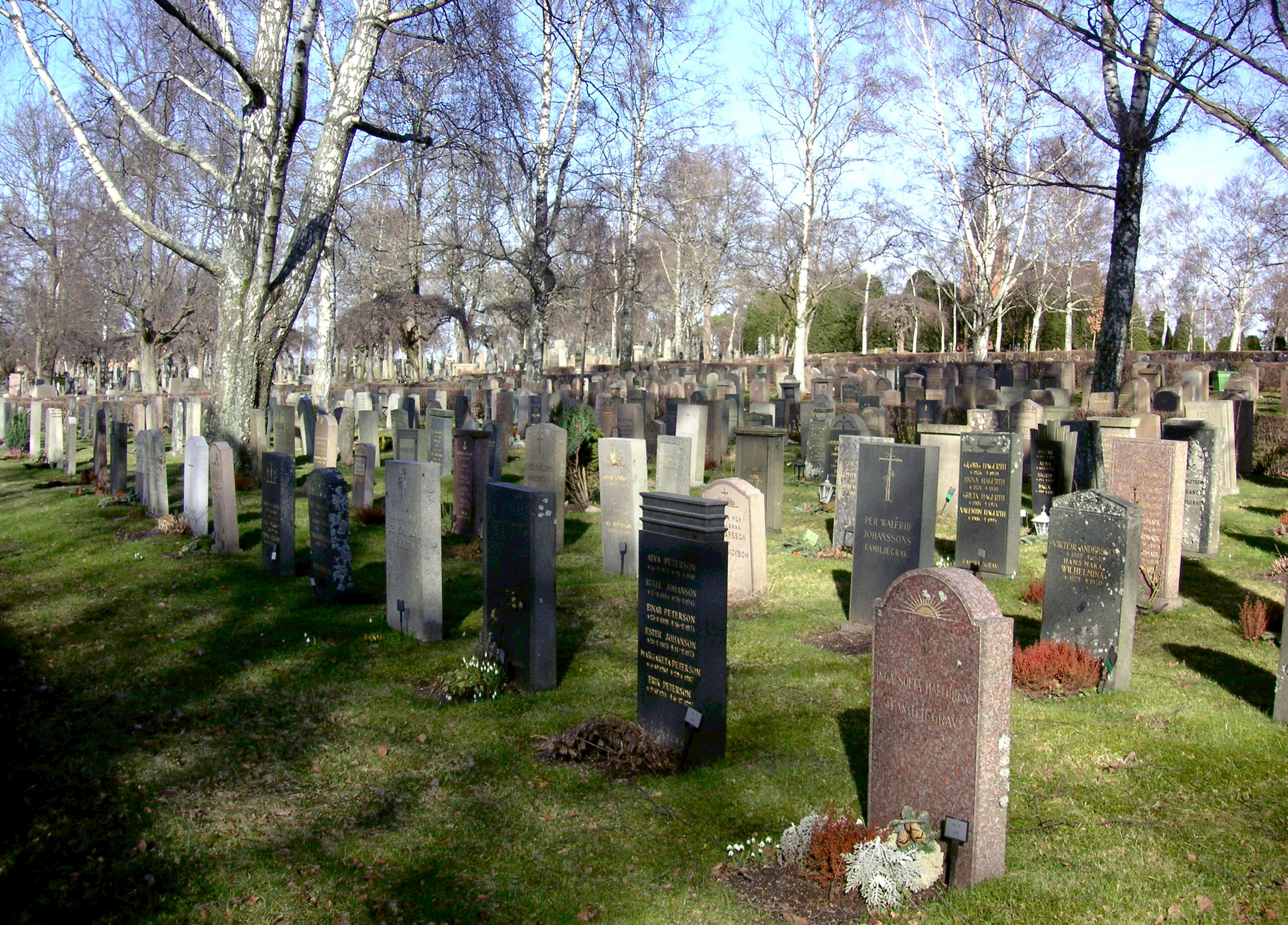
Sandsborgskyrkogården in March 2008.

Sandsborgskyrkogården is a cemetery in Gamla Enskede in Stockholm, Sweden, established in 1895.

== Location ==
Sandsborgskyrkogården is located immediately to the north of Skogskyrkogården, a UNESCO World Heritage Site cemetery.

== Notable burials ==
- Lars-Erik Berenett (1942–2017), actor, screenwriter, singer
- Ture Hedman (1895–1950), Olympic Gold Medal gymnast
- Quorthon (1966–2004), musician
