= Liquor Party =

- Founder: Benny Haag
- Founded: 2009
- Ideology: Single-issue

Website
- www.spritpartiet.se

The Liquor Party (Swedish: Spritpartiet) is a former political party in Sweden, that was established as an across-political boundaries single-issue party with policies that majored on the health effects of the consumption of alcohol. The party was founded, in 2009, by actor Benny Haag. They ran in the 2010 Swedish general election on September 19; it gained 237 votes, becoming the 13th biggest party outside the parliament.

== See also ==
- Social welfare in Sweden
