= När karusellerna sover =

- Genre: children
- Written by: Hans Alfredsson
- Composer: Thomas Sundström
- Country of origin: Sweden
- Original language: Swedish
- No. of seasons: 1
- No. of episodes: 24

Original release
- Network: SVT1
- Release: 1 December – 24 December 1998

Related
- Pelle Svanslös (1997); Julens hjältar (1999)

När karusellerna sover ("When the carousels are sleeping") is the Sveriges Television's Christmas calendar in 1998. The screenplay was written by Hans Alfredsson.

== Plot ==
One day after school, Jack meets a dog leading him through an entrance to an amusement park, closed for winter. The dog runs through the entrance, followed by Jack.

== Video ==
The series was released to VHS in 1999 and DVD in 2006. The soundtrack music was released to CD in 1998 by the Independent Entertainment record label.
