= Sam (book series) =

Swedish children's book series by Barbro Lindgren

Max
- Author: Barbro Lindgren
- Illustrator: Eva Eriksson
- Cover artist: Eva Eriksson
- Country: Sweden
- Language: Swedish
- Genre: Children's literature
- Published: 1981–1994
- No. of books: 11

Sam (Swedish: Max) is a Swedish children's book series, written by Barbro Lindgren and illustrated by Eva Eriksson.

Sam was a major success in Sweden, and the most successful of Lindgren's books in the 1980s, and had a significant impact on the Swedish children's picture book market.

== Books ==
- Sam's Car (Max bil) – 1981
- Sam's Cookie/Sam's Biscuit (Max kaka) – 1981
- Sam's Teddy Bear/Sam's Teddy/Max's Bear (Max nalle) – 1981
- Sam's Bath/Max's Bath (Max balja) – 1982
- Sam's Ball (Max boll) – 1982
- Sam's Lamp/Bad Sam! (Max lampa) – 1982
- Sam's Potty (Max potta) – 1986
- Sam's Wagon/Sam's Cart/ Max Wagon (Max dockvagn) – 1986
- Titta Max grav! – 1991
- Max blöja – 1994
- Max napp – 1994
