= En ettas dagbok (TV series) =

- Genre: Children's television series
- Based on: En ettas dagbok
- Written by: Viveca Sundvall
- Directed by: Susann Frennberg
- Starring: Camilla Wickbom; Claudia Skolek; Pia Green; Kjell Bergqvist; Göthe Grefbo
- Composer: Sten Carlberg
- Country of origin: Sweden
- Original language: Swedish
- No. of seasons: 1
- No. of episodes: 6

Production
- Cinematography: Andreas Turai

Original release
- Network: TV1
- Release: 19 October – 23 November 1985

En ettas dagbok is a 1985 TV series based on the Viveca Sundvall's book of the same name. Viveca Sundvall also wrote screenplay.

The main character is diary-writing first grader girl Mimmi, who was played by Camilla Wickbom. Other roles were played by Claudia Skolek, Pia Green, Kjell Bergqvist and Göthe Grefbo.

The series originally aired over Sveriges Television's TV1 between 19 October and 23 November 1985. Reruns aired over the same channel between 27 April and 1 June 1996. Music was composed by Sten Carlberg, while photographer was Andreas Turai.
