= Ronny & Julia =

- Author: Måns Gahrton
- Illustrator: Johan Unenge
- Cover artist: Johan Unenge
- Country: Sweden
- Language: Swedish
- Genre: children
- Publisher: Bonnier Carlsen
- Published: 1995-2007
- No. of books: 13

Ronny & Julia is a book series by Måns Gahrton & Johan Unenge. A Swedish TV series version became the 2000 SVT Christmas calendar.

== Books ==
- Ronny & Julia : en historia om en som vill bli omtyckt - 1995
- Ronny & Julia längtar - 1996 (rerelased 2004)
- Ronny & Julia och tjejbacillerna - 1997
- Ronny & Julia sover över - 1998
- Ronny & Julia får en hund - 1999
- Ronny & Julia tror på tomten - 2000
- Ronny & Julia bästa kompisar - 2001
- Ronny & Julia rymmer - 2002
- Ronny & Julia börjar skolan - 2003
- Ronny & Julia och en miljon monster - 2005
- Ronny & Julia börjar skolan - 2005
- Ronny & Julia börjar skolan - 2006
- Ronny & Julia: läskigt och roligt - 2007
