= Charlott Strandberg =

Swedish revue-singer and actress (born 1962)

Charlott Maria Strandberg in 2011

Charlott Maria Strandberg (born 20 September 1962 in Täby, Sweden) is a Swedish revue-singer and actress. She belongs to the Strandberg family; she is granddaughter to Olle Strandberg and half-sister to Evabritt Strandberg.

== Selected filmography ==
- 1988 – Xerxes
- 1989 – Hajen som visste för mycket
- 1990 – Macken – Roy's & Roger's Bilservice
- 1994 – Bert
- 1994 & 1996 – Svensson, Svensson (TV)
- 1996 – Älskade Lotten (TV)
- 1996 – Monopol
- 2006 – LasseMajas detektivbyrå
- 2009 – Virus i bataljonen
