= Leif Krantz =

Swedish television producer, screenwriter and film director

- Died: 28 December 2012

John Leif Krantz (15 April 1932 – 28 December 2012) was a Swedish television producer, screenwriter and film director.

Leif Krantz was born in 1932 in Gothenburg. He began his career as an assistant director during the filming of Astrid Lindgren's Vi på Saltkråkan (1964). He broke through in the late 1960s with popular television dramas such as Kullamannen (1967) and Kråkguldet (1969), and later with Pojken med guldbyxorna (1975) and Sinkadus (1980). Krantz also wrote the screenplay for the animated films Peter-No-Tail (1981) and Agaton Sax och Byköpings gästabud (1976).

Leif Krantz died in 2012 in Sköndal south of Stockholm after brief illness.

== Filmography ==
- 1964: Vi på Saltkråkan (TV) - assistant director
- 1964: Tjorven, Båtsman och Moses (TV) - assistant director
- 1965: Modiga mindre män (TV) - director, screenplay
- 1967-1968: Kullamannen" (TV) - director
- 1969: Kråkguldet (TV) - director, screenplay
- 1972: Barnen i höjden (TV) - director, screenplay
- 1972: Stora skälvan (TV) - director, screenplay
- 1975: Pojken med guldbyxorna (TV) - director, screenplay
- 1976: Agaton Sax och Byköpings gästabud director, screenplay
- 1976: Schaurige Geschichten (TV) - director, screenplay
- 1977: Ärliga blå ögon (TV) director, screenplay
- 1977: Så går det till på Saltkråkan (TV) - assistant director
- 1980: Sinkadus (TV) - director, screenplay
- 1981: Pelle Svanslös - screenplay
- 1983: Öbergs på Lillöga (TV) director, screenplay
- 1985: Pelle Svanslös i Amerikatt - screenplay
- 1985: Vägen till Gyllenblå!" (TV) - director
- 1986: Skånska mord - Bessingemordet (TV) - director
- 1988 Stoft och skugga (TV) - director, screenplay
- 1989: Amforans gåta (TV) - director, screenplay
- 1993-1995: Snoken (TV) - director
- 2000 Ramakien (short film for TV) - director, screenplay
