= Sandra (1965 film) =

1965 Italian film

- Italian release poster
- Italian: Vaghe stelle dell'Orsa
- Directed by: Luchino Visconti
- Screenplay by: Suso Cecchi d'Amico; Enrico Medioli; Luchino Visconti
- Produced by: Franco Cristaldi
- Starring: Claudia Cardinale; Jean Sorel; Michael Craig; Renzo Ricci; Fred Williams; Amalia Troiani; Marie Bell
- Cinematography: Armando Nannuzzi
- Edited by: Mario Serandrei
- Music by: Cesar Franck
- Production company: Vides Cinematografica
- Distributed by: Columbia C.E.I.A.D.
- Release dates: 3 September 1965 (Venice); 16 September 1965 (Italy); 26 November 1965 (France)
- Running time: 105 minutes
- Countries: Italy; France
- Language: Italian

Sandra (Italian: Vaghe stelle dell'Orsa, lit. 'Glimmering stars of the Great Bear'), also known as Of These Thousand Pleasures, is a 1965 drama film directed and co-written by Luchino Visconti, and starring Claudia Cardinale, Jean Sorel, and Michael Craig. A modern-day retelling of the Electra story, the film centers on the incestuous relationship between a young Italian woman (Cardinale) and her brother (Sorel), on her return to their ancestral home of Volterra. It premiered at the 26th Venice International Film Festival, where it won the Golden Lion.

== Plot ==
Visconti's retelling of the Electra story starts with Sandra returning to her ancestral home in Italy. On the eve of an official ceremony commemorating the death of her Jewish father in a Nazi concentration camp, she revives a sexual involvement with her brother, which troubles her naive husband. The incestuous siblings determine to wreak revenge on their mother and stepfather, who supposedly denounced their father to the Nazis.

== Cast ==
- Claudia Cardinale as Sandra Dawdson
- Jean Sorel as Gianni Wald-Luzzati
- Michael Craig as Andrew Dawdson
- Renzo Ricci as Antonio Gilardini
- Fred Williams as Pietro Formari
- Amalia Troiani as Fosca - maid
- Marie Bell as Sandra's mother
- Vittorio Manfrino
- Renato Moretti
- Giovanni Rovini
- Paola Piscini
- Isacco Politi
- Ferdinando Scarfiotti as party guest

== Title ==
The Italian title, culled from the poem "Le ricordanze" by Giacomo Leopardi, could be translated as "Glimmering stars of the Great Bear", and has a strong resonance with the movie's plot:

Vaghe stelle dell'Orsa, io non credea
Tornare ancor per uso a contemplarvi
Sul paterno giardino scintillanti,
E ragionar con voi dalle finestre
Di questo albergo ove abitai fanciullo,
E delle gioie mie vidi la fine.(...)

English translation:

Glimmering stars of the Great Bear,
I never thought I'd be back to see you
Shining down on my father's garden,
Nor talk to you ever again from the windows
Of this house where I spent my childhood
And saw the last of my happiness vanish.(...)

== Production ==
The movie was shot on location in Volterra, a Tuscan town fifty miles southwest of Florence. Casa Inghrami and the Palazzo Viti were both used as settings for the family mansion there.

It was initially reported that the principal actors would voice their own parts in the English-language version of the film. Ultimately though they were dubbed by others.

This is the third of four films Claudia Cardinale made with Visconti, after Rocco and His Brothers (1960) and The Leopard (1963), followed by Conversation Piece (1974).

== Awards ==
The film won the Golden Lion at the Venice Film Festival.
