= Ett äktenskap i kris =

- Directed by: Vilgot Sjöman
- Country of origin: Sweden
- Original language: Swedish

Original release
- Network: TV4
- Release: 1992

Ett äktenskap i kris ("A Marriage in Crisis") is a Swedish mini drama television series that aired on TV4 in 1992.

== Cast ==
- Christer Flodin
- Sten Åke Siewert
- Margareta Wikholm

== See also ==
- List of Swedish television series
