= 1628 (TV series) =

1991 Swedish comedy television series

- Genre: Comedy
- Theme music composer: Lars Karlsand
- Country of origin: Sweden
- Original language: Swedish
- No. of episodes: 3

Production
- Producer: Pelle Norén

Original release
- Release: January 19 – February 2, 1991

1628 is a Swedish comedy television series. It was first broadcast in 1991. It is set in the year 1628 during the war of Sweden against Poland.

the famous composer Lars Karlsand made the theme song
