= Mimmi (TV series) =

- Genre: Children's television series
- Created by: Viveca Sundvall
- Based on: Mimmi
- Starring: Maria von Euler; Cecilia Nilsson; Magnus Nilsson
- Country of origin: Sweden
- Original language: Swedish
- No. of seasons: 1
- No. of episodes: 6

Production
- Producer: Waldemar Bergendahl

Original release
- Network: Kanal 1
- Release: 21 October – 27 November 1988

Mimmi is a 1988 TV series based on the Viveca Sundvall's book series of the same name. It originally aired over Kanal 1 between 21 October and 27 November.

== Episodes ==
1. Ett steg fram och två tillbaka
2. Hipp, hipp, hurra
3. God Jul lilla gris
4. Henrys bröd! Magens död!
5. Apor! Tigrar! och pingviner!
6. Monstret i skåpet
