= Studio S =

- Presented by: Göran Elwin

Production
- Production location: Sweden
- Production company: Sveriges Television

Original release
- Release: 20 March 1984

Studio S was a Swedish TV show broadcast on SVT during the late 1970s and early 1980s. Hosted by Göran Elwin, it dealt with current events.

== The Videovåld scandal ==
Despite covering many issues, the show is now mainly known (and infamous) for an episode broadcast on December 2, 1980, entitled "Vem behöver videon (who needs video)?". The episode raised concerns over violent movies on video and the notion that they were being viewed by children. Reporters interviewed children who claimed that they had seen movies such as The Texas Chain Saw Massacre and showed that children could easily rent violent videos. They then held a debate on how to deal with the issue, featuring a group of parents who all agreed that they could not stop their children from viewing these movies. Representing the government of Sweden was the Swedish Minister of Education Jan-Erik Wikström (fp) who wanted a ban but stressed that it required a change in the constitution of Sweden.

The episode spawned the buzzword videovåld (lit Video-violence), and a major moral panic that would shape public perception and even influence new laws. In the end the movies demonized by the show were more helped than harmed, as the exposure made them famous. Today the whole thing is widely regarded as an example of sensationalism and the videovåld controversy is mostly over. The Swedish DVD-cover for The Texas Chain Saw Massacre even mentions the episode and proudly claims to have been "the most hated movie in Sweden!".

Because of its cultural significance, the episode has become a cult item among film enthusiasts who see it both as an important document on the issue of censorship, and as unintentional comedy. It has been shown in film-festivals and is circulated as Bootlegs.

A parallel can be made to the UK debate on Video Nasties.

== Controversy ==
In 2002 Filmkrönikan ran a feature on the old episode where two of the children (now 33 years old) featured in the original broadcast claimed that they had been bribed, and were forced to say that they had seen violent movies. Other parts of the episode were also criticized, including one segment were a little girl claimed that she could not sleep with the nightlight off after seeing one of the videos in question. Her parents found this strange since she did not have a nightlight.

A reporter who worked on Studio S wrote an angry open letter where he denounced the feature as bad journalism, denying that the children were forced and that the harsh criticism of violent movies was valid. A representative of SVT denied the accusation.
