= Julens hjältar =

- Genre: children
- Country of origin: Sweden
- Original language: Swedish
- No. of seasons: 1
- No. of episodes: 24

Original release
- Network: SVT1
- Release: 1 December – 24 December 1999

Related
- När karusellerna sover (1998); Ronny & Julia (2000)

Julens hjältar ("The Heroes of Christmas") is the Sveriges Television's Christmas calendar in 1999.

== Plot ==
By mistake, a box with Christmas tree decorations have ended up at the wrong place during the Christmas preparations.

== Video ==
The series was released to VHS and DVD on 19 November 2001.
