= Ronny & Julia (TV series) =

- Genre: children
- Based on: Ronny & Julia
- Country of origin: Sweden
- Original language: Swedish
- No. of seasons: 1
- No. of episodes: 24

Original release
- Network: SVT1
- Release: 1 December – 24 December 2000

Related
- Julens hjältar (1999); Kaspar i Nudådalen (2001)

Ronny & Julia is the Sveriges Television's Christmas calendar in 2000.

== Plot ==
The series is based on the Måns Gahrton and Johan Unenge books about Ronny & Julia, and is a modern retelling of William Shakespeare's Romeo and Juliet, but friendly to children and family, and with a happy ending.

== Video ==
The series was released to VHS in the year 2000. and to DVD on 27 October 2006.
