= Lars-Erik Berenett =

Swedish actor (1942–2017)

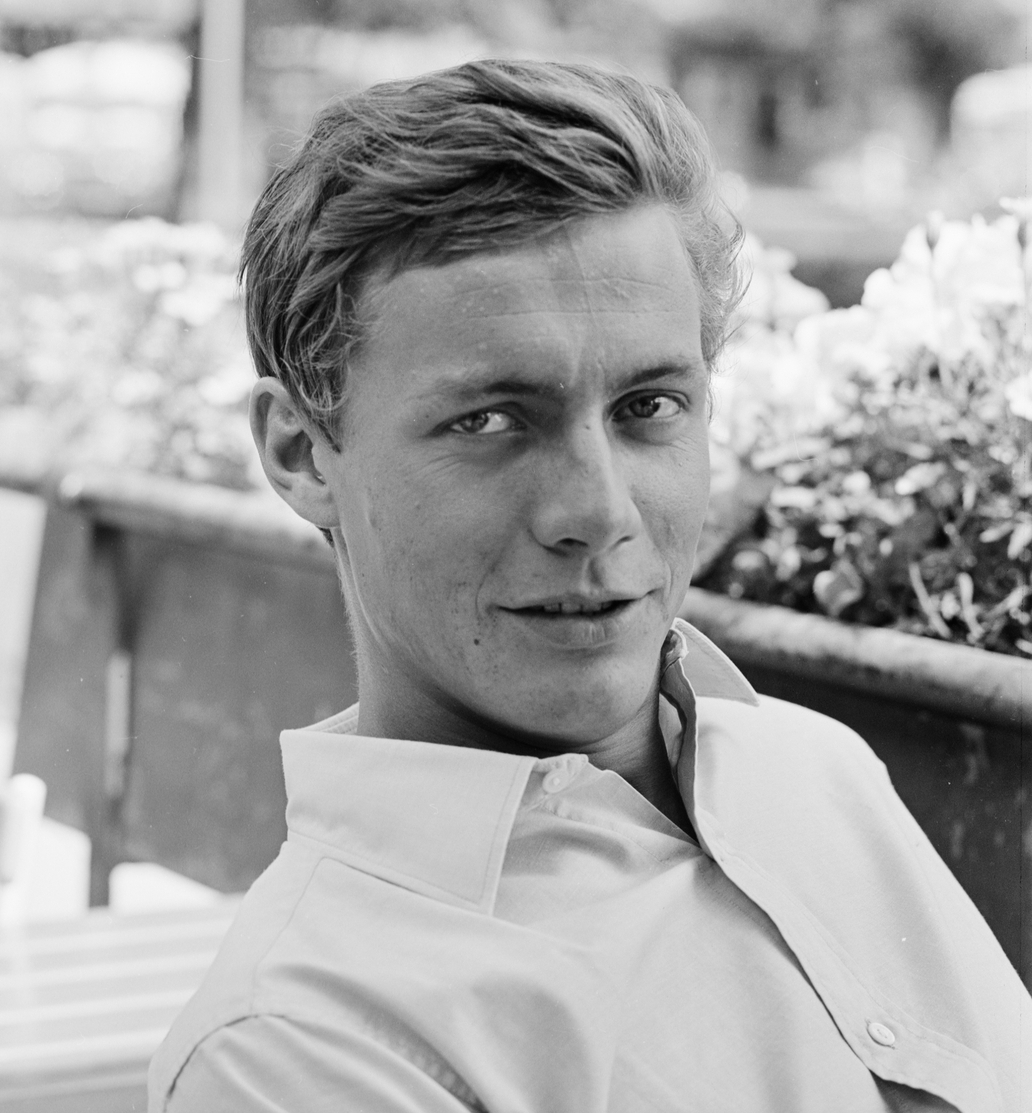
- Berenett in 1964
- Born: 23 December 1942; Skellefteå, Sweden
- Died: 1 February 2017 (aged 74); Värmdö, Sweden
- Resting place: Sandsborgskyrkogården
- Occupation: Actor
- Years active: 1964–2015
- Spouse: Evabritt Strandberg (m. 1971; div. 1976)
- Partner: Maria Kulle
- Children: 2 (including Matti)

Lars-Erik Berenett (23 December 1942 – 1 February 2017) was a Swedish actor. His career spanned more than 50 years, gaining recognition for his performances in film, television, and theatre, until two years before his death in 2017. Berenett made his theatrical debut in 1967 and continued to act in leading roles such as Jean in Miss Julie and Edgar in Dödsdansen.

Berenett was born in Skellefteå and grew up in Uppsala. He made his film debut in Vilgot Sjöman's Klänningen (1964). Berenett portrayed the police officer Roland Hassel in a total of 12 movies filmed and released between 1986–1992 and later in 2000 and 2012.

He died on 1 February 2017, after complications from a short-term illness in his home in Värmdö at the age of 74.

== Early life ==
Lars-Erik Berenett was born on 23 December 1942 in Skellefteå, but grew up in Uppsala. After working a time at sea, he found a job in a record store in Uppsala. During that time, he was discovered by amateur theater director Paul Patera, who arranged a scholarship for Berenett under the direction of Medborgarskolan's theater. Through additional scholarships, Berenett had the opportunity to study further at Calle Flygare's Theater School and at the Stage School in Gothenburg between 1964 and 1967. After graduating, he joined the Gothenburg City Theatre, where he remained until 1983.

== Career ==
In addition to theater, Berenett was active in film and television. Berenett made his professional acting debut in Vilgot Sjöman's Klänningen in 1964 where he played the messenger of Maison Georges. He is best known for his role as the temperamental police officer Roland Hassel in twelve films, made in 1986–1992 and in 2000 and 2012. He is also known for the role of Harald Bovallius in the soap opera Skilda världar, a role he played in over 300 episodes in the years 1996–1998. Berenett also often played villain roles, for example as the bank robber Erik Stigertz in the TV miniseries Polisen som vägrade svara (1982), a gangster called Charlie in the series Spanarna (1983) and the bomb man Rikard Kostner in the thriller series Den svarta cirkeln (1990). In contrast to the villain roles, he portrayed some likeable characters, such as the land-surveyor in Lars Molin's TV series Tre kärlekar (1989–1991). Berenett also played roles in Lars Norén productions such as Natten är dagens mor (1984) and Kaos är granne med Gud (1984).

== Personal life ==
Berenett married the actress Evabritt Strandberg in 1971. The marriage lasted five years, and they had a son together, the actor Matti Berenett (born 1971). He and his son played the roles of father and son in the series Skilda världar. A short time after his divorce with Strandberg, Berenett started a relationship with the actress Maria Kulle, with whom he had a second son.

== Death ==
On 1 February 2017, Berenett died in his home in Värmdö, aged 74. According to his partner Maria Kulle's representative, Peter Jansson, he had died peacefully with his family at his side. The cause of his death was a short-term illness. Berenett is buried at Sandsborgskyrkogården in Stockholm.

== Filmography ==
=== Film ===
Year	Title	Role	Notes	Ref.
1964	The Dress	Maison Georges' Messenger		
1965	Flygplan saknas	Göran, Inga's Brother		
1972	Georgia, Georgia	Reception Clerk		
1980	Barnens ö	Esbjörn		
1981	Tuppen	German		
1987	Friends	Police Inspector		
1987	Mälarpirater	Jonte Nyman		
1989	Änglahund	Charlie	Voice	
1991	Amelia	Gösta Leijon		
1991	Marianne	—N/a	Short film	
1994	Good Night Irene	Staffan		
1994	Dreamplay	Officer		
1995	Kristin Lavransdotter	Bjørn		
1996	Den vita lejoninnan	Sällgren		
2000	Hassel – Förgörarna	Roland Hassel		
2002	Tinke	—N/a		
2005	Störst av allt	Bagman		
2005	Van Veeteren – Borkmanns punkt	Bausen		
2007	Väsenpumpen	Bror		
2011	Stockholm East	Katti's Father		
2012	Hassel – Privatspanarna	Roland Hassel		
2013	Bäst före	Erik	Final film role	

=== Television ===
Year	Title	Role	Notes	Ref.
1971	Leka med elden	Axel, The Friend	Television movie	
1971	Amala Kamala	Price	Television movie	
1971	Söndagspromenaden	Carl Michael Coriander	Television movie	
1971	Här ligger en hund begraven	Dr. Bore	TV miniseries	
1972	Dela lika	Anders	TV miniseries	
1973	Hem till byn	Ingrid's Psychiatrist	1 episode	
1973	Desertören	Eddie Slovik	Television movie	
1976	Kamrer Gunnarsson i skärgården	Ragnar	Television movie	
1980	Innan vintern kommer	Sven	TV miniseries	
1981	Stjärnhuset	—N/a	Voice; 2 episodes	
1982	Polisen som vägrade svara	Erik Stigertz	TV miniseries	
1983	Spanarna	Charlie	Episode: "Happy Birthday"	
1984	Natten är dagens mor	Frank	Television movie	
1984	Kaos är granne med Gud	Frank	Television movie	
1984–85	Svenska brott	Ingvar Hellner	1 episode	
1985	Rød snø	The Lieutenant	TV miniseries, 1 episode	
1985	Nya Dagbladet	Lennart		
1986	Gösta Berlings saga	Liljecrona	TV miniseries	
1986	Den nervöse mannen	Mysterious Man	Television movie	
1986	Prästkappan	von Helffen	TV miniseries, 2 episodes	
1986	Hassel – Anmäld försvunnen	Roland Hassel	Television movie	
1986	Hassel – Beskyddarna	Roland Hassel	Television movie	
1986	Kunglig toilette	Carl XVI Gustaf	Television movie	
1987	Ondskans år	Tomas	Television movie	
1987	Saxofonhallicken	Kalor	Television movie	
1988	Fyra dagar som skakade Sverige	Erik Boheman	Television movie	
1988	Behöriga äga ej tillträde	Ernst Trygger	Television movie	
1988	Kråsnålen	Manufacturer Junggren	TV miniseries	
1989	Hassel – Slavhandlarna	Roland Hassel	Television movie	
1989	Hassel – Säkra papper	Roland Hassel	Television movie	
1989	Hassel – Terrorns finger	Roland Hassel	Television movie	
1989	Hassel – Offren	Roland Hassel	Television movie	
1989–1991	Tre kärlekar	Land-surveyor	4 episodes	
1990	Den svarta cirkeln	Rikard Kostner	TV miniseries	
1992	Hassel – De giriga	Roland Hassel	Television movie	
1992	Hassel – Svarta banken	Roland Hassel	Television movie	
1992	Hassel – Botgörarna	Roland Hassel	Television movie	
1992	Hassel – Utpressarna	Roland Hassel	Television movie	
1993	Hedda Gabler	Deputy Judge Brack	Television movie	
1994	Onkel Vanja	Astrov		
1996	Alla dagar alla nätter	Henrik	Television movie	
1996–98	Skilda världar	Harald Bovallius	425 episodes	
1998	Ivar Kreuger	Tor Bonnier	TV miniseries, 2 episodes	
2003	Skeppsholmen	Linda's Father	1 episode	
2005	Kommissionen	Tryggve Hansberg	4 episodes	
2005	Kvalster	Sture	TV miniseries, 2 episodes	
2013	En pilgrims död	Johan Forselius	TV miniseries, 3 episodes	
2013	Molanders	Arne Molander		
2013–14	Äkta människor	Claes	8 episodes	
2015	Jordskott	Johan Thörnblad	6 episodes	

=== Theatre ===
Year	Title	Role	Notes	Ref.
1968	Victor eller När barnen tar makten	Victor	Gothenburg City Theatre	
1969	Your Own Thing	Sebastian	Gothenburg City Theatre	
1970	Don Juan	Don Carlos	Gothenburg City Theatre	
1970	Yvonne	Prince Philip	Gothenburg City Theatre	
