= Kaspar i Nudådalen =

- Genre: children
- Created by: Mikael Engström
- Written by: Hans Rosenfeldt; Pernilla Oljelund
- Directed by: Åsa Kalmér; Maria Weisby
- Country of origin: Sweden
- Original language: Swedish
- No. of seasons: 1
- No. of episodes: 24

Original release
- Network: SVT1
- Release: 1 December – 24 December 2001

Related
- Ronny & Julia (2000); Dieselråttor & sjömansmöss (2002)

Kaspar i Nudådalen ("Kaspar in the Nudå Valley") is the Sveriges Television's Christmas calendar in 2001.

== Plot ==
It's winter in the small village of Nudådalen, where Kasper lives. Living in the village are also his grandfather on his mother's side, general store-operator Atom-Ragnar, Åhman, and Lisa.

== Reruns ==
Reruns aired at Barnkanalen between 23 December 2009 – 7 January 2010.

== Video ==
The series was released to VHS and DVD on 24 October 2002.
