= Modiga mindre män =

- Directed by: Leif Krantz
- Written by: Leif Krantz
- Starring: Roland Grönros; Gunnar Ahlström; Ulla Carle
- Release date: 1965
- Running time: 85 minutes
- Country: Sweden
- Language: Swedish

Modiga mindre män is a 1965 Swedish children's film written and directed by Leif Krantz. It won a Special Jury Prize at the Venice Film Festival.
