= Matti Berenett =

Swedish actor

- Born: Lars-Matti Berenett; 10 August 1971 (age 54); Stockholm, Sweden
- Occupation: Actor
- Years active: 1980–present
- Children: 2
- Relatives: Lars-Erik Berenett (father); Evabritt Strandberg (mother)

Lars-Matti Berenett (born 10 August 1971) is a Swedish actor.

Berenett studied at Calle Flygares teaterskola in Stockholm. Until he became an actor he worked as chimney sweep and coach. He also played football for Spårvägen in the 1st division and for IFK Stockholm in the 3rd division. Berenett plays also in Hammarby's tuning handball team. Matti Berenett is son to the actors Lars-Erik Berenett and Evabritt Strandberg. Matti Berenett has two daughters.

== Filmography ==
=== Film ===
Year	Title	Role	Notes
1996	Augustitango	Guy at the pinball game	Short film
2001	Mellan himmel och hästben	—N/a	Short film
2001	Beck – Hämndens pris	Victor Bengtsson	
2002	Vexator	Vidar	Short film

=== Television ===
Year	Title	Role	Notes
1980	Innan vintern kommer	Evas son	
1996	Nudlar och 08:or	—N/a	
1996–2002	Skilda världar	Tom Bovallius	
