= Bondånger =

- Genre: comedy
- Country of origin: Sweden
- Original language: Swedish
- No. of seasons: 2
- No. of episodes: 14

Original release
- Network: SVT1
- Release: 25 November 1997 – 8 December 1998

Bondånger is a Swedish comedy TV series, originally airing over SVT 2 between 25 November 1997 – 8 December 1998. Appearing in the series were its creator Ronny Eriksson and Anna-Lotta Larsson.

== Plot ==
It's 1998, and the ideologies of free market economy has affected all of Europe. The series is set in a small Norrbotten village, "Bondånger", and the view of the political problems who have affected Norrland since the 1970s, with decreasing population and unemployment when people move to the southern parts of Sweden.
