= Loranga, Masarin och Dartanjang =

1969 novel by Barbro Lindgren

- Author: Barbro Lindgren
- Language: Swedish
- Genre: Children's literature
- Published: 1969
- Publication place: Sweden

Loranga, Masarin och Dartanjang is a Swedish children's novel written by Barbro Lindgren and published in 1969.

An English translation, titled Soda Pop, was released by Gecko Press in 2017. This edition features new illustrations by Lisen Adbåge.

== Plot summary ==
The story is about a boy, Masarin, and his dad, Loranga, who live together in a house. Out in the woodshed lives Masarin's grandfather, Dartanjang, who is hypochondriac (and suffering from slight dementia). Loranga, constantly wearing a robe and a floral tea cozy on his head, is a childish and irresponsible bohemian. Therefore, Masarin is usually the responsible one; for example, he is the one taking care of his great-grandfather who thinks he is a cuckoo and lives at the top of a pine tree in the forest. Masarin is not disturbed by this; he is delighted with the fact that his dad is playing silly games with him. For example, they often play hockey with an overripe tomato. Other characters in the book are Gustav the Thief, the Angry Old Man and the Hot Dog Vendor.

== Adaptations ==
- A stop motion-animated serial for Swedish national broadcasting Sveriges Television was broadcast in 1975, with voiceover by Toivo Pawlo.
- An animated film adaptation of the book was released in 2005.
- A play based on the book for the Stockholm Park Theatre was directed by Ellen Lamm in 2003.
- An opera adaptation at the Royal Swedish Opera in Stockholm debuted in 2006, with score by Carl Unander-Scharin.
- A comic book adaptation by Sara Olausson was published by Positiv Förlag in 2010.
