= Kråkguldet =

- Genre: Thriller (for children)
- Created by: Leif Krantz; Olle Mattsson
- Starring: Staffan Hallerstam; Stefan Feierbach; Maria Lindberg; Helena Reuterblad; Arne Källerud; Åke Grönberg
- Opening theme: "Balladen om kråkguldet" by Thorstein Bergman
- Country of origin: Sweden
- Original language: Swedish
- No. of episodes: 6

Production
- Executive producer: Olle Nordemar
- Production locations: Grythyttan, Västmanland
- Running time: 27 minutes (per episode)
- Production companies: Nord Art AB; Sveriges Radio

Original release
- Network: Sveriges Radio
- Release: 1969

Kråkguldet ("Crows Gold", literally "The Crow-Gold") is a Swedish television drama serial from 1969, directed by Leif Krantz and Olle Mattsson.

== Plot synopsis ==
The story takes place during the weeks before Christmas, in the small mining town of fictitious Granhyttan in Bergslagen, Sweden. One day, a suspicious couple, Signe and Orvar, arrives in the small town and retires in an abandoned hut. Nobody knows what they are up to; but strange things starts to happen as Staffan finds a gold-nugget while playing in a disused mine at Kråkberget ("Crow Mountain", literally "The Crow-Mountain") during a skiing trip with his schoolmates. Staffan believes that the nugget is a part of Skarp-Erik's gold, as his grandpa had told exciting stories about. The news about the gold discovery spread quickly and Staffan and his friends are soon pursued by curious schoolmates, school-staff and also the mysterious strangers. All this happens as the students are rehearsing for the nativity play before Christmas break.

== About the serial ==
Each part of the series begins with a brief synopsis by Tore Lindwall, who also played Staffan's grandfather. The main recording site was Grythyttan in Västmanland. The series premiered in 1969, and has been shown in the replay several times, including February–March in 1976, June–July in 1986 and December 1993-January in 1994.

== Sound track ==
- Open theme: "Balladen om kråkguldet" ("Ballad of the Crows Gold") by Leif Krantz (lyrics), and Thorstein Bergman (music).
- Music and songs for the nativity play, by Bo-Erik Gyberg:
  - "Vi har kommit ifrån öster, följt en stjärna natten lång ..." ("We have come from the east, followed a star all night ...");
  - "Herodes han hade sin skattkammar' full ..." ("Herod he had his treasure chambers full..."); and
  - "Herdarna ute på ängen ..." ("Shepherds out on the meadow ...").

== British showing ==
The series was imported by the BBC and translated into English as Gold on Crow Mountain. It was shown twice, from 3 November to 8 December 1971 and again from 31 March to 5 May 1973.

== Episodes ==
- Episode 1: Farligt område (Original Air Date: 29 November 1969)
- Episode 2: Huvet på ett fat (Original Air Date: 6 December 1969)
- Episode 3: Ingen dager synes än (Original Air Date: 13 December 1969)
- Episode 4: Jägare och villebråd (Original Air Date: 20 December 1969)
- Episode 5: Dags för Herodes (Original Air Date: 25 December 1969)
- Episode 6: Skarp-Eriks skatt (Original Air Date: 27 December 1969)

== Sources ==
- Kråkguldet, Internet Movie Database
