= Dieselråttor & sjömansmöss =

- Genre: children
- Directed by: Carina Dahl
- Country of origin: Sweden
- Original language: Swedish
- No. of seasons: 1
- No. of episodes: 24

Original release
- Network: SVT1
- Release: 1 December – 24 December 2002

Related
- Kaspar i Nudådalen (2001); Håkan Bråkan (2003)

Dieselråttor & sjömansmöss ("Diesel Rats & Sailor Mice") is the Sveriges Television's Christmas calendar in 2002.

== Plot ==
Two children and a group of rats are the main characters. The rats live on board a ship, and have shrunk the children.

== Music ==
Music from the series appeared on the 2004 compilation album Musik från STIM 2004 : ett urval av svenska kompositörer.

== Video ==
The series was released to VHS and DVD in 2003.
