= Max Lundgren =

Swedish children's writer (1937–2005)

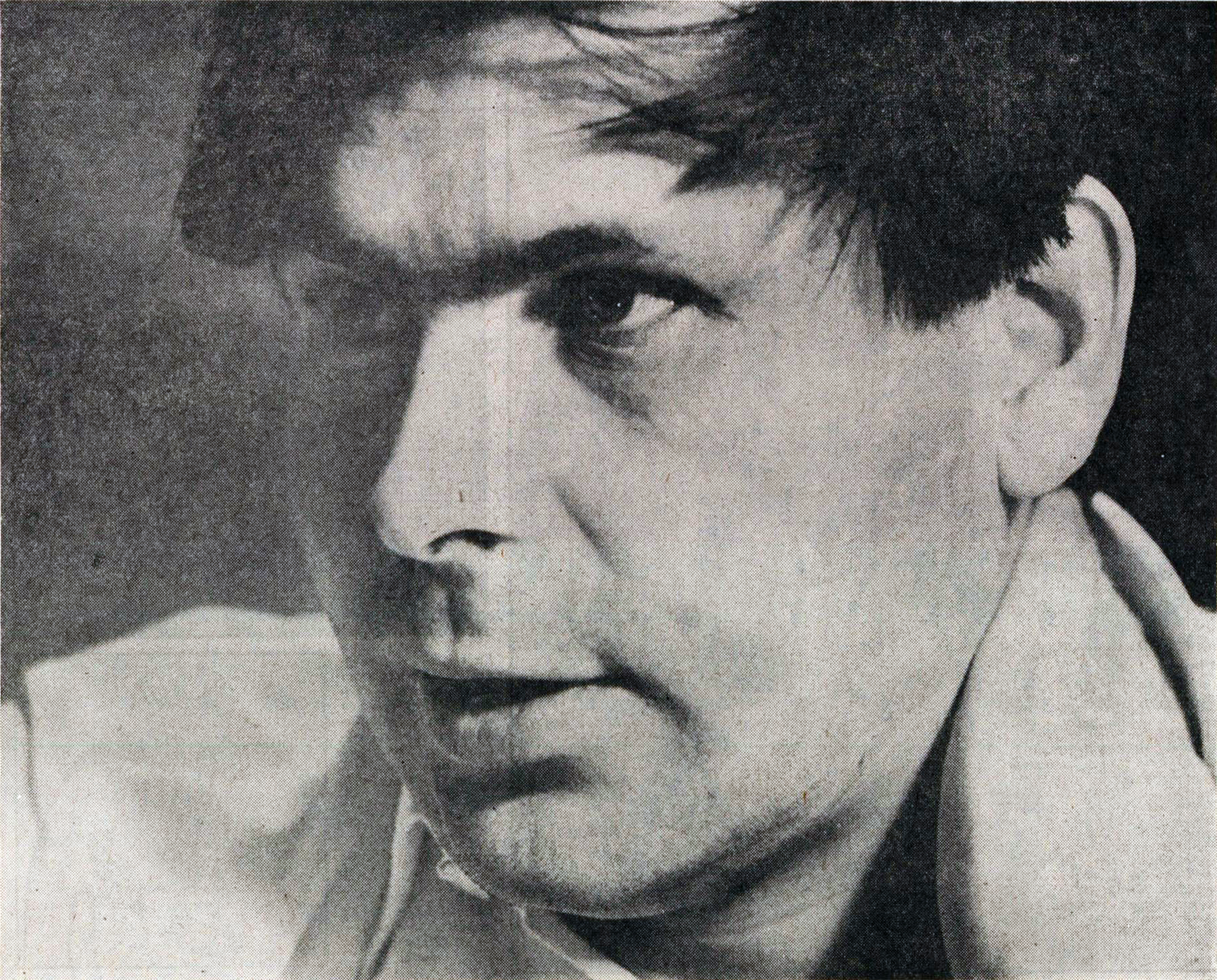
- Max Lundgren
- Born: 22 March 1937; Landskrona, Sweden
- Died: 27 May 2005 (aged 68); Malmö, Sweden
- Occupation: author

Max Lundgren (22 March 1937 – 27 May 2005) was a Swedish author of children's books. He debuted in 1962 with the book Hunden som äntligen visslade, and wrote over 50 books. Some of his books have become TV series, among other Pojken med guldbyxorna and his books about fictional Swedish football club Åshöjdens BK.

== Bibliography ==
- 1962: Hunden som äntligen visslade
- 1963: Kandidaterna
- 1964: Alla barns ansikten
- 1965: Gangsterboken
- 1965: Äventyrets fyra färger
- 1966: Omin Hambbe i Slättköping
- 1967: Pojken med guldbyxorna
- 1967: Åshöjdens bollklubb
- 1968: Dörrarna låsta inifrån
- 1968: Regnbågskriget
- 1968: Åshöjden går vidare
- 1969: Kris i Åshöjdens BK
- 1969: Sagan om Lotta från Dösjöbro
- 1969: Ole kallar mej Lise
- 1970: Mats farfar
- 1971: Sommarflickan
- 1971: Åshöjden i kvalet
- 1972: Snapphanepojken
- 1972: IFK Trumslagaren
- 1973: IFK Trumslagaren och Lillis
- 1975: IFK Trumslagaren och Chris
- 1976: Myrorna
- 1978: Ännu minns jag Birthe
- 1978: Boken om Birthe
- 1978: Lättsinniga berättelser och andra noveller
- 1979: IFK Trumslagaren och Lasse
- 1979: Våning för fyra
- 1980: Matchens hjälte
- 1980: Inga Eliasson, affärsbiträde
- 1981: IFK Trumslagaren och Jack
- 1982: Mitt livs äventyr
- 1982: Benny, boxaren
- 1982: Hela gänget
- 1983: Torsten och Greta
- 1984: Benny Boxaren och kärleken
- 1985: Max Lundgrens Åshöjdens BK
- 1986: Samlade diktförsök
- 1987: Djävulens kontrakt
- 1987: Benny Boxaren nere för räkning
- 1988: Töser!
- 1988: På äventyr med Gula hissen
- 1989: BK Framåt
- 1990: Roseli, älskade Rosa
- 1990: Kåsebergaskräcken
- 1991: En kort tid av lycka
- 1991: Benny Boxaren i Amerika
- 1992: Åshöjdens BK
- 1992: Drömmen om Mallorca och andra berättelser
- 1994: Eriksfält leder med 1-0
- 1996: 21 nästan sanna berättelser
- 1997: Råttan
- 1997: Benny, mästaren
- 1999: Dubbelspel
- 2003: Lina, Gulan och kärleken
- 2004: De magiska handskarna

== Awards ==
- 1967: Expressens Heffaklump
- 1968: Nils Holgersson Plaque
- 1983: 91:an-stipendiet
- 1987: ABF:s litteraturpris
- 1991: Astrid Lindgren-priset
