= Barbro Lindgren =

Swedish children's writer (born 1937)

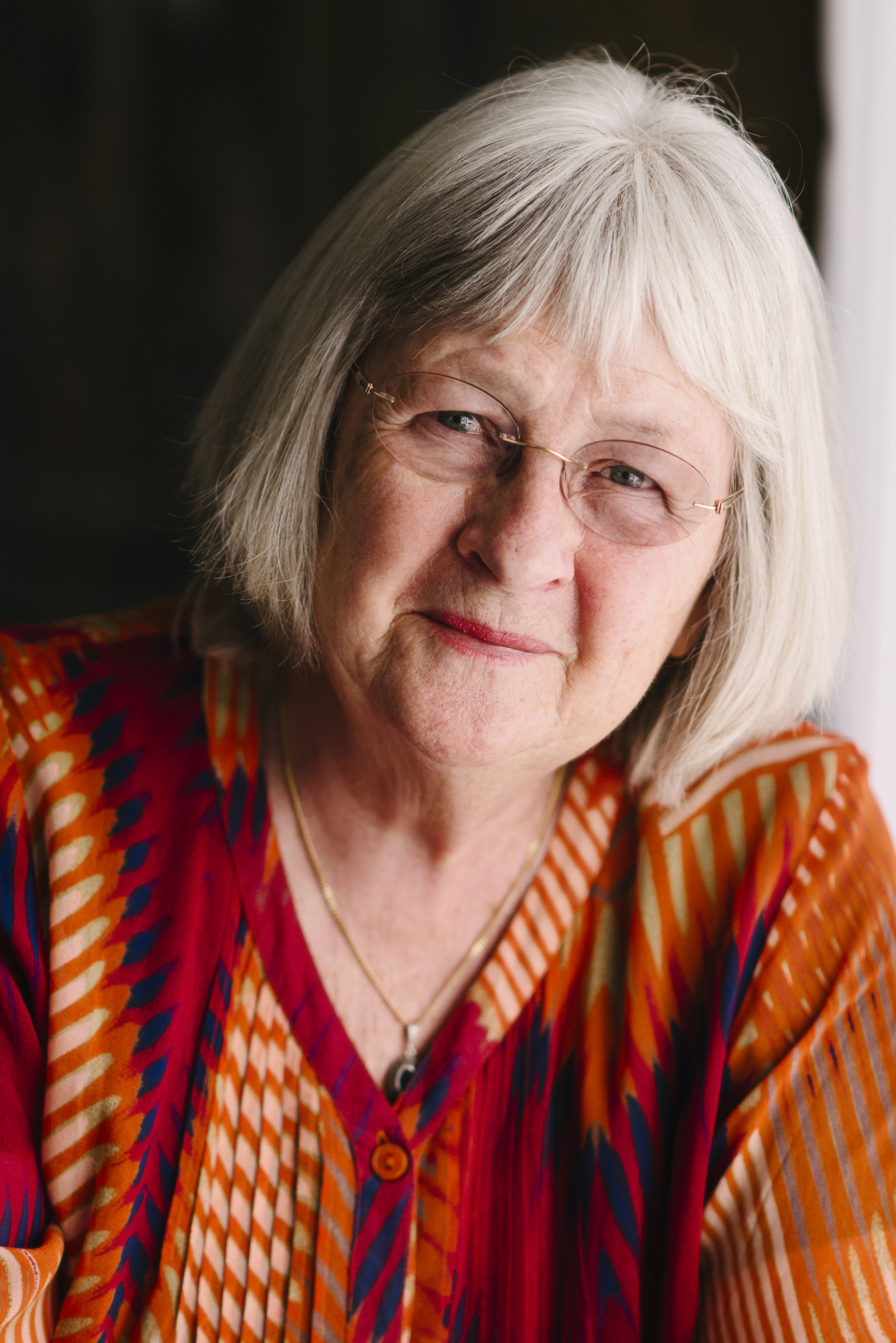
- Born: Barbro Enskog; 18 March 1937 (age 89); Bromma, Sweden
- Occupation: Writer
- Writing career
- Period: 1965–present
- Genres: Children's fiction, picture books
- Notable works: The Wild Baby, Max

Barbro Lindgren (born 18 March 1937) is a Swedish writer of children's literature and books for adult readers. For her lasting contribution as a children's writer, Lindgren was a finalist for the biennial, international Hans Christian Andersen Award in 2004. Ten years later, she won the annual Astrid Lindgren Memorial Award. The biggest cash prize in children's and young-adult literature, it rewards a writer, illustrator, oral storyteller, or reading promoter for its entire body of work.

== Life ==
Barbro Enskog was born in Bromma, Stockholm. She graduated from art school in 1958 and has been writing books for publication since 1965. Her style has exerted a major influence on Swedish children's literature. Located between realism and surrealism, her works are humorous and imaginative, and her books for children treat important issues to be taken seriously and treated for children.

Lindgren won the 1973 Astrid Lindgren Prize, an annual Swedish literary award distinct from the Astrid Lindgren Memorial Award. The once-in-a-lifetime award established on Astrid Lindgren's 60th birthday honours good writing for children or youth. Barbro Lindgren's long-time collaborator, the illustrator Eva Eriksson (born 1949), won the prize in 2001.

== Awards ==
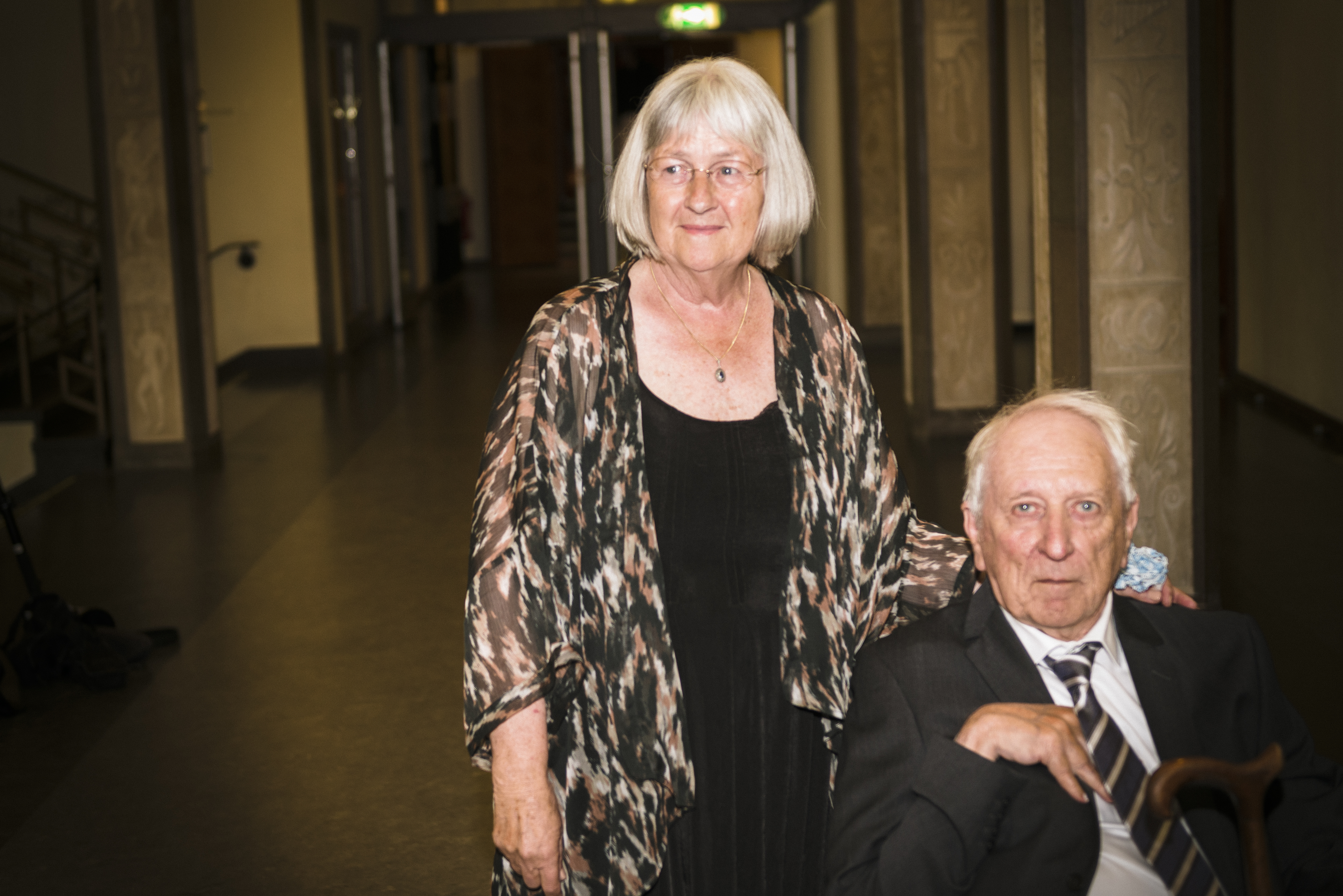
With Tomas Tranströmer for her 2014 Astrid Lindgren Memorial Award

- Grammis for Goda' Goda', 1970
- Expressens Heffaklump, 1971
- Astrid Lindgren Prize, 1973
- Nils Holgersson Plaque for Lilla sparvel, 1977
- Samfundet De Nio's Astrid Lindgren Prize, 2004
- Illis quorum, 2009
- Astrid Lindgren Memorial Award, 2014
- H. M. The King's Medal, 2020

== Selected books ==
- 1965 - Mattias sommar (English: Mattias' Summer), self-illustrated, her first published book
- 1966 - Mera om Mattias
- 1967 - Hej hej Mattias
- 1967 - Genom ventilerna
- 1968 - I Västan Grind
- 1969 - Loranga, Masarin och Dartanjang, self-illustrated
- 1970 - Felipe
- 1970 - Loranga. Loranga
- 1970 - Nu har Kalle fått en lillasyster
- 1971 - Goda' Goda'
- 1971 - Nu är vi gorillor låssas vi
- 1971 - Jättehemligt (English: Big Secret), first of an "autobiographical series of books in diary form"
- 1972 - Världshemligt (English: Top Secret), sequel to Jättehemligt
- 1972 - Alban
- 1972 - Eldvin
- 1973 - Bladen brinner (English: Pages on Fire), sequel to Jättehemligt
- 1974 - Gröngölingen är på väg
- 1975 - Molnens bröder
- 1975 - Barbros pjäser för barn och andra
- 1976 - Rapport från marken
- 1976 - Lilla sparvel
- 1976 - Vad tycker du?
- 1977 - Stora sparvel
- 1978 - Garderobsbio
- 1978 - Hemliga lådans hemligheter
- 1978 - Kom ner från trädet
- 1978 - Världens längsta korv
- 1978 - Var är mina byxor
- 1978 - Jag har en tam myra
- 1979 - Bara Sparvel
- 1979 - Det riktiga havet
- 1979 - Sagan om den lilla farbrorn (English: The Story of the Little Old Man), illustrated by Eva Eriksson (Note: According to ALMA, Lindgren as writer and illustrator Eva Eriksson began "a long-lived co-operation" with Sagan om den lilla farbrorn, published in 1979, and then with their series of picture books called Max.)
- 1980 - Nils Pantaloni Penell
- 1980 - Mamman och den vilda bebin (English: The Wild Baby, 1981), illustrated by Eva Eriksson
- 1981 - Max nalle, picture book, illustrated by Eva Eriksson, first in the little Max series or Sam series (Note: Apparently Max is Sam in English translation. "Titta Max / Look here's Sam". Projects: Feature Films. B Reel (b-reel.com). "Sam's Cookie (Sam / Max)". Goodreads (goodreads.com). Quote: "Published August 1st 1982 by HarperFestival (first published 1981)".)
- 1981 - Max bil
- 1981 - Max kaka
- 1982 - Pompe badar i en å
- 1982 - Pompe går i skogen, illustrated by Eva Eriksson
- 1982 - En liten cyklist
- 1982 - Max lampa
- 1982 - Max balja
- 1982 - Max boll
- 1982 - Den vilda bebiresan (English: The Wild Baby's Boat Trip, 1983)
- 1983 - Pompe tar en promenad
- 1983 - OBS! Viktigt
- 1984 - Prinsessan på ärten
- 1984 - Den fula ankungen
- 1985 - Sakta, sakta ... men ändå framåt
- 1985 - Sagan om Karlknut
- 1985 - Hunden med rocken
- 1985 - Vilda bebin får en hund (English: The Wild Baby's Dog, 1986)
- 1986 - Vitkind
- 1986 - Max potta
- 1986 - Max dockvagn
- 1987 - Vems lilla mössa flyger? (English: Whose Little Hat is Flying?), chapter book
- 1987 - Pellerell
- 1988 - Nu är du mitt barn
- 1988 - Hemligheter
- 1989 - Sunkan flyger, with Olof Landström
- 1990 - Den vilda bebiresan
- 1990 - Korken flyger (English: The Cork is Flying), chapter book
- 1990 - Stackars Allan
- 1991 - Titta Max grav!
- 1991 - Pojken och stjärnan, with Anna-Clara Tidholm
- 1992 - Bra Börje
- 1992 - Boken om Sparvel
- 1992 - Restaurangen är stängd
- 1992 - Stora syster, Lille bror
- 1993 - Jag säger bara Elitchoklad
- 1993 - Puss puss sant sant
- 1994 - Max blöja
- 1994 - Max napp
- 1994 - Här är det lilla huset
- 1995 - Svempa vill ha många nappar
- 1995 - Lilla lokomotivet Rosa
- 1995 - Kungsholmen ros
- 1996 - Rosa flyttar till stan
- 1997 - Rosa på bal
- 1997 - Nu är vi gorillor låssas vi
- 1997 - Nu är vi jobbarkaniner
- 1997 - Andrejs längtan
- 1997 - Mössan och korken flyger
- 1998 - Per och Pompe
- 1998 - Nämen Benny
- 1999 - Prinsessan Rosa
- 1999 - Rosa på dagis
- 2000 - Vi leker att du är en humla
- 2001 - Jamen Benny
- 2004 - Boken om Benny
- 2006 - Vad lever man för (English: What-Are-We-Living-For), chapter book
- 2007 - Nöff nöff Benny
- 2009 - Om sorgen och den lilla glädjen
- 2011 - Ingenting hände, två gånger
- 2013 - Ett nollsummespel
- 2016 - Om fällor och flockdjur

=== Books in English ===
- 2015 – Max's Bath, Gecko Press, ISBN 9781776570003
- 2015 – Max's Bear, Gecko Press, ISBN 9781776570027
- 2015 – Max's Wagon, Gecko Press, ISBN 9781776570010
- 2017 – Soda Pop, Gecko Press, ISBN 9781776570119
