= Trälen =

Swedish reality TV show

Coordinates: 57°49′37.28″N 11°42′18.89″E

Trälen was a reality show on Swedish TV4 and was broadcast in the autumn of 2006. The show, where people from different social classes and parts of Sweden lived together on an island for 40 days, didn't meet the expected success and received low ratings. There were initially twelve participants and every time a bell rang they decided which one of them who was next to leave.

The show was filmed on the small island Trälen in the archipelago of Gothenburg. Another season of the show is not planned. Instead a housing development is planned for the area. The winner of Trälen was Serhan Erdal, who won 500,000 SEK (about USD 70,000).
