= Xerxes (TV series) =

1988 Swedish TV series

- Genre: Comedy; Drama
- Directed by: Peter Schildt
- Country of origin: Sweden
- Original language: Swedish
- No. of seasons: 1
- No. of episodes: 6

Original release
- Network: Kanal 1
- Release: 21 October – 27 November 1988

Xerxes is a comedy TV series based in Sweden, about the adventures of three young men. It originally aired over Kanal 1 from 21 October to 27 November 1988. It was also broadcast in the UK on Channel 4.

== Cast ==
- Benny Haag - Xerxes
- Joakim Borjlind - Tony
- Kalle Westerdahl - Pekka
- Gunilla Larsson - Annsofi
- Thomas Roos - Tommy
- Sara Brandt - Monika
- Yvonne Lombard - Dagmar
- Marianne Stjernqvist - Hjördis
- Helge Skoog - Lundin
- Jan Blomberg - Winstedt
- Johanna Friberg - Nina
- Ulla Skoog - Eva
- Charlott Strandberg - Sussi
- Claire Wikholm - Carina
- Suzanne Reuter - Yvonne
- Camilla Malmquist - Jenny
- Denise Lopez - Linda
