= Älskade Lotten =

Television series

- Genre: Sitcom
- Starring: Charlott Strandberg; Kjell Bergqvist; Sissela Kyle; Jan Holmquist
- Theme music composer: Lars "Lim" Moberg
- Country of origin: Sweden
- Original language: Swedish
- No. of seasons: 2
- No. of episodes: 26

Production
- Producers: Mats Fennvik; MTV Produktion
- Running time: 30 minutes

Original release
- Network: TV3
- Release: 1996 – 1998

Related
- I Love Lucy

Älskade Lotten is a Swedish comedy television series based on the American sitcom I Love Lucy. It was first broadcast in 1996 and ran for two seasons. The twenty-six 30-minute episodes were produced by MTV Produktion and broadcast by TV3.

== Premise ==
Married couple Peter and Lotten Elmfors have recently moved into a terraced house in Gävle, after Lotten lost her job in the tourism industry. They frequently meet up with neighbours Sven and Bibbi Axelsson, which often leads to turmoil. Bets, lies and quarrels are a commonplace occurrence. Neither couple has any children.

== Cast ==
=== Main ===
- Charlott Strandberg as Lotten Elmfors, Peter's wife who is currently unemployed. She is secretly hoping for a career at the local television station GTV, where Peter works and is often the source of turmoil.
- Kjell Bergqvist as Peter Elmfors, Lotten's husband and a colleague of Sven's who works as a presenter at GTV.
- Sissela Kyle as Bibbi Axelsson, Sven's wife and Lotten's best friend and confidante who works part-time in a school cafeteria.
- Jan Holmquist as Sven Axelsson, Bibbi's husband and a colleague of Peter's who works as a floor manager at GTV. He helped Peter with employment.
