= Benny Haag =

Swedish actor

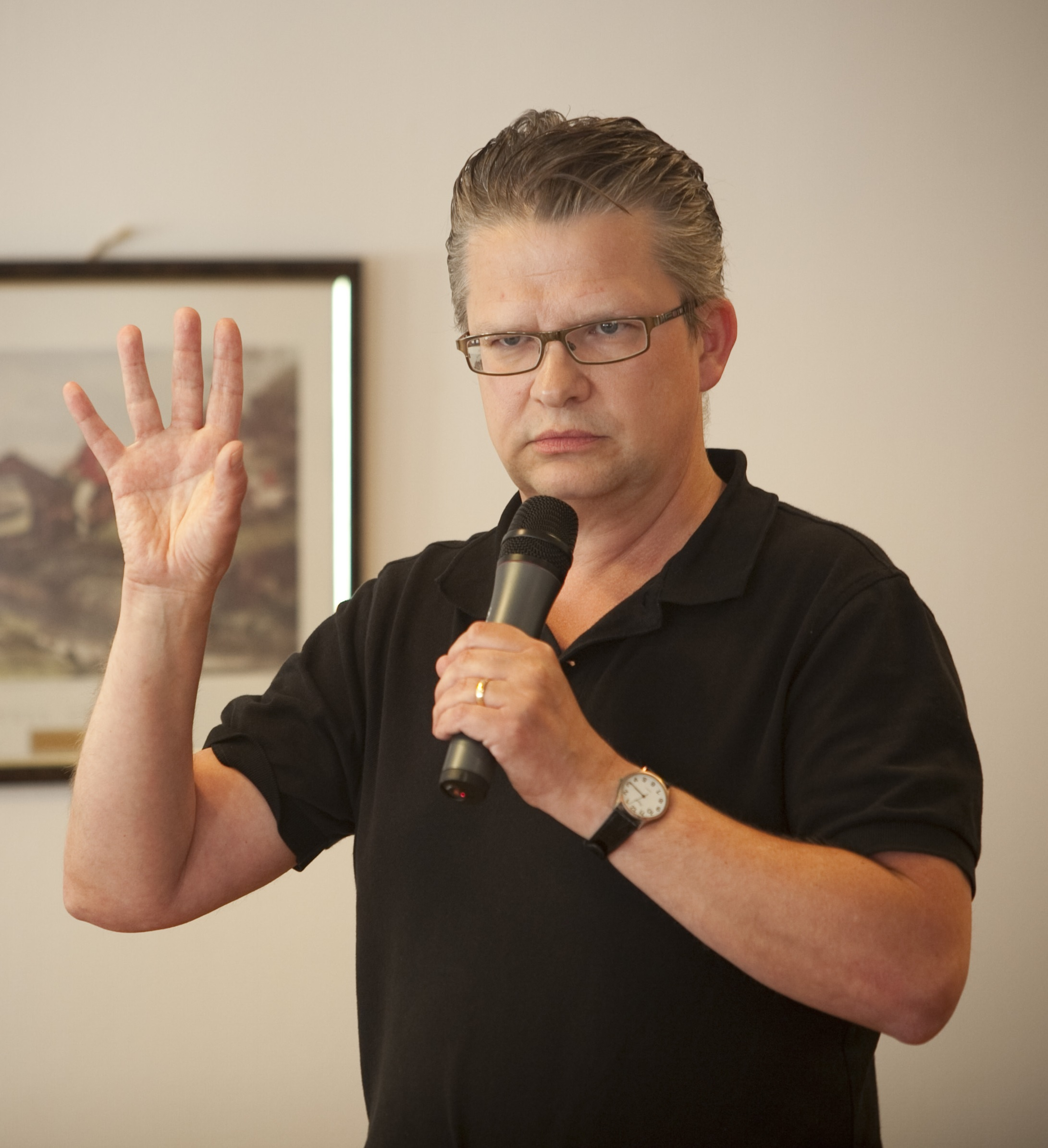
- Born: 8 May 1961 (age 65)
- Occupation: Actor

Benny Haag (born 8 May 1961) is a Swedish actor and former party leader of Spritpartiet (Liquor Party) which ran in the 2010 Swedish general election on 19 September.

== Filmography ==
- Lycka till
- Xerxes (TV Series)
- Vargens tid
- Längtans blåa blomma
- Jakten på en mördare
- Kenny Starfighter
- Öbergs på Lillöga
- Den utvalde
- Allt flyter
