= Mimmi Paulsson-Febo =

Swedish footballer

Personal information
- Date of birth: 1 June 1994 (age 32)
- Place of birth: Sweden
- Position: Goalkeeper

Senior career*
Years	Team	Apps	(Gls)
2014	IK Sirius	14	(0)
2014–2017	KIF Orebro	2	(0)
2017	Västerås BK30	10	(0)
2018–2020	KIF Orebro	46	(0)
2021	Eskilstuna United DFF	0	(0)
- * Club domestic league appearances and goals as of 08:29, 21 May 2016 (UTC)

Mimmi Paulsson-Febo (born 1 June 1994) is a Swedish football goalkeeper.

== Honours ==
KIF Örebro DFF

Runner-up

- Damallsvenskan: 2014
