= Mimmi (book series) =

Children's book series by Viveca Sundvall

Mimmi series
- Author: Viveca Lärn
- Original title: Mimmiserien
- Illustrator: Eva Eriksson
- Cover artist: Eva Eriksson
- Country: Sweden
- Language: Swedish
- Genre: Children's literature
- Published: 1979–1996
- No. of books: 12
- Followed by: Eddie

The Mimmi series (Swedish: Mimmiserien) is a children's book series written by Viveca Lärn (earlier Viveca Sundvall). The main character is Mimmi, a girl in late Kindergarten, later early primary school, age. The books are told from her perspective, many of them as diaries. The books were originally published between 1979 and 1996.

Mimmi lives with her family in Kungälv. Her father Oskar is a postman while her mother Elin is a waitress at restaurant "Gyllene Svanen".

Two television series based on the books have been produced: En ettas dagbok from 1985 and Mimmi from 1988.

== Books ==
Title	Year of publication
Monstret i skåpet	1979
En ettas dagbok	1982
Roberta Karlsson och kungen	1983
Vi smyger på Enok	1985
Mimmi och kalla handen	1985
Vingmuttern, min allra bästa vän	1986
Mimmis bok	1986
Mimi and the Biscuit Factory (Mimmi och kexfabriken)	1988
Miljonären Mårtenson	1989
Mimi Gets a Grandpa (Mimmi får en farfar)	1990
Mera Mimmi	1994
Mimmi och Anders	1996
