= Pojken med guldbyxorna =

1975 Swedish television show

- Genre: children
- Country of origin: Sweden
- Original language: Swedish
- No. of seasons: 1
- No. of episodes: 6

Original release
- Network: SVT
- Release: 9 November 1975

Pojken med guldbyxorna ("The Boy with the Golden Trousers") is a 1975 Swedish TV series, based on a 1967 novel of the same name by Max Lundgren, that became very popular in Sweden and has since been shown numerous times on Swedish television. The version now broadcast on TV4 Guld consists of 30-minute episodes of the series.

The plot revolves around a boy who discovers that he is able to pull an infinite number of banknotes from the pockets of his jeans.

According to the Swedish Film Database, the plot goes as follows: We follow the boy Mats and his adventures with his father after Mats one day finds a pair of trousers in the attic that bring them unimaginable riches. Mats just needs to slip his hand into his pocket and then he can pull out small denomination bills for as long as he is able to keep going.

Initially, they both satisfy only their own personal desires with the money, but gradually Mats' intellect and idealism gains the upper hand and the two together start the firm Nilsson International to utilize the money for good. The biggest problem in the beginning is how to be able to exchange all their small bills into larger denominations without drawing attention. Gradually, it becomes clear that the money is mysteriously connected to money that disappears from bank vaults and cash transports. Soon, newspapers and radio news feature stories about the authorities' efforts to reveal the "man without fingerprints."

Mats and his father, Torkel, then establish the "Fund for Orphaned Children" and fly to a developing country in Africa to donate large amounts of money there. However, the recipients do not always react the way the two had intended.

Mats and his father are hunted and eventually tracked down by financiers who want to stop the uncontrolled outflow of money. After an alcohol-fuelled evening, the father lets the truth slip to a German journalist, and Mats is finally caught by three hired villains who force him to give up his golden trousers, who then burn them. There the story ends for now, with the desperate Mats shouting that they can expect that there will be more boys with golden trousers.
