= Skilda världar =

Swedish television series

- Country of origin: Sweden
- Original language: Swedish
- No. of seasons: 6

Production
- Running time: 22 min (1996–99); 44 min (1999–2002)

Original release
- Network: TV4
- Release: 23 September 1996 – 1 May 2002

Skilda världar (Worlds Apart) is a Swedish soap opera originally airing from 1996 to 2002 about two families in Stockholm and their friends. One of the two families is rich and the other poor and Daniel and Sandra from the two families fall in love. Later in the series it is discovered that Daniel and Sandra are twins. The series goes further and further away from their story and goes more towards the hate from all characters against Rebecka who is trying to destroy the relationship between Sandra and Daniel.

Skilda världar is one of TV4's most watched shows in history and was the longest running daily soap opera in Swedish television. The series was based on the 1980s Australian soap opera, Sons and Daughters.

== Main cast ==
- Lars-Erik Berenett as Harald Bovallius (1996–98)
- Hampus Björck as Mikael Toivonen (1996–2002)
- Matti Berenett as Tom Bovallius (1996–2002)
- Bengt Dahlqvist as Daniel Toivonen (1996–2002)
- Pia Oscarsson as Karin Toivonen (1996–2002)
- Tuva Novotny as Nora Strandberg (1996–99)
- Gunnar Mosén as Matti Toivonen (1996–99)
