= Eva Eriksson (illustrator) =

Swedish illustrator and writer

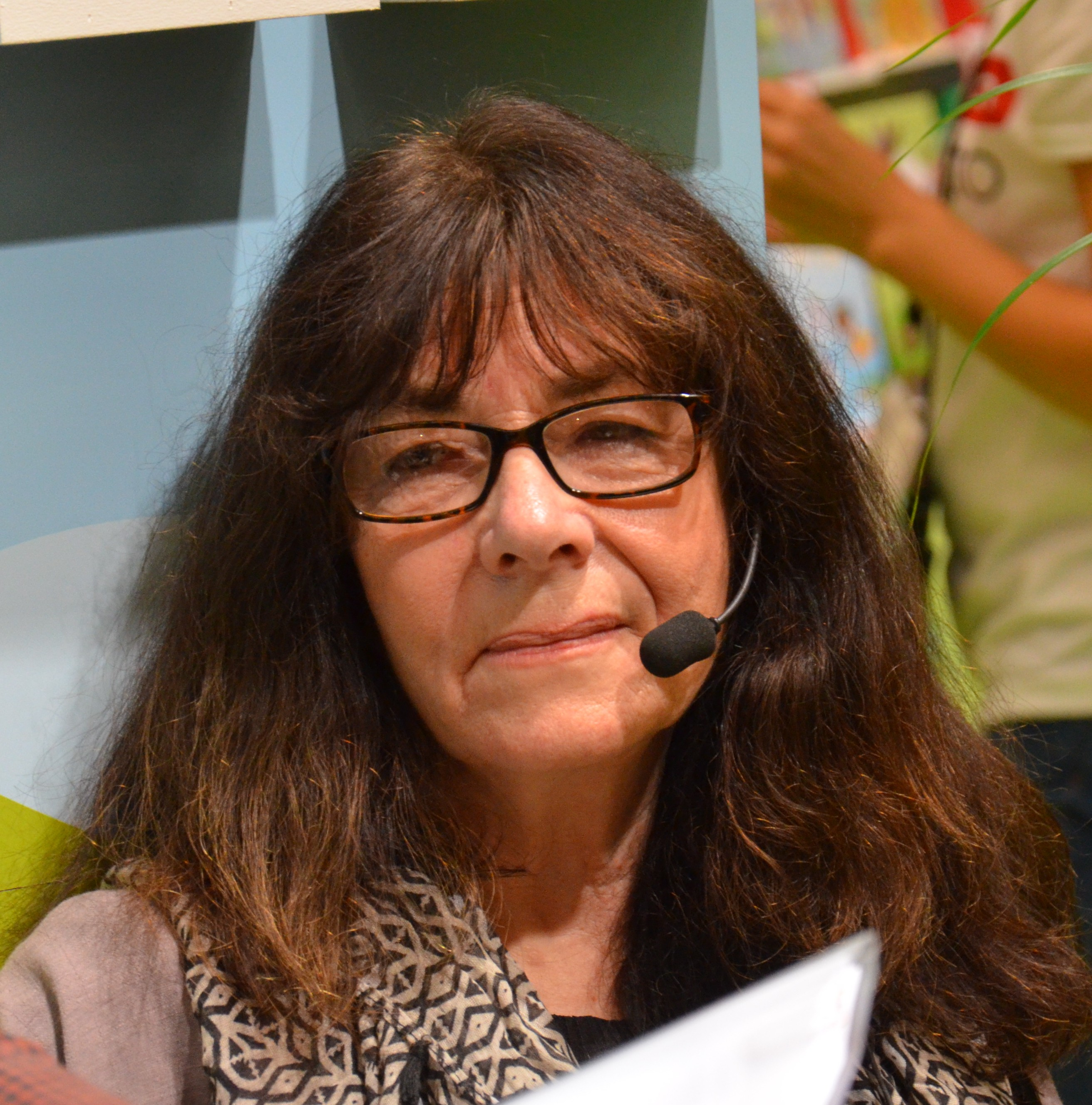
- Eriksson at the 2012 Gothenburg Book Fair
- Born: 13 May 1949 (age 76); Halmstad, Sweden
- Notable work: The Wild Baby; Max; Mimmi; Eddie

Eva Eriksson, born on 13 May 1949 in Halmstad, Sweden, is a Swedish illustrator and writer. She has illustrated several children's books by writers including Barbro Lindgren and Viveca Lärn. Some of her illustrated books have also been translated into the English language by Gecko Press and other publishers.

She studied at Konstfack in Stockholm. Between 2003-2012 she held seat number 1 of the Swedish Academy for Children's Books.

== Select bibliography ==
- 2006: All the Dear Little Animals, written by Ulf Nilsson 32pp., ISBN 978-0-9582598-8-0
- 2009: When We Were Alone in the World, written by Ulf Nilsson, 32pp., ISBN 978-1-877467-35-6
- 2014: My Heart is Laughing, written by Rose Lagercrantz, 120pp., ISBN 9781927271216
- 2015: When I Am Happiest, written by Rose Lagercrantz, 128pp., ISBN 978-1-927271-89-6
- 2015: When Dad Showed Me the Universe, written by Ulf Stark. 32pp., ISBN 978-1-927271-81-0
- 2016: The Midsummer Tomte and the Little Rabbits, written by Ulf Stark. 120pp., ISBN 978-178250-244-9
- 2016: The Yule Tomte and the Little Rabbits, written by Ulf Stark. 104pp., ISBN 978-178250-136-7
- 2017: Little Sister Rabbit and the Fox, written by Ulf Nilsson. 32pp., ISBN 978-178250-378-1
- 2017: Little Sister Rabbit Gets Lost, written by Ulf Nilsson. 32pp., ISBN 978-178250-377-4

== Awards ==
- 1981: Elsa Beskow plaque
- 1981: Expressens Heffaklump
- 1983: BMF Children's plaque (together with Ulf Nilsson) for Little Sister Rabbit
- 1985: BMF Children's plaque (together with Viveca Lärn) for We sneak in Enoch
- 1986: Rabén & Sjögren sign's scholarship
- 1998: BMF Children's plaque for Malla's
- 1999: Knut V Pettersson - stipendiat
- 2001: Astrid Lindgren Prize
- 2006: Ottilia Adelborg Prize
- 2008: Emil Prize
