= Viveca Lärn =

Swedish writer and journalist

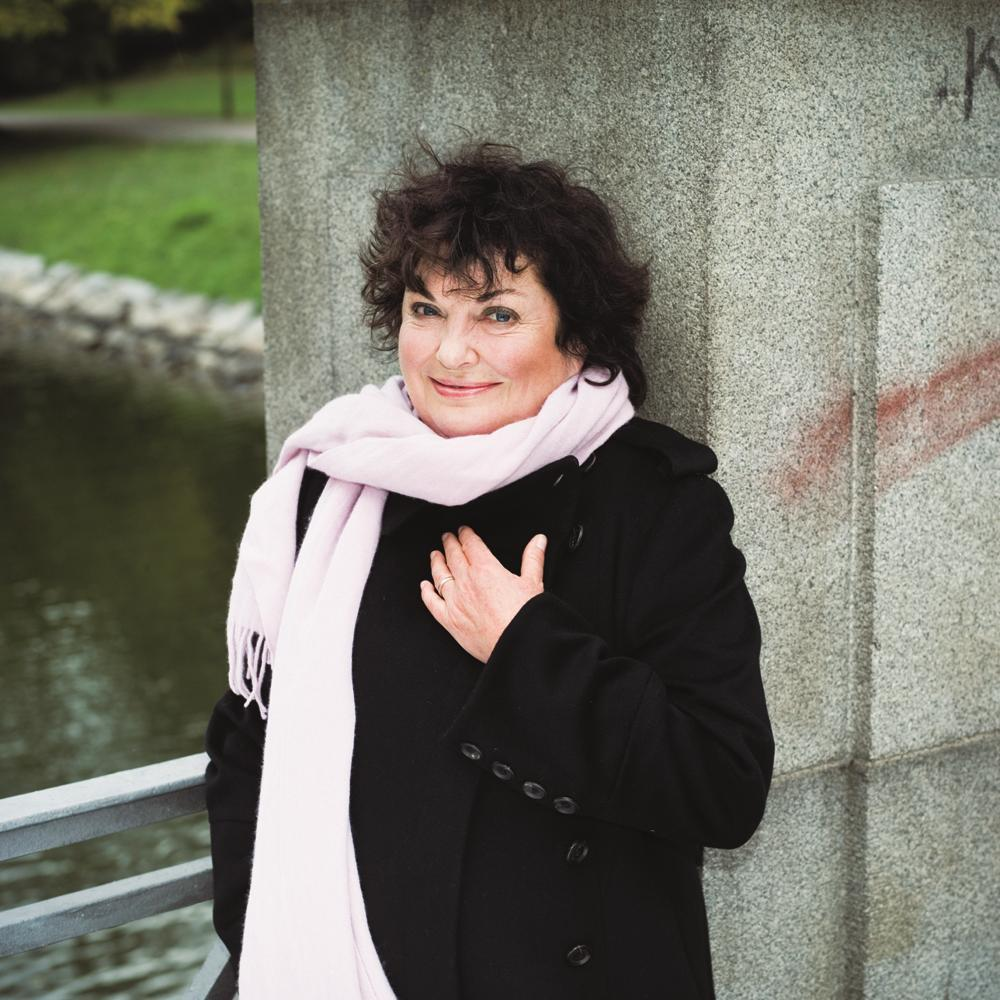
- Viveca Lärn
- Born: 6 April 1944 (age 82); Gothenburg, Sweden
- Writing career
- Period: 1975 -
- Genre: Children's literature
- Notable works: Mimmi, Eddie

Viveca Lärn, earlier Viveca Sundvall (born 6 April 1944), is a Swedish writer and journalist. She is mostly famous for writing the Mimmi and the Eddie children's book series. She has also written books for an adult audience, and many of those books formed the basis for the TV series Saltön.

== Biography ==
=== Childhood and upbringing ===
Viveca Lärn is the daughter of Hubert Lärn, who was a journalist and cartoonist, and Katarina, born Ekstrand, as well as niece to Ferdinand Lärn. In the autobiographical book Sladdisen, a book about my childhood, she depicts her growing up in Gothenburg with the summer holidays at Tjörn. The parents were artistically educated, and the home was characterized by "fantasy, art, literature and popular science walks". She learned early to read and write. Her parents, rather, experienced as her friends than as authorities. In front of games and children's party, she preferred to stay at the creek near the home and fantasize for herself.

When she began at school, Viveca Lärn had to skip first class. She never enjoyed the primary school or the girls' school but received good grades except in the essay writing, when her essays were considered to contain "too much imagination". She enjoyed the youth gang that gathered at Götaplatsen and visited the popular dance clubs. She was given her first writer's assignment as a twelve-year-old when the uncle at the Gothenburg-Tidningen needed a translator to the series' text boxes. An aunt and her husband became deputy parents when she returned to Gothenburg after the family's move to San Francisco. Early on, she was set to become a writer and during high school, Lärn won an essay competition with a Frankrikesa as the first prize.

== Awards ==
- Astrid Lindgren Prize 1985
- BMF-plaketten 1985 – för Vi smyger på Enok
- Wettergrens barnbokollon 1991
- Expressens Heffaklump 1992
- Nils Holgersson Plaque 1992 for Eddie och Maxon Jaxon
- Partille Bokhandels författarstipendium 1994
- Årets göteborgare 1998
- Bokjuryn (kategori 7-9 år) 2000
- SKTFs pris-årets forfatter 2004
- Tage Danielsson Prize 2004
