= Deutscher Jugendliteraturpreis =

Annual German children's literary award

- Awarded for: Outstanding children's literature
- Country: Germany
- Presented by: Federal Ministry for Education, Family Affairs, Senior Citizens, Women and Youth
- First award: 1956

The Deutscher Jugendliteraturpreis (German Children’s Literature Award ) is an annual award established in 1956 by the Federal Ministry for Education, Family Affairs, Senior Citizens, Women and Youth to recognise outstanding works of children's and young adult literature. It is Germany's only state-funded literary award. In the past, authors from many countries have been recognised, including non-German speakers.

== Organisation ==
The award is organized by the Dachverband Jugendliteratur, also called DJL or German Children’s Literature Association, which receives financial support, including prize money, from the Federal Ministry for Education, Family Affairs, Senior Citizens, Women and Youth.

Awards are given in five categories: Best Picture Book, Best Children's Book, Best Young Adult Book, Best Non-Fiction Book and the Young Adult Jury Award. Up to six nominations in each category are announced in March at the Leipzig Book Fair, and the awards are presented during the Frankfurt Book Fair by the Federal Minister for Education, Family Affairs, Senior Citizens, Women and Youth. In each category, the winning author receives a 10,000 euro cash prize, and a bronze statuette designed by Detlef Kraft representing Momo from the novel by Michael Ende.

Furthermore, two special awards are presented alternately to German authors, illustrators or translators. The Special Award for Lifetime Achievements is set at 12,000 Euro. The Special Award for New Talents carries a value of 10,000 Euro. Both are also financed by the Federal Ministry.

== History ==
Since the award was established, many changes have been made. When the Deutscher Jugendbuchpreis (as the award was known until 1981) began in 1956, only two categories were recognised; Best Children's Book and Best Youth Book. In addition to these, a special prize was awarded every year in a different category. It was not until 1964 that the Best Picture Book and Best Non-fiction Book categories replaced this variable award. The final category recognized today, awarded by the Young Adult Jury, was not introduced until 2003, when it was originally called the Young People's Prize (Preis der Jugendlichen). In 1991, to celebrate the 35th anniversary of the award, the special award for lifetime achievement was reintroduced to recognise individual achievement for writers, illustrators and translators. In 2017 it was supplemented by the special award for new talents to celebrate the 60th anniversary of the award.

== Jury ==
Awards are decided upon by three juries: the Jury of Critics (Kritikerjury), the Young Adult Jury (Jugendjury) and the Special Award Jury (Sonderpreisjury). The Jury of Critics decides the nominations and the majority of the prizes; the Young Adult Jury only decides nominations and winners of the Young Adult Jury Award. The Special Award Jury awards two special awards — for lifetime achievements and for a newcomer ("New Talent") — in the areas of text, illustration or translation (in yearly rotation).

The Jury of Critics is appointed by the German Children’s Literature Association once every two years, although jury members can serve two consecutive terms. The jury consists of nine members: the chair, and eight specialist judges – two for each award category.

The Young Adult Jury consists of the members of six German youth book clubs. It is also changed every two years, although some clubs serve consecutive terms.

The Special Award Jury consists of three members and changes every year.

== Awards ==
=== 2020–2026 ===
2026 Prize winners
Book Title	Author	Illustrator	Translator	Source Country	Award Category
Hier kommt ein T-Rex vor: Und das ist erst der Anfang	Julie Douine	Noémie Favart	Anja Kootz	France	Picture book
Keine Party ist auch keine Lösung	Anna Maria Praßler	Theresa Strozyk		Germany	Children's book
Das falsche Leben	Maja Nielsen			Germany	YA book
Schweigen	Birgit Weyhe			Germany	Non-fiction
Badjens	Delphine Minoui		Astrid Bührle-Gallet	France / Iran	Youth jury
Und mir bleibt der hässliche Hund	Franziska Hörner			Germany	New talent (Author)
	Jutta Richter			Germany	Lifetime Achievements (Author)

2025 Prize winners
Book Title	Author	Illustrator	Translator	Source Country	Award Category
Regentag	Jens Rassmus			Germany	Picture book
Himmelwärts	Karen Köhler	Bea Davies		Germany	Children's book
Und die Welt, sie fliegt hoch	Sarah Jäger	Sarah Maus		Germany	YA book
Läuse. Handbuch zum Überleben auf Menschen (Span. orig.: Manual de supervivencia para piojos)	Berta Páramo	Berta Páramo	Stefanie Kuballa-Cottone	Spain	Non-fiction
No Alternative	Dirk Reinhardt	Dirk Reinhardt		Germany	Youth jury
Ahmadjan und der Wiedehopf	Maren Amini (mit Ahmadjan Amini)	Maren Amini		Germany	New talent (Illustrator)
	Antje Damm			Germany	Lifetime Achievements (Illustrator)

2024 Prize winners
Book Title	Author	Illustrator	Translator	Source Country	Award Category
Wünsche (Engl. orig.: Wishes)	Mượn Thị Văn	Victo Ngai	Petra Steuber	USA	Picture book
Wolf	Saša Stanišić	Regina Kehn		Germany	Children's book
Kurz vor dem Rand	Eva Rottmann			Germany	YA book
Games. Auf den Spuren der Flüchtenden aus Afghanistan	Patrick Oberholzer			Switzerland	Non-fiction
Durch das große Feuer (orig.: In Memoriam)	Alice Winn		Ursula Wulfekamp and Benjamin Wildner	USA	Youth jury
Möge der Tigris um dich weinen	Astrid Bührle-Gallet			Germany	New talent (Translator)
	Rolf Erdorf			Germany	Lifetime Achievements (Translator)

2023 Prize winners
Book Title	Author	Illustrator	Translator	Source Country	Award Category
Spinne spielt Klavier	Benjamin Gottwald	Benjamin Gottwald		Germany	Picture book
Boris, Babette und lauter Skelette	Tanja Esch			Germany	Children's book
Die Sonne, so strahlend und Schwarz	Chantal-Fleur Sandjon			Germany	YA novel
Queergestreift	Kathrin Köller	Irmela Schautz		Germany	Non-fiction
Als die Welt uns gehörte (orig.:When the World was Ours)	Liz Kessler		Eva Riekert	Great Britain	Youth jury
Nordstadt	Annika Büsing			Germany	New talent (Writer)
	Alois Prinz			Germany	Lifetime Achievements (Writer)

2022 Prize winners
Book Title	Author	Illustrator	Translator	Source Country	Award Category
Unsere Grube (orig.:Gropen )	Emma Adbåge	Emma Adbåge	Friederike Buchinger	Sweden	Picture book
Die Suche nach Paulie Fink (orig.:The Next Great Paulie Fink)	Ali Benjamin		Jessika Komina, Sandra Knuffinke	USA	Children's book
Dunkelnacht	Kirsten Boie			Germany	YA novel
Der Duft der Kiefern – Meine Familie und ihre Geheimnisse	Bianca Schaalburg			Germany	Non-fiction
Hard Land	Benedict Wells			Switzerland	Youth jury
Anna		Mia Oberländer		Germany	New talent (Illustrator)
		Hans Ticha		Germany	Lifetime Achievements (Illustrator)

2021 Prize winners
Book Title	Author	Illustrator	Translator	Source Country	Award Category
Unsichtbar in der großen Stadt (orig.:Small in the city)	Sydney Smith	Sydney Smith	Bernadette Ott	Canada	Picture book
Irgendwo ist immer Süden (orig.: Syden)	Marianne Kaurin		Franziska Hüther	Norway	Children's book
Sibiro Haiku (orig.:Sibiro haiku)	Jurga Vilė	Lina Itagaki	Saskia Drude	Lithuania	YA novel
100 Kinder	Christoph Drösser	Nora Coenenberg		Germany	Non-fiction
After the Fire (orig.: Moonrise)	Will Hill		Wolfram Ströle	Great Britain	Youth jury
Tippo und Fleck. Über Fleckenteufel und andere Kobolde			Lena Dorn	Germany	New talent (Translator)
					Lifetime Achievements: not awarded in 2021

2020 Prize winners
Book Title	Author	Illustrator	Translator	Source Country	Award Category
Dreieck Quadrat Kreis	Mac Barnett	Jon Klassen	Thomas Bodmer	USA	Picture book
Freibad – Ein ganzer Sommer unter dem Himmel	Will Gmehling			Germany	Children's book
Wie der Wahnsinn mir die Welt erklärte	Dita Zipfel	Rán Flygenring		Germany	YA novel
A wie Antarktis – Ansichten vom anderen Ende der Welt (orig.: A jako Antarktida : pohled z druhé strany)	David Böhm	David Böhm	Lena Dorn	Czech Republic	Non-fiction
Wer ist Edward Moon? (engl.: Moonrise)	Sarah Crossan		Cordula Setsman	Ireland	Youth jury
Forschungsgruppe Erbsensuppe oder wie wir Omas großem Geheimnis auf die Spur kamen	Rieke Patwardhan			Germany	New talent (Author)
	Cornelia Funke			Germany	Lifetime achievements (Writer)

=== 2010–2019 ===
2019 Prize winners
Book Title	Author	Illustrator	Translator	Source Country	Award Category
Polka für Igor	Iris Anemone Paul	Iris Anemone Paul		Germany	Picture book
Vier Wünsche ans Universum	Erin Entrada Kelly		Birgitt Kollmann	USA	Children's book
Ich weiß, heute Nacht werde ich träumen	Steven Herrick		Uwe-Michael Gutzschhahn	Australia	YA novel
Extremismus	Anja Reumschüssel			Germany	Non-fiction
Kompass ohne Norden	Neal Shusterman	Brendan Shusterman	Ingo Herzke	USA	Youth jury
Polka für Igor		Iris Anemone Paul		Germany	New talent (Illustration)
		Volker Pfüller		Germany	Lifetime achievements (Illustrator)

2018 Prize winners
Book Title	Author	Illustrator	Translator	Source Country	Award Category
Der siebente Bruder oder Das Herz im Marmeladenglas	Øyvind Torseter	Øyvind Torseter	Maike Dörries	Norway	Picture book
Viele Grüße, Deine Giraffe	Megumi Iwasa	Jörg Mühle	Ursula Gräfe	Japan	Children's book
Als ich mit Hitler Schnapskirschen aß	Manja Präkels			Germany	YA novel
Der Dominoeffekt oder Die unsichtbaren Fäden der Natur	Gianumberto Accinelli	Serena Viola	Ulrike Schimming	Italy	Non-fiction
The Hate U Give	Angie Thomas		Henriette Zeltner	USA	Youth jury
Schreib! Schreib! Schreib	Ylva Karlsson, Katarina Kuick	Sara Lundberg	Gesa Kunter	Sweden	New talent (Translator)
			Uwe-Michael Gutzschhahn	Germany	Lifetime achievements (Translator)

2017

Picture Book
Book Title	Author	Illustrator	Translator	Award
Don't Cross The Line	Isabel Minhós Martins	Bernardo P. Carvalho	Franziska Hauffe	Winner
Kommt das Nashorn	Heinz Janisch	Helga Bansch		Nominee
The Journey	Francesca Sanna	Francesca Sanna	Thomas Bodmer	Nominee
Hieronymus. Ein Abenteuer in der Welt des Hieronymus Bosch	Thé Tjong-Khing	Thé Tjong-Khing		Nominee
Nusret und die Kuh	Anja Tuckermann	Uli Krappen, Mehrdad Zaeri		Nominee
The Bad Guys #1	Aaron Blabey	Aaron Blabey	Lisa Engels	Nominee

Children's Book
Book Title	Author	Illustrator	Translator	Award
The Murderer's Ape	Jakob Wegelius	Jakob Wegelius	Gabriele Haefs	Winner
Brown	Håkon Øvreås	Øyvind Torseter	Angelika Kutsch	Nominee
Der Krokodildieb	Taran Bjørnstad	Christoffer Grav	Maike Dörries	Nominee
Gips oder Wie ich an einem einzigen Tag die Welt reparierte	Anna Woltz		Andrea Kluitmann	Nominee
Pssst!	Annette Herzog	Katrine Clante		Nominee
Krasshüpfer	Simon van der Geest	Karst-Janneke Rogaar	Mirjam Pressler	Nominee

Young Adult Book
Book Title	Author	Translator	Award
The Smell of Other People's Houses	Bonnie-Sue Hitchcock	Sonja Finck	Winner
Vierzehn	Tamara Bach		Nominee
Im Jahr des Affen	Que Du Luu		Nominee
Waiting for Gonzo	Dave Cousins	Anne Brauner	Nominee
One	Sarah Crossan	Cordula Setsman	Nominee
Eisvogelsommer	Jan de Leeuw	Rolf Erdorf	Nominee

Non-fiction Book
Book Title	Author	Illustrator	Translator	Award
The Book of Bees!	Piotr Socha	Piotr Socha	Thomas Weiler	Winner
Lass mich frei!	Patrick George	Patrick George		Nominee
Martha	Atak	Atak		Nominee
Kopf im Kopf	Ondřej Buddeus	David Böhm	Doris Kouba	Nominee
Technik in den Alpen. Von Seilbahnen, Staudämmen und Schneekanonen	Elfi Fritsche, Johanna Putzer, Josef Putzer	Johanna Putzer		Nominee
Iss was?! Tiere Fleisch und ich	Gesine Grotrian (design), Christine Chemnitz (editor), Gabriela Häfner (editor)			Nominee

Young Adult Jury Award
Book Title	Author	Translator	Award
Simon vs. the Homo Sapiens Agenda	Becky Albertalli	Ingo Herzke	Winner
Vierzehn	Tamara Bach		Nominee
The Simple Gift	Steven Herrick	Uwe-Michael Gutzschhahn	Nominee
One	Sarah Crossan	Cordula Setsman	Nominee
Mein bester letzter Sommer	Anne Freytag (Text)		Nominee
Every Last Word	Tamara Ireland Stone	Jessika Komina, Sandra Knuffinke	Nominee

New Talent Award
Book Title	Author	Award
Lizzy Carbon und der Klub der Verlierer	Mario Fesler	Winner
Der Hummelreiter Friedrich Löwenmaul	Verena Reinhardt	Nominee
Es ist gefährlich, bei Sturm zu schwimmen	Ulla Scheler	Nominee

Special award for lifetime achievements: Gudrun Pausewang (author)

2016

Picture Book
Book Title	Author	Illustrator	Translator	Award
The Dog That Nino Didn't Have	Edward van de Vendel	Anton van Hertbruggen	Rolf Erdorf	Winner
Eine Geschichte ohne Ende		Marcelo Pimentel		Nominee
The Bus Ride	Marianne Dubuc	Marianne Dubuc	Julia Süßbrich	Nominee
Das Herz des Affen	Emmanuelle Polack	Barroux	Babette Blume	Nominee
Der goldene Käfig oder Die wahre Geschichte der Blutprinzessin	Anna Castagnoli	Carll Cneut	Ulrike Schimming	Nominee

Children's Book
Book Title	Author	Illustrator	Translator	Award
The Green Bicycle	Hayfa Al Mansour		Catrin Frischer	Winner
Frohe Weihnachten, Zwiebelchen!	Frida Nilsson	Anke Kuhl	Friederike Buchinger	Nominee
Mein Sommer mit Mucks	Stefanie Höfler	Franziska Walther		Nominee
Rain Reign	Ann M. Martin		Gabriele Haefs	Nominee
Alex, the Dog and the Unopenable Door	Ross Montgomery		André Mumot	Nominee

Young Adult Book
Book Title	Author	Illustrator	Translator	Award
Mädchenmeute	Kirsten Fuchs			Winner
Dead Ends	Erin Jade Lange		Jessika Komina, Sandra Knuffinke	Nominee
A Death-Struck Year	Makiia Lucier		Katharina Diestelmeier	Nominee
This One Summer	Mariko Tamaki	Jillian Tamaki	Tina Hohl	Nominee
Eleanor & Park	Rainbow Rowell		Brigitte Jakobeit	Nominee
Das hier ist kein Tagebuch	Erna Sassen		Rolf Erdorf	Nominee

Non-fiction Book
Book Title	Author	Illustrator	Translator	Award
Im Eisland	Kristina Gehrmann			Winner
Abc.de	Iwona Chmielewska	Iwona Chmielewska		Nominee
Shackleton's Journey	William Grill	William Grill	Harald Stadler	Nominee
Alle Wetter	Britta Teckentrup	Britta Teckentrup		Nominee
Leibniz oder die beste der möglichen Welten	Jean Paul Mongin	Julia Wauters	Heinz Jatho	Nominee
Der Traum von Olympia	Reinhard Kleist	Reinhard Kleist		Nominee

Young Adult Jury Award
Book Title	Author	Translator	Award
Sommer unter schwarzen Flügeln	Peer Martin		Winner
Everything, Everything	Nicola Yoon	Simone Wiemken	Nominee
Boy21	Matthew Quick	Knut Krüger	Nominee
Das hier ist kein Tagebuch	Erna Sassen	Rolf Erdorf	Nominee
Never Fall Down	Patricia McCormick	Maren Illinger	Nominee

- Special award for lifetime achievements: Klaus Kordon (author)

2015

Picture Book
Book Title	Author	Illustrator	Translator	Award
Mr. Wuffles!	David Wiesner	David Wiesner	Paula Hagemeier	Winner
Gordon und Tapir	Sebastian Meschenmoser	Sebastian Meschenmoser		Nominee
Ein Apfelbaum im Bauch	Simon Boulerice	Gérard DuBois	Anna von Cramer-Klett	Nominee
Coco and the Little Black Dress	Annemarie van Haeringen	Annemarie van Haeringen	Marianne Holberg	Nominee
Lindbergh: Die abenteuerliche Geschichte einer fliegenden Maus	Torben Kuhlmann	Torben Kuhlmann		Nominee
Rules of Summer	Shaun Tan	Shaun Tan	Eike Schönfeld	Nominee

Children's Book
Book Title	Author	Illustrator	Translator	Award
The Dreamer	Pam Muñoz Ryan	Peter Sís	Anne Braun	Winner
Rosie und Moussa: Der Brief von Papa	Michael De Cock	Judith Vanistendael	Rolf Erdorf	Nominee
My Father the Great Pirate	Davide Calì	Maurizio A.C. Quarello	Edmund Jacoby	Nominee
Lena und das Geheimnis der blauen Hirsche	Edward van de Vendel	Mattias De Leeuw	Rolf Erdorf	Nominee
The Boy Who Swam with Piranhas	David Almond	Oliver Jeffers	Alexandra Ernst	Nominee
Konstantin im Wörterwald	Martin Heckmanns	Stefanie Harjes		Nominee

Young Adult Book
Book Title	Author	Translator	Award
Schneeriese	Susan Kreller		Winner
Every Day	David Levithan	Martina Tichy	Nominee
[Aristotle and Dante Discover the Secrets of the Universe]	Benjamin Alire Sáenz	Brigitte Jakobeit	Nominee
Der Ernst des Lebens macht auch keinen Spaß	Christoph Wortberg		Nominee
Beyond the Blue Border	Dorit Linke		Nominee
Die unterirdische Sonne	Friedrich Ani		Nominee

Non-fiction Book
Book Title	Author	Illustrator	Translator	Award
Und dann platzt der Kopf	Christina Röckl	Christina Röckl		Winner
Kritzl & Klecks: Eine Entdeckungsreise ins Land des Zeichnens & Malens	Verena Ballhaus, Renate Habinger	Verena Ballhaus, Renate Habinger		Nominee
The Pilot and the Little Prince: The Life of Antoine de Saint-Exupéry	Peter Sís	Peter Sís	Brigitte Jakobeit	Nominee
Endres, der Kaufmannssohn: Vom Leben in einer mittelalterlichen Hansestadt	Anke Bär	Anke Bär		Nominee
The Mystery of Life: How Nothing Became Everything	Jan Paul Schutten	Floor Rieder	Verena Kiefer	Nominee
Tagebuch 14/18	Alexander Hogh, Martin Block(editor), Julie Cazier (editor)	Jörg Mailliet		Nominee

Young Adult Jury Award
Book Title	Author	Translator	Award
Every Day	David Levithan	Martina Tichy	Winner
The Circle	Dave Eggers	Klaus Timmermann, Ulrike Wasel	Nominee
The Wall	William Sutcliffe	Christiane Steen	Nominee
If You Find Me	Emily Murdoch	Julia Walther	Nominee
The Paradox of Vertical Flight	Emil Ostrovski	Thomas Gunkel	Nominee
Echt	Christoph Scheuring		Nominee

- Special award for lifetime achievements: Sabine Friedrichson (illustrator)

2014

Picture Book
Book Title	Author	Illustrator	Translator	Award
Akim rennt	Claude K. Dubois	Claude K. Dubois	Tobias Scheffel	Winner
Lines Everywhere	Jimi Lee	Jimi Lee		Nominee
Herman and Rosie	Gus Gordon	Gus Gordon	Gundula Müller-Wallraf	Nominee
Krümel und Pfefferminz: Wilde Tiere	Delphine Bournay	Delphine Bournay	Julia Süßbrich	Nominee
Das literarische Kaleidoskop	Regina Kehn	Regina Kehn		Nominee
The Conference of the Birds	Peter Sís	Peter Sís	Brigitte Jakobeit	Nominee

Children's Book
Book Title	Author	Illustrator	Translator	Award
Königin des Sprungturms	Martina Wildner			Winner
Besuch beim Hasen	Christian Oster	Katja Gehrmann	Tobias Scheffel	Nominee
Der beste Tag aller Zeiten: Weitgereiste Gedichte	Susan Kreller (Editor)	Sabine Wilharm	Henning Ahrens, Claas Kazzer	Nominee
Papa, hörst du mich?	Tamara Bos	Annemarie van Haeringen	Ita Maria Berger	Nominee
Mr. and Mrs. Bunny--Detectives Extraordinaire!	Polly Horvath	Sophie Blackall	Christiane Buchner	Nominee
Leo und das ganze Glück	Synne Lea		Maike Dörries	Nominee

Young Adult Book
Book Title	Author	Translator	Award
Wie ein unsichtbares Band	Inés Garland	Ilse Layer	Winner
The Weight of Water	Sarah Crossan	Cordula Setsman	Nominee
12 Things To Do Before You Crash and Burn	James Proimos	Uwe-Michael Gutzschhahn	Nominee
About a Girl	Joanne Horniman	Brigitte Jakobeit	Nominee
Bo	Rainer Merkel		Nominee
Tiger Milk	Stefanie de Velasco		Nominee

Non-fiction Book
Book Title	Author	Illustrator	Translator	Award
Gerda Gelse: Allgemeine Weisheiten über Stechmücken	Heidi Trpak	Laura Momo Aufderhaar		Winner
The Potato King	Christoph Niemann			Nominee
Die Ton-Angeber	Anna Czerwińska-Rydel	Marta Ignerska	Olaf Kühl	Nominee
Sommerschnee und Wurstmaschine: Sehr moderne Kunst aus aller Welt	Sebastian Cichocki	Aleksandra Mizielińska, Daniel Mizielińsky	Thomas Weiler	Nominee
Fräulein Esthers letzte Vorstellung	Adam Jaromir	Gabriela Cichowska		Nominee
Mein Opa, sein Holzbein und der Große Krieg: Was der Erste Weltkrieg mit uns zu tun hat	Nikolaus Nützel			Nominee

Young Adult Jury Award
Book Title	Author	Illustrator	Translator	Award
Wonder	Raquel J. Palacio	André Mumot		Winner
The Terrible Thing that Happened to Barnaby Brocket	John Boyne	Oliver Jeffers	Adelheid Zöfel	Nominee
2084 - Noras Welt	Jostein Gaarder		Gabriele Haefs	Nominee
Everything	Janne Teller		Sigrid C. Engeler, Birgitt Kollmann	Nominee
The Bone Dragon	Alexia Casale		Henning Ahrens	Nominee
Blank Slate	Boulet	Pénélope Bagieu	Ulrich Pröfrock	Nominee

- Special award for lifetime achievements: Angelika Kutsch (translator)

2013

Picture Book
Book Title	Author	Illustrator	Translator	Award
Wo ist mein Hut	Jon Klassen	Jon Klassen		Winner
Ein Entlein kann so nützlich sein	Isol	Isol	Karl Rühmann	Nominee
Nalle liebt Oma	Stina Wirsén	Stina Wirsén	Maike Dörries	Nominee
Der Tag, an dem Louis gefressen wurde	John Fardell	John Fardell	Bettina Münch	Nominee
Der Rauhe Berg	Einar Turkowski	Einar Turkowski		Nominee
Der Pirat und der Apotheker: Eine lehrreiche Geschichte	Robert Louis Stevenson	Henning Wagenbreth	Henning Wagenbreth	Nominee

Children's Book
Book Title	Author	Illustrator	Translator	Award
Der unvergessene Mantel	Frank Cottrell Boyce	Carl Hunter(Photographer), Clare Heney(Photographer)	Salah Naoura	Winner
Ich wünschte	Toon Tellegen	Ingrid Godon	Birgit Erdmann	Nominee
Tommy Mütze: Eine Erzählung aus Südafrika	Jenny Robson		Barbara Brennwald	Nominee
Die wilden Piroggenpiraten: Ein tollkühnes Abenteuer um eine entführte Mohnschnecke und ihre furchtlosen Retter	Māris Putniņš		Matthias Knoll	Nominee
Zorgamazoo	Robert Paul Weston	Víctor Rivas	Uwe-Michael Gutzschhahn	Nominee
Als mein Vater ein Busch wurde und ich meinen Namen verlor	Joke van Leeuwen		Hanni Ehlers	Nominee

Young Adult Book
Book Title	Author	Translator	Award
Abzählen	Tamta Melaschwili	Natia Mikeladse-Bachsoliani	Winner
You Can't See The Elephants	Susan Kreller		Nominee
Pampa Blues	Rolf Lappert		Nominee
Wer hat Angst vor Jasper Jones?	Craig Silvey	Bettina Münch	Nominee
Meine Schwester ist eine Mönchsrobbe	Christian Frascella	Annette Kopetzki	Nominee

Non-fiction Book
Book Title	Author	Illustrator	Award
The Boxer: The True Story of Holocaust Survivor Harry Haft	Reinhard Kleist	Reinhard Kleist	Winner
Heute bin ich	Mies van Hout	Mies van Hout	Nominee
Planet Willi	Birte Müller	Birte Müller	Nominee
Entdecke, was dir schmeckt: Kinder erobern die Küche	Anke M. Leitzgen	Lisa Rienermann (Illustrator & Photographer), Thekla Ehling (Photographer)	Nominee
Wilhelms Reise: Eine Auswanderergeschichte	Anke Bär	Anke Bär	Nominee
Make Love: Ein Aufklärungsbuch	Ann-Marlene Henning, Tina Bremer-Olszewski	Heji Shin (Photographer)	Nominee

Young Adult Jury Award
Book Title	Author	Illustrator	Translator	Award
The Fault in Our Stars	John Green		Sophie Zeitz	Winner
Jackpot: Wer träumt, verliert	Stephan Knösel			Nominee
Finding Sky: Die Macht der Seelen	Joss Stirling		Michaela Kolodziejcok	Nominee
Allein unter Schildkröten	Marit Kaldhol		Maike Dörries	Nominee
Kriegszeiten: Eine grafische Reportage über Soldaten, Politiker und Opfer in Afghanistan	David Schraven	Vincent Burmeister		Nominee
Adios, Nirvana	Conrad Wesselhoeft		Karsten Singelmann	Nominee

- Special award for lifetime achievements: Andreas Steinhöfel (author)

2012

Picture Book
Book Title	Author	Illustrator	Translator	Award
Mia schläft woanders	Pija Lindenbaum	Pija Lindenbaum	Kerstin Behnken	Winner
Einer mehr	Yvonne Hergane	Christiane Pieper		Nominee
999 Froschgeschwister ziehen um	Ken Kimura	Yasunari Murakami	Hana Christen	Nominee
The Cowboy	Hildegard Muller	Hildegard Muller		Nominee
Wenn ich groß bin, werde ich Seehund	Nikolaus Heidelbach	Nikolaus Heidelbach		Nominee
Blumkas Tagebuch. Vom Leben in Janusz Korczaks Waisenhaus	Iwona Chmielewska	Iwona Chmielewska	Adam Jaromir	Nominee

Children's Book
Book Title	Author	Illustrator	Translator	Award
Frerk, du Zwerg!	Finn-Ole Heinrich	Rán Flygenring		Winner
My Happy Life	Rose Lagercrantz	Eva Eriksson	Angelika Kutsch	Nominee
Matti und Sami und die drei größten Fehler des Universums	Salah Naoura			Nominee
My Name Is Mina	David Almond		Alexandra Ernst	Nominee
A Monster Calls	Patrick Ness	Jim Kay	Bettina Abarbanell	Nominee
Das schaurige Haus	Martina Wildner			Nominee

Young Adult Book
Book Title	Author	Translator	Award
Es war einmal Indianerland	Nils Mohl		Winner
A Time of Miracles	Anne-Laure Bondoux	Maja von Vogel	Nominee
Vango. Zwischen Himmel und Erde	Timothée de Fombelle	Tobias Scheffel, Sabine Grebing	Nominee
iBoy	Kevin Brooks		Nominee
Und der Himmel rot	Gabi Kreslehner		Nominee
Als gäbe es einen Himmel	Els Beerten	Mirjam Pressler	Nominee

Non-fiction Book
Book Title	Author	Illustrator	Translator	Award
Was, wenn es nur so aussieht, als wäre ich da?	Oscar Brenifier	Jacques Després	Norbert Bolz	Winner
Movie Maker: The Ultimate Guide to Making Films	Tim Grabham, Suridh Hassan, Dave Reeve, Clare Richards	Garry Parsons	Manuela Knetsch	Nominee
Erforsche deine Welt. Mit 100 Forscherfragen durchs ganze Jahr	Anke M. Leitzgen	Lisa Rienermann		Nominee
Wo geht’s lang? Karten erklären die Welt.	Heekyoung Kim	Krystyna Lipka-Sztarballo	Hans-Jürgen Zaborowski	Nominee
Rosa's Bus	Fabrizio Silei	Maurizio A.C. Quarello	Sarah Pasquay	Nominee
Holz. Was unsere Welt zusammenhält	Reinhard Osteroth	Moidi Kretschmann		Nominee

Young Adult Jury Award
Book Title	Author	Illustrator	Translator	Award
A Monster Calls	Patrick Ness	Jim Kay	Bettina Abarbanell	Winner
Katertag. Oder: Was sagt der Knopf bei Nacht?	Regina Dürig			Nominee
Trigger	Susan Vaught		Ann Lecker-Chewiwi	Nominee
The Storyteller	Antonia Michaelis			Nominee
Forbidden	Tabitha Suzuma		Bernadette Ott	Nominee
Als gäbe es einen Himmel	Els Beerten		Mirjam Pressler	Nominee

- Special award for lifetime achievements: Norman Junge (illustrator)

==== 2011 ====
- Yound Adult Jury Award:
  - Nominees:
    - Margos Spuren (Margo's Footsteps) by John Green (text); Sophie Zeitz (translation)
    - Erebos by Ursula Poznanski
    - Freak City by Katrin Schrocke
    - Nichts (Nothing) by Janne Teller (text); Sigrid C. Engeler (translation)
    - Numbers by Rachel Ward (text); Uwe-Michael Gutzschhahn (translation)
    - Wenn du stirbst, zieht dein ganzes Leben an dir vorbei, sagen sie (If you die, your life moves past you, they say) by Lauren Oliver (text); Katharina Meier Diestel (translation)
- Picture book:
  - Nominees:
    - Meine große kleine Welt (My big little world) by Marianne Dubuc (text); Anna Dove (translation)
    - Das Baumhaus (The war) by Marije Tolman (illustration); Ronald Tolman (illustration);
    - Oups by Jean-Luc Fromental (text); Joёlle Jolivet (illustration); Leonard Jacobson (translation)
    - Die Geschichte vom Fuchs, der den Verstand verlor by Martin Baltscheit
    - Papas Arme sind ein Boot (Papa's arms are a boat) by Stein Erik Lunde (text); Øywind Torseter (illustration); Maike Dörries (translation)
    - Tatu und Patu und ihre verrückten Maschinen (Tatu and Patu and their crazy machines) by Sami Toivonen (text); Aino Havukainen (text); Elina Kritzokat (translation)
- Children's book:
  - Nominees:
    - Ich, Gorilla und der Affenstern (Me, Gorilla and Monkey-star) by Frida Nilsson (text); Ulf K. (illustration); Fred Buchinger (translation)
    - Anton taucht ab by Milena Baisch (text); Elke Kusche (illustration)
    - Der letzte unsichtbare Junge (The last invisible boy) by Evan Kuhlman (text); JP Coovert (illustration); Uwe-Michael Gutzschhahn (translation)
    - Rosie und der Urgroßvater by Monika Helfer (text); Michael Köhlmeier (text); Barbara Steinitz (illustration)
    - Onkel Montagues Schauergeschichten (Uncle Montague's tales of horror) by Chris Priestley (text); David Roberts (illustration); Beatrice Howeg (translation)
    - Hundewinter (Dog Winter) by KA Nuzum (text); Gerda Bean (translation)
- Young adult book:
  - Nominees:
    - Schrödinger, Dr. Linda und eine Leiche im Kühlhaus (Schrödinger, Dr. Linda and a corpse in cold storage) by Jan de Leeuw (text); Rolf Erdorf (translation)
    - Tschick (Why We Took the Car) by Wolfgang Herrndorf
    - Town – Irgendwo in Australien (Town – somewhere in Australia) by James Roy (text); Stefanie Schaeffler (translation)
    - Zusammen allein (Together alone) by Karin Bruder
    - Runaway by Oscar Huijelos (text); Günter Ohnemus (translation)
    - Crank by Ellen Hopkins (text); Henning Ahrens (translation)
- Non-fiction book:
  - Nominees:
    - Das große Buch der Bilder und Wörter (The big book of pictures and words) by Ole Könnecke
    - Alles Familie! (All family!) by Alexandra Maxeiner (text); Anke Kuhl (illustration)
    - Der Junge, der Picasso biss (The boy who bit Picasso) by Antony Penrose (words); Egbert Baqué (translation)
    - Zuckerpass und Blutgrätsche by Christian Eichler (text); Jürgen Rieckhoff (illustration)
    - Die genialsten Erfindungen der Natur (The most ingenious inventions of nature) by Sigrid Belzer
    - Von den Sternen bis zum Tau by Jens Soentgen (text); Vitali Konstantinov (illustration)

==== 2010 ====
- Youth Jury Award:
  - Nominees:
    - Einmal (Once) by Morris Gleitzman, ISBN 978-3-551-35862-2
    - Chatroom-Falle by Helen Vreeswijk, ISBN 978-3-7855-6619-0
    - Tote Mädchen lügen nicht (Thirteen Reasons Why) by Jay Asher, ISBN 978-3-570-16020-6
    - Die Tribute von Panem: Tödliche Spiele (The Hunger Games) by Suzanne Collins, ISBN 978-3-7891-3218-6
    - Unser allerbestes Jahr (The Film Club) by David Gilmour, ISBN 978-3-10-027819-7
    - Die Einsamkeit der Primzahlen (The Solitude of Prime Numbers) by Paolo Giordano, ISBN 978-3-89667-397-8
- Picture book:
  - Nominees:
    - Johanna im Zug by Kathrin Schärer, ISBN 978-3-7152-0582-3
    - Wenn ich das 7. Geißlein wär´ by Karla Schneider (text) and Stefanie Harjes (illustration), ISBN 978-3-414-82183-6
    - Gedicht für einen Goldfisch by Jean-Pierre Siméon (text) and Olivier Tallec (illustration), ISBN 978-3-8359-5227-0
    - Garmans Sommer by Stian Hole, ISBN 978-3-446-23314-0
    - An Großvaters Hand: Meine Kindheit in China by Chen Jianghong, ISBN 978-3-89565-210-3
    - Um Mitternacht by Eduard Mörike (text) and Hannes Binder (illustration), ISBN 978-3-905871-06-7
- Children's book:
  - Nominees:
    - Die Bibel: Das Alte Testament by Sybil Gräfin Schönfeldt (text) and Klaus Ensikat (illustration), ISBN 978-3-939944-33-1
    - Timur und die Erfindungen aus lauter Liebe by Marlies Bardeli (text) and Anke Kuhl (illustration), ISBN 978-3-7941-6096-9
    - Meine Mutter ist in Amerika und hat Buffalo Bill getroffen by Jean Regnaud (text), Émile Bravo (illustration) and Michael Hau (Organisation), ISBN 978-3-551-77790-4
    - Das Mädchen mit den drei Namen by Tami Shem-Tov, ISBN 978-3-596-85373-1
    - Warten auf Anya (Waiting for Anya) by Michael Morpurgo, ISBN 978-3-551-58146-4
    - Ihr kriegt mich nicht by Mikael Engström, ISBN 978-3-446-23379-9
- Young adult book:
  - Nominees:
    - Nathan und seine Kinder by Mirjam Pressler, ISBN 978-3-407-81049-6
    - Klick! Zehn Autoren erzählen einen Roman (Click) by David Almond, Eoin Colfer, Roddy Doyle, Deborah Ellis, Nick Hornby, Gregory Maguire, Margo Lanagan, Ruth Ozeki, Linda Sue Park and Tim Wynne-Jones, ISBN 978-3-446-23308-9
    - Such dir was aus, aber beeil dich! Kindsein in zehn Kapiteln by Nadia Budde, ISBN 978-3-596-85321-2
    - Zweiunddieselbe: "Wie viel von mir bin ich?" by Mary E. Pearson, ISBN 978-3-596-85337-3
    - Rotkäppchen muss weinen by Beate Teresa Hanika, ISBN 978-3-596-85336-6
    - Die Karte meiner Träume (The Selected Works of T.S. Spivet) by Reif Larsen, ISBN 978-3-10-044811-8
- Non-fiction book:
  - Nominees:
    - Achtung, fertig, Baustelle! Wie ein Haus geplant und gebaut wird by Rolf Toyka (text), Ferenc B. Regös (illustration) and Heike Ossenkop (Organisation, Photography), ISBN 978-3-8369-5226-2
    - Kuckuck, Krake, Kakerlake: Das etwas andere Tierbuch by Bibi Dumon Tak (text) and Fleur van der Weel (illustration), ISBN 978-3-8270-5282-7
    - drüben! by Simon Schwartz, ISBN 978-3-939080-37-4
    - Mutige Menschen: Widerstand im dritten Reich by Christian Nürnberger, ISBN 978-3-522-30166-4
    - Kanzler lieben Gummistiefel: So funktioniert Politik by Marietta Slomka and Daniel Westland, ISBN 978-3-570-13555-6
    - Die nächste GENeration: Science + Fiction by Charlotte Kerner (text and Editing), Claudia Eberhard-Metzger (text) and Susanne Paulsen (text), ISBN 978-3-407-75346-5

=== 2000–2009 ===
==== 2009 ====
- Young Adult Jury Award: Die Bücherdiebin (The Book Thief) by Markus Zusak, ISBN 978-3-570-13274-6
  - Nominees:
    - Wie man unsterblich wird (Ways to Live Forever) by Sally Nicholls, ISBN 978-3-446-23047-7
    - Wie ich zum besten Schlagzeuger der Welt wurde – und warum (Drums, Girls, and Dangerous Pie) by Jordan Sonnenblick, ISBN 978-3-551-58177-8
    - Anas Geschichte (Ana's Story) by Jenna Bush (text) und Mia Baxter (photography), ISBN 978-3-423-62372-8
    - Die Nackten by Iva Procházková, ISBN 978-3-7941-8081-3
    - Ich, Adrian Mayfield by Floortje Zwigtman, ISBN 978-3-8369-5200-2
- Picture book: Geschichten aus der Vorstadt des Universums (Tales From Outer Suburbia) by Shaun Tan, ISBN 978-3-551-58198-3
  - Nominees:
    - Leute by Blexbolex, ISBN 978-3-941087-02-6
    - Was tun!? by Dieter Böge (text) und Bernd Mölck-Tassel (illustration), ISBN 978-3-905871-01-2
    - Räuberkinder by Antje Damm, ISBN 978-3-8369-5191-3
    - Das Kinder-Verwirr-Buch by Norman Junge (illustration) und Joachim Ringelnatz (text), ISBN 978-3-351-04085-7
    - Ein neues Land (The Arrival) by Shaun Tan, ISBN 978-3-551-73431-0
- Children's book: Rico, Oskar und die Tieferschatten by Andreas Steinhöfel (text) and Peter Schössow (illustration), ISBN 978-3-551-55551-9
  - Nominees:
    - Alabama Moon by Watt Key, ISBN 978-3-7915-1114-6
    - Mut für Drei by Bart Moeyaert (text) and Rotraut Susanne Berner (illustration), ISBN 978-3-446-20896-4
    - Rabenhaar by Do van Ranst, ISBN 978-3-551-55446-8
    - Tote Maus für Papas Leben by Marjolijn Hof, ISBN 978-3-8270-5323-7
    - Die Entdeckung des Hugo Cabret (The Invention of Hugo Cabret) by Brian Selznick, ISBN 978-3-570-13300-2
- Young adult book: The Road of the Dead (The Road of the Dead) by Kevin Brooks, ISBN 978-3-423-71286-6
  - Nominees:
    - Wintereis by Peter van Gestel, ISBN 978-3-407-81040-3
    - Verkauft (Sold) by Patricia McCormick, ISBN 978-3-596-85243-7
    - Nach dem Unglück schwang ich mich auf, breitet meine Flügel aus und flog davon (After the Wreck, I Picked Myself Up, Spread My Wings, and Flew Away) by Joyce Carol Oates, ISBN 978-3-446-20986-2
    - Die Nackten by Iva Procházková, ISBN 978-3-7941-8081-3
    - Scherbenpark by Alina Bronsky, ISBN 978-3-462-04030-2
- Non-fiction book: Das Rätsel der Varusschlacht by Wolfgang Korn (text) und Klaus Ensikat (illustration), ISBN 978-3-7716-4379-9
  - Nominees:
    - Was ist da passiert? by Béatrice Vincent (text) und Bruno Heitz (illustration), ISBN 978-3-8369-5167-8
    - Geheime Welt der Raupen by Monika Lange (text) und Ingo Arndt (Photos), ISBN 978-3-7941-9135-2
    - So leben wir. Menschen am Rande der Megacitys (The Places We Live) by Jonas Bendiksen, ISBN 978-3-89660-587-0
    - Der Traum vom Fliegen by Susanna Partsch and Rosemarie Zacher, ISBN 978-3-8270-5297-1
- Special prize for Illustration: Jutta Bauer

==== 2008 ====
- Young Adult Jury Award: Simpel (Simple) by Marie-Aude Murail, ISBN 3-596-85207-2
  - Nominees:
    - Running Man (The Running Man) by Michael Gerard Bauer, ISBN 0-06-145508-3
    - Der Junge im gestreiften Pyjama (The Boy in the Striped Pyjamas) by John Boyne, ISBN 3-596-80683-6
    - Eine wie Alaska (Looking for Alaska) by John Green, ISBN 3-446-20853-4
    - Die Minute der Wahrheit. Roman über die Liebe und die Kunst by Bjørn Sortland, ISBN 3-446-20902-6
    - Nick & Norah. Soundtrack einer Nacht (Nick and Norah's Infinite Playlist) by Rachel Cohn, David Levithan, ISBN 3-570-13126-2
- Picture book: Hänsel und Gretel by Jacob und Wilhelm Grimm (text), Susanne Janssen (illustration), ISBN 3-356-01226-6
  - Nominees:
    - Alle seine Entlein by Christian Duda (text), Julia Friese (illustration), ISBN 3-907588-85-1
    - Wann kommt Mama? (Waiting For Mama) by Lee Tae-Jun (text), Kim Dong-Seong (illustration), Andreas Schirmer (translation), ISBN 3-314-01535-6
    - Ente, Tod und Tulpe (Duck, Death and the Tulip) by Wolf Erlbruch, ISBN 3-88897-461-5
    - Der weiße und der schwarze Bär by Jürg Schubiger (text), Eva Muggenthaler (illustration), ISBN 3-7795-0078-7
    - 5 Songs by Gipi, ISBN 3-939080-18-7
- Children's book: Ein Bild von Ivan (Portrait of Ivan) by Paula Fox, ISBN 3-414-82059-5
  - Nominees:
    - Die schlaue Mama Sambona by Hermann Schulz (text), Tobias Krejtschi (illustration), ISBN 2-84407-076-0
    - Zarah. Du hast doch keine Angst, oder? by Zoran Drvenkar (text), Martin Baltscheit (illustration), ISBN 3-8270-5249-1
    - Big (Piggy) by Mireille Geus, ISBN 3-8251-7561-8
    - Das Gegenteil von Sorgen by Benny Lindelauf, ISBN 3-8270-5214-9
    - KIRA-KIRA (Kira-Kira) by Cynthia Kadohata, ISBN 1-4169-1045-X
- Young adult book: was wäre wenn (Just in Case) by Meg Rosoff, ISBN 3-551-58139-8
  - Nominees:
    - Eine wie Alaska (Looking for Alaska) by John Green, ISBN 3-446-20853-4
    - Kissing the Rain by Kevin Brooks, ISBN 1-4176-8236-1
    - Dann tu's doch by Andreas Schendel, ISBN 3-596-80792-1
    - Superhero (Death of a Superhero) by Anthony McCarten, ISBN 3-257-23733-2
    - Ein Sommer in Venedig by Włodzimierz Odojewski, ISBN 3-86555-044-4
- Non-fiction book: Der Kick. Ein Lehrstück über Gewalt by Andres Veiel, ISBN 3-570-30624-0
  - Nominees:
    - 1 roter Punkt (One Red Dot) by David A. Carter, ISBN 3-414-82082-X
    - Pole, Packeis, Pinguine. Leben im ewigen Eis by Karoline Stürmer (text), Doris Katharina Künster (Arrangement), ISBN 3-423-62322-5
    - Sprache oder Was den Mensch zum Menschen macht by Nikolaus Nützel, ISBN 3-570-13027-4
    - Rotes Land Gelber Fluss. Eine Geschichte aus der chinesischen Kulturrevolution (Red Land, Yellow River: A Story From the Cultural Revolution) by Ange Zhang, ISBN 3-446-20908-5
    - Ich war das Kind von Holocaustüberlebenden (I Was a Child of Holocaust Survivors) by Bernice Eisenstein, ISBN 3-8270-0756-9
- Special prize for Translation: Gabriele Haefs

==== 2007 ====
- Young Adult Jury Award: Der Joker (The Messenger) by Markus Zusak (Author), Alexandra Ernst (translation), ISBN 3-570-30539-2
  - Nominees:
    - Die fünf Tore – Todeskreis (Raven's Gate) by Anthony Horowitz, ISBN 3-7855-6443-0
    - Bis(s) zum Morgengrauen (Twilight) by Stephenie Meyer, ISBN 3-551-35894-X
    - Keeper (Keeper) by Mal Peet, ISBN 0-7445-9025-6
    - Leihst du mir deinen Blick? Eine E-Mail Freundschaft zwischen Jerusalem und Gaza (Message in a Bottle) by Valérie Zenatti, ISBN 3-7915-2579-4
    - Zwei Wege in den Sommer by Robert Habeck and Andrea Paluch, ISBN 3-596-80769-7
- Picture book: Königin Gisela (Where the Girls Are) by Nikolaus Heidelbach, ISBN 3-407-79906-3
  - Nominees:
    - Die Torte ist weg! (Where is the cake?) by Thé Tjong-Khing, ISBN 3-89565-173-7
    - Krawinkel & Eckstein by Wouter van Reek, ISBN 3-7941-5121-6
    - Der kleine Häwelmann (Little Hobbin) by Theodor Storm (text), Henriette Sauvant (illustration), ISBN 3-314-00880-5
    - Herr Eichhorn und der Mond (Mr Squirrel and the Moon) by Sebastian Meschenmoser, ISBN 3-480-22231-5
    - Pikko, die Hexe by Toon Tellegen (text), Marit Törnqvist (illustration), From the Dutch by Mirjam Pressler, ISBN 3-7941-5139-9
- Children's book: Schwester by Jon Fosse (text), Aljoscha Blau (illustration), Hinrich Schmidt-Henkel (translation), ISBN 3-907588-70-3
  - Nominees:
    - Die besten Beerdigungen der Welt (All The Dear Little Animals) by Ulf Nilsson (text), Eva Eriksson (illustration), ISBN 3-89565-174-5
    - Ein Zwilling für Leo by Sébastien Joanniez (text), Régis Lejonc (illustration), ISBN 3-407-78977-7
    - Steppenwind und Adlerflügel by Xavier-Laurent Petit, ISBN 3-7915-1602-7
    - Das Buch von allen Dingen (The Book of Everything) by Guus Kuijer, ISBN 3-7891-4022-8
    - Samuraisommer by Åke Edwardson, ISBN 3-551-55441-2
- Young adult book: Wir retten Leben, sagt mein Vater by Do van Ranst (Author), Andrea Kluitmann (translation), ISBN 3-551-58156-8
  - Nominees:
    - Meisterwerk (Framed) by Frank Cottrell Boyce, ISBN 3-551-58145-2
    - Wenn er kommt, dann laufen wir (Dark Angel) by David Klass, ISBN 3-401-50018-X
    - Paradiesische Aussichten (Just Like Tomorrow) by Faïza Guène, ISBN 3-551-58154-1
    - Ein reiner Schrei (A Swift Pure Cry) by Siobhan Dowd, ISBN 3-551-58158-4
    - Liebeslinien by Marjaleena Lembcke, ISBN 3-423-62351-9
- Non-fiction book: Mutter hat Krebs (Mom's Cancer) by Brian Fies (Author), Wolfgang J. Fuchs (translation), ISBN 3-89660-356-6
  - Nominees:
    - Was macht der Bär im Museum? by Claire d'Harcourt, ISBN 3-89660-381-7
    - Mount Everest by Maja Nielsen and Jochen Hemmleb, ISBN 3-8067-4834-9
    - Wolfgang Amadé Mozart by Barbara Mungengast (concept and design), Sigrid Laube (text), Nadia Budde (illustration), ISBN 3-85493-123-9
    - Petr Ginz. Prager Tagebuch 1941-1942 (The Diary of Petr Ginz) by Chava Pressburger, ISBN 3-8270-5245-9
    - Geschichte der Elektrizität by Henning Boëtius, ISBN 3-407-75326-8
- Special prize for Writing: Kirsten Boie

==== 2006 ====
- Young People's Prize: Lucas by Kevin Brooks/ Uwe-Michael Gutzschhahn (translation), ISBN 1-4025-9932-3
  - Nominees:
    - Whisper by Isabel Abedi, ISBN 3-401-02999-1
    - was geht wenn du bleibst by Zoran Drvenkar, ISBN 3-551-58148-7
    - Eve Green (Eve Green) by Susan Fletcher, ISBN 0-00-719040-9
    - Mit offenen Augen. Die Geschichte von Freaky Green Eyes (Freaky Green Eyes) by Joyce Carol Oates, ISBN 3-423-62297-0
    - Septimus Heap. Magyk (Magyk) by Angie Sage, ISBN 3-423-21107-5
- Picture book: Gehört das so??! Die Geschichte von Elvis by Peter Schössow, ISBN 3-446-20563-2
  - Nominees:
    - Zwei Schwestern bekommen Besuch (The Visitor) by Sonja Bougaeva, ISBN 3-7152-0503-2
    - Die Wölfe in den Wänden (The Wolves in the Walls) by Neil Gaiman (text) and Dave McKean (illustration), ISBN 3-551-51648-0
    - Rote Wangen by Heinz Janisch (text) and Aljoscha Blau (illustration), ISBN 3-351-04062-8
    - Gesichter (Faces) by François und Jean Robert, ISBN 3-8067-5080-7
- Children's book: Lilis Leben eben (That's Life, Lily) by Valérie Dayre/ Maja von Vogel (translation), ISBN 3-551-35741-2
  - Nominees:
    - Besuche bei Charles by Vincent Cuvellier (text) and Charles Dutertre (illustration), ISBN 3-7026-5764-9
    - Weißnich by Joke van Leeuwen, ISBN 3-8067-5079-3
    - Ein glücklicher Zufall und andere Kindergeschichten by Ljudmila Ulitzkaja (text) and Wolf Erlbruch (illustration), ISBN 3-446-20603-5
    - SoB.It: Heidis Geschichte (So B. It) by Sarah Weeks, ISBN 3-446-20643-4
- Young adult book: Wie schön weiß ich bin by Dolf Verroen/ Rolf Erdorf (translation), ISBN 3-596-80729-8
  - Nominees:
    - Feuerschlucker (The Fire-Eaters) by David Almond, ISBN 3-423-62315-2
    - Ich bin Amerika (America) by E.R. Frank, ISBN 3-407-80940-9
    - Evil. Das Böse (Ondskan) by Jan Guillou, ISBN 3-423-62301-2
    - Die Nacht, als Mats nicht heimkam by Martha Heesen, ISBN 3-596-80707-7
    - So lebe ich jetzt (How I Live Now) by Meg Rosoff, ISBN 3-551-35761-7
- Non-fiction book: 'Denk nicht, wir bleiben hier!' – Die Lebensgeschichte des Sinto Hugo Höllenreiner by Anja Tuckermann, ISBN 3-446-20648-5
  - Nominees:
    - Jasper schafft Platz by Martin Bertelsen (text) and Hartmut Kozok (illustration), ISBN 3-8303-1086-2
    - Das Buch vom Müssen und Machen (Poop: A Natural History of the Unmentionable) by Nicola Davies (text) and Neal Layton (illustration), ISBN 3-7941-5123-2
    - Das große Familienbuch der Feste und Bräuche by Christa Holtei (text) and Tilman Michalski (illustration), ISBN 3-491-38071-5
    - Die Welt der Vögel für Kinder erzählt (Birds) by Gilles Martin (Photos), Jean Chevallier (illustration), Philippe J. Dubois and Valérie Guidoux (text), ISBN 3-89660-264-0
- Special prize for Illustration: Rotraut Susanne Berner

==== 2005 ====
- Young People's Prize: Im Schatten der Wächter (Inventing Elliot) by Graham Gardner/ Alexandra Ernst (translation), ISBN 3-7725-2251-3
  - Nominees:
    - In meiner Haut (Out of the Fire) by Deborah Froese, ISBN 3-407-80918-2
    - Kafka am Strand (Kafka on the Shore) by Haruki Murakami, ISBN 3-8321-7866-X
    - Ein Meer dazwischen, eine Welt entfernt (An ocean apart, a world away) by Lensey Namioka, ISBN 3-407-80923-9
    - Asphalt Tribe: Kinder der Straße (Asphalt Tribe) by Morton Rhue, ISBN 3-473-35246-2
    - Lilly unter den Linden by Anne C. Voorhoeve, ISBN 3-473-35251-9
- Picture book: Han Gan und das Wunderpferd by Chen Jianghong, ISBN 3-89565-155-9
  - Nominees:
    - Der Zapperdockel und der Wock by Georg Bydlinski (text) and Jens Rassmus (illustration), ISBN 3-85191-322-1
    - Die große Frage (The Big Question) by Wolf Erlbruch, ISBN 3-87294-948-9
    - Meeres Stille und Glückliche Fahrt by Johann Wolfgang von Goethe (text) and Peter Schössow (illustration), ISBN 3-446-20433-4
    - Brundibar (Brundibár) by Tony Kushner (text) and Maurice Sendak (illustration), ISBN 3-8067-5073-4
    - Echte Kerle (Boys Are Best!) by Manuela Olten, ISBN 3-907588-51-7
- Children's book: Die Kurzhosengang by Viktor Caspak and Yves Lanois/ Andreas Steinhöfel (translation) and Ole Könnecke (illustration), ISBN 3-551-35564-9
  - Nominees:
    - Despereaux (The Tale of Despereaux) by Kate DiCamillo (text) and Timothy Basil Ering (illustration), ISBN 3-7915-2799-1
    - 35 Kilo Hoffnung (95 pounds of Hope) by Anna Gavalda, ISBN 3-8270-5014-6
    - Die furchtbar hartnäckigen Gapper von Frip (The Very Persistent Gappers of Frip) by George Saunders (text) and Lane Smith (illustration), ISBN 3-8270-5033-2
    - Bartimäus: Das Amulett von Samarkand (The Amulet of Samarkand) by Jonathan Stroud, ISBN 3-570-12775-3
    - Was ich vergessen habe by Edward van de Vendel, ISBN 3-551-55236-3
- Young adult book: Schneeweiß und Russenrot (Snow White and Russian Red) by Dorota Masłowska, ISBN 3-462-03376-X
  - Nominees:
    - Busfahrt mit Kuhn by Tamara Bach, ISBN 3-7891-3156-3
    - Martyn Pig (Martyn Pig) by Kevin Brooks, ISBN 3-423-70866-2
    - Doing it (Doing It) by Melvin Burgess, ISBN 3-551-58131-2
    - Monsterwochen (Stoner and Spaz) by Ron Koertge, ISBN 3-551-58121-5
    - Lauf, Junge, lauf (Run, boy, run) by Uri Orlev, ISBN 3-407-80925-5
- Non-fiction book: Nester bauen, Höhlen knabbern by Anne Möller, ISBN 3-7152-0486-9
  - Nominees:
    - Nano?! Die Technik des 21. Jahrhunderts by Niels Boeing, ISBN 3-87134-488-5
    - Sternenflug und Sonnenfeuer: Drei Astronominnen und ihre Lebensgeschichten by Charlotte Kerner (text & Publisher), Claudia Eberhard-Metzger (text) and Renate Ries (text)
    - Das Buch von der Zukunft: Ein Reiseführer by Andreas Eschbach, ISBN 3-87134-476-1
    - Warum? (Why?) by Lila Prap, ISBN 3-907588-56-8
    - Der Baum des Lebens (The Tree of Life) by Peter Sís, ISBN 3-446-20523-3
- Special prize for Translation: Harry Rowohlt

==== 2004 ====
- Young People's Prize: Das Schwert in der Stille (Across the Nightingale Floor) by Lian Hearn, ISBN 3-551-58106-1
  - Nominees:
    - Höhenflug abwärts by Jana Frey, ISBN 3-7855-4408-1
    - Tintenherz (Inkheart) by Cornelia Funke, ISBN 3-7915-0465-7
    - Das Orangenmädchen (The Orange Girl) by Jostein Gaarder, ISBN 3-446-20344-3
    - Sie hatten einen Traum by Thomas Jeier, ISBN 3-8000-2999-5
    - Harry Potter und der Orden des Phönix (Harry Potter and the Order of the Phoenix) by J. K. Rowling, ISBN 3-551-55555-9
- Picture book: Fuchs (Fox) by Margaret Wild (text) and Ron Brooks (illustration), ISBN 3-551-51597-2
  - Nominees:
    - Du schon wieder by Zoran Drvenkar (text) and Ole Könnecke (illustration), ISBN 3-551-55240-1
    - Nelson, der Käpt'n und ich by Katja Gehrmann, ISBN 3-551-51576-X
    - Der hölzerne Mann by Melanie Kemmler, ISBN 3-351-04034-2
    - Kwatsch (Baloney (Henry P.)) by Jon Scieszka (text) and Lane Smith (illustration), ISBN 3-551-51569-7
    - Einer, der nichts merkte by Robert Walser (text) and Käthi Bhend (illustration), ISBN 3-7152-0467-2
- Children's book: Ein Schaf fürs Leben by Maritgen Matter (text) and Anke Faust (illustration), ISBN 3-7891-4239-5
  - Nominees:
    - Neun nackte Nilpferddamen by Gerda Anger-Schmidt (text) and Renate Habinger (illustration), ISBN 3-85326-272-4
    - Der beste Hund der Welt (Love That Dog) by Sharon Creech (text) and Rotraut Susanne Berner (illustration), ISBN 3-596-85113-0
    - Die Busfahrerin by Vincent Cuvellier (text) and Candice Hayat (illustration), ISBN 3-7026-5752-5
    - Tintenherz (Inkheart) by Cornelia Funke, ISBN 3-7915-0465-7
    - Ein rotes Herz, ein blauer Schmetterling by Annika Thor, ISBN 3-551-55237-1
- Young adult book: Marsmädchen (Girl From Mars) by Tamara Bach
  - Nominees:
    - Brando by Mikael Engström, ISBN 3-446-20303-6
    - Der Drachenflieger (The Kite Rider) by Geraldine McCaughrean, ISBN 3-89106-426-8
    - Die Braut meines Bruders (Bride on Paper) by Nava Semel, ISBN 3-407-80907-7
    - Mimus (Mimus) by Lilli Thal, ISBN 3-8067-5029-7
    - Jinx (Jinx) by Margaret Wild, ISBN 3-446-20338-9
- Non-fiction book: Lieber wütend als traurig. Die Lebensgeschichte der Ulrike Marie Meinhof by Alois Prinz, ISBN 3-407-80905-0
  - Nominees:
    - Christophs Experimente by Christoph Biemann (text) and Hildegard Müller (illustration / layout), ISBN 3-446-20339-7
    - Die Kinder-Uni: Forscher erklären die Rätsel der Welt by Ulrich Janßen / Ulla Steuernagel (text) and Klaus Ensikat (illustration), ISBN 3-421-05695-1
    - Denk dir die Welt: Philosophie für Kinder by Brigitte Labbé / Michel Puech (text) and Jaques Azam (illustration), ISBN 3-7855-4677-7
    - Der Mikrokosmos für Kinder erklärt by Oliver Meckes and Nicole Ottawa, ISBN 3-570-19438-8
    - Selbstdenken! 20 Praktiken der Philosophie by Jens Soentgen (text) and Nadia Budde (illustration), ISBN 3-87294-943-8
- Special prize for Writing: Benno Pludra

==== 2003 ====
- Young People's Prize: Krokodil im Nacken by Klaus Kordon, ISBN 3-407-80893-3
  - Nominees:
    - Eine für vier (Sisterhood of the Traveling Pants) by Ann Brashares, ISBN 3-570-12679-X
    - Sag mir, was du siehst by Zoran Drvenkar, ISBN 3-551-58097-9
    - RaumZeit by Christian Linker, ISBN 3-423-20565-2
    - Lab 47: Gefahr aus dem Labor (Bloodline) by Malcolm Rose, ISBN 3-401-05386-8
    - Ohrensausen by Jochen Till, ISBN 3-473-35239-X
- Picture book: Unsichtbar (Invisible) by Katja Kamm, ISBN 3-499-12106-9
  - Nominees:
    - Mitten in der Nacht by Bruno Blume (text) and Jacky Gleich (illustration), ISBN 3-596-85115-7
    - Nein! Tomaten ess ich nicht! (I Will Not Ever Never Eat a Tomato) by Lauren Child, ISBN 3-551-51574-3
    - Das Notizbuch des Zeichners by Mohieddin Ellabbad, ISBN 3-7152-0473-7
    - Die Schöpfung by Friedrich Karl Waechter, ISBN 3-257-02076-7
    - Die drei Schweine (The Three Pigs) by David Wiesner, ISBN 3-551-51556-5
- Children's book: Schlimmes Ende (Awful End)by Philip Ardagh, ISBN 3-570-12701-X
  - Nominees:
    - So was macht die Liebe by Bo R. Holmberg, ISBN 3-7891-3708-1
    - Salamander im Netz by Elizabeth Honey (text) and Jörg Mühle (illustration), ISBN 3-407-79849-0
    - Wenn dich ein Löwe nach der Uhrzeit fragt: Eine Afrikageschichte by Hermann Schulz, ISBN 3-87294-912-8
    - Esperanza by Jakob Wegelius, ISBN 3-491-37458-8
    - Die fabelhaften Barker Girls (Double Act) by Jacqueline Wilson (text) and Susann Opel-Götz (illustration), ISBN 3-7891-5109-2
- Young adult book: Prinz William, Maximilian Minsky und ich (Prince William, Maximillian Minsky and me) by Holly-Jane Rahlens, ISBN 3-499-21274-9
  - Nominees:
    - Hathaway Jones by Katja Behrens, ISBN 3-407-80896-8
    - Was wisst ihr denn schon (The Facts Speak For Themselves) by Brock Cole, ISBN 3-551-58077-4
    - Und wenn schon! by Karen-Susan Fessel, ISBN 3-7891-3507-0
    - Das Rätsel des Feuers (Playing With Fire) by Henning Mankell, ISBN 3-7891-4231-X
    - Prinz Faisals Ring (The Ring of the Slave Prince) by Bjarne Reuter, ISBN 3-7941-4800-2
- Non-fiction book: Geschichte der Wirtschaft by Nikolaus Piper
  - Nominees:
    - Die Geschichte der Titanic by Eric Kentley (text) and Steve Noon (illustration), ISBN 3-411-07421-3
    - Philosophie: Abenteuer Denken by Stephen Law (text) and Daniel Postgate (illustration), ISBN 3-401-05332-9
    - Weltgeschichte by Manfred Mai, ISBN 3-446-20191-2
    - Sag mir, wie ist Afrika? by Marie Sellier (text) and Marion Lesage (illustration), ISBN 3-87294-914-4
    - Die Leute von Birka: So lebten die Wikinger by Mats Wahl (text), Björn Ambrosiani (text) and Sven Nordqvist (illustration), ISBN 3-7891-5111-4
- Special prize for Illustration: Wolf Erlbruch

==== 2002 ====
- Picture book: Die ganze Welt (A Whole World) by Katy Couprie and Antonin Louchard, ISBN 3-8067-4954-X
  - Nominees:
    - Opas Engel (Grandpa's Angel) by Jutta Bauer, ISBN 3-551-51543-3
    - Rotkäppchen by the Brothers Grimm (text) and Susanna Janssen (illustration), ISBN 3-446-20022-3
    - Schwi-Schwa-Schweinehund by Karoline Kehr, ISBN 3-357-00925-0
    - Der Tag an dem Marie ein Ungeheuer war by Lotte Kinskofer (text) and Verena Ballhaus (illustration), ISBN 3-907588-23-1
    - Mama ist groß wie ein Turm by Brigitte Schär (text) and Jacky Gleich (illustration), ISBN 3-446-20023-1
- Children's book: Wir alle für immer zusammen by Guus Kuijer, illustrated by Alice Hoogstad, ISBN 3-7891-4011-2
  - Nominees:
    - War mal ein Lama in Alabama by Irmela Brender (text) and Verena Ballhaus (illustration), ISBN 3-7891-3132-6
    - Der einzige Vogel, der die Kälte nicht fürchtet by Zoran Drvenkar (text) and Martin Baltscheit (illustration), ISBN 3-551-55220-7
    - Winn-Dixie (Because of Winn-Dixie) by Kate DiCamillo (Author) and Sabine Ludwig (translation), ISBN 3-7915-2791-6
    - Paul ohne Jacob (Radiance Descending) by Paula Fox (Author) and Cornelia Krutz-Arnold (translation), ISBN 3-7941-4375-2
    - Mein Großvater war ein Kirschbaum by Angela Nanetti (text), Józef Wilkoń (illustration) and Rosemarie Griebel-Kruip (translation), ISBN 3-491-37438-3
- Young adult book: Ich habe einfach Glück by Alexa Hennig von Lange, ISBN 3-8077-0154-0
  - Nominees:
    - Wir Goonyas, ihr Nungas (Deadly, Unna?) by Phillip Gwynne (Author), Cornelia Krutz-Arnold (translation), ISBN 3-7941-4588-7
    - Malka Mai by Mirjam Pressler, ISBN 3-407-80879-8
    - Falsch gedacht by Sigurd Pruetz, ISBN 3-407-80880-1
    - Defender: Geschichten aus der Mitte der Welt by Andreas Steinhöfel, ISBN 3-551-58068-5
    - Der Unsichtbare (Den osynlige) by Mats Wahl (Author) and Angelika Kutsch (translation), ISBN 3-446-20045-2
- Non-fiction book: Das visuelle Lexikon der Umwelt by Bernd Schuh, ISBN 3-8067-4500-5
  - Nominees:
    - Als Deutschland am Äquator lag: Eine Reise in die Urgeschichte by Volker Arzt (text) and Knud Jaspersen (illustration), ISBN 3-87134-418-4
    - Mensch & Co.:Aufregende Geschichten von Lebewesen, die auf uns wohnen by Jörg Blech (text) and Antje von Stemm (illustration), ISBN 3-499-21162-9
    - Die Geschichte der Juden by Lutz van Dijk (text) and Renate Schlicht (illustration), ISBN 3-593-36703-3
    - Wörterwerkstatt: Tipps für Jugendliche, die gern schreiben by Sylvia Englert (text) and Stefanie Scharnberg (illustration), ISBN 3-7707-3133-6
    - Der Mann mit der Zwitschermaschine by Mario Giordano, ISBN 3-351-04019-9
- Special prize for Translation: Cornelia Krutz-Arnold

==== 2001 ====
- Picture book: Schreimutter by Jutta Bauer, ISBN 3-407-79264-6
  - Nominees:
    - Willi der Maler (Willy's Pictures) by Anthony Browne (Author) and Peter Baumann (translation), ISBN 3-8303-1012-9
    - Otto Karotto by Chiara Carrer (Author), Dorothea Löcker and Alexander Potyka (translation), ISBN 3-85452-842-6
    - Pozor by Anna Maar (text) and Bernd Mölck-Tassel (illustration), ISBN 3-907588-16-9
    - Die Prinzessin kommt um vier: Eine Liebesgeschichte by Wolfdietrich Schnurre (text) and Rotraut Susanne Berner (illustration), ISBN 3-351-04000-8
    - Steinsuppe by Anaïs Vaugelade (Author) and Tobias Scheffel (translation), ISBN 3-89565-115-X
- Children's book: Der Tag, als ich lernte die Spinnen zu zähmen by Jutta Richter, ISBN 3-446-19896-2
  - Nominees:
    - Der Mann mit der Maske (Angel Square) by Brian Doyle (Author) and Sylke Hachmeister (translation), ISBN 3-7891-3303-5
    - Herr der Diebe (The Thief Lord) by Cornelia Funke, ISBN 3-7915-0457-6
    - Großer Ozean: Gedichte für alle by Hans-Joachim Gelberg (Editor), ISBN 3-407-79818-0
    - Reise gegen den Wind by Peter Härtling, ISBN 3-407-79814-8
    - Kamos gesammelte Abenteuer by Daniel Pennac (Author) and Wolfgang Rentz (translation), ISBN 3-407-79811-3
- Young adult book: Die ohne Segen sind (The Lesser Blessed) by Richard van Camp, ISBN 3-473-35205-5
  - Nominees:
    - Ulla und alles by Kim Fupz Aakeson (Author) and Christel Hildebrandt (translation), ISBN 3-7260-0540-4
    - Im Regen stehen by Zoran Drvenkar, ISBN 3-499-20993-4
    - Löcher: Die Geheimnisse von Green Lake (Holes) by Louis Sachar (Author) and Birgitt Kollmann (translation), ISBN 3-407-80867-4
    - Sonnennebel by Hermann Schulz, ISBN 3-551-58064-2
    - East End, West End und dazwischen Maniac Magee (Maniac Magee) by Jerry Spinelli (Author) and Andreas Steinhöfel (translation), ISBN 3-7915-1979-4
- Non-fiction book: Sonnenfresser. Wie Pflanzen leben by Susanne Paulsen, ISBN 3-87134-397-8
  - Nominees:
    - Erzählt es euren Kindern: Der Holocaust in Europa by Stéphane Bruchfeld, Paul A. Levine (Authors), Uwe Danker (Editor) and Robert Bohn (translation), ISBN 3-570-12531-9
    - Abenteuer Zukunft: Projekte und Visionen für das dritte Jahrtausend by Eirik Newth (Author) and Ina Kronenberger (translation), ISBN 3-446-19831-8
    - "Und jedem Anfang wohnt ein Zauber inne": Die Lebensgeschichte des Hermann Hesse by Alois Prinz, ISBN 3-407-80874-7
    - Und was kommt dann?: Das Kinderbuch vom Tod by Pernilla Stalfelt (Author) and Birgitta Kicherer (translation), ISBN 3-89565-110-9
    - Das unendliche Reich der Sterne: Die faszinierende Welt der Astronomie by Jürgen Teichmann (text) and Christof Gießler (illustration), ISBN 3-401-02069-2
- Special prize for Writing: Peter Härtling

==== 2000 ====
- Picture book: Eins zwei drei Tier (One Two Three Me) by Nadia Budde, ISBN 3-87294-827-X
  - Nominees:
    - Flieg, Ente, flieg! (Sitting Ducks) by Michael Bedard (Author) and Mirjam Pressler (translation), ISBN 3-473-33948-2
    - Nachts by Wolf Erlbruch, ISBN 3-87294-834-2
    - Wach doch auf! by Jan Jutta (Author) and Andrea Kluitmann (translation), ISBN 3-551-51488-7
    - Waas! (What!) by Kate Lum (text), Adrian Johnson (illustration) and Thomas Minssen (translation), ISBN 3-907588-09-6
    - Affenzoff by John A. Rowe, ISBN 3-85195-586-2
- Children's book: Hodder der Nachtschwärmer by Bjarne Reuter, ISBN 3-7915-1670-1
  - Nominees:
    - Nicht Chicago. Nicht hier. by Kirsten Boie, ISBN 3-7891-3131-8
    - Der unsichtbare Vater by Amelie Fried (text) and Jacky Gleich (illustration), ISBN 3-446-19737-0
    - Viegelchen will fliegen by Joke van Leeuwen (Author) and Hanni Ehlers (translation), ISBN 3-446-19738-9
    - Jakob heimatlos by Benno Plundra, ISBN 3-358-02182-3
    - Anna und die Sache mit der Liebe by Kaat Vrancken (text), Rotraut Susanne Berner (illustration) and Silke Schmidt (translation), ISBN 3-596-85043-6
- Young adult book: Blueprint by Charlotte Kerner, ISBN 3-407-80837-2
  - Nominees:
    - So ein alberner Satz wie: Ich liebe dich by Martin Casariego Córdoba (Author) and Katrin Fieber (translation), ISBN 3-446-19745-1
    - Ti by Henri van Daele (Author), Jeanne Oidtmann-van Beek und Peter Oidtmann (translation), ISBN 3-89106-364-4
    - Victor: Roman über den Wolfsjungen aus dem Aveyron (Victor: A Novel Based on the Life of the Savage of Averyon) by Mordicai Gerstein (Author) and Bettine Braun (translation), ISBN 3-7725-1860-5
    - Tanz auf dünnem Eis by Pernilla Glaser (Author) and Birgitta Kicherer (translation), ISBN 3-551-58042-1
    - Das Mädchen am Kanal by Thierry Lenain (Author) and Anne Braun (translation), ISBN 3-596-85049-5
- Non-fiction book: Fräulein Pop und Mrs. Up und ihre große Reise durchs Papierland. Ein Pop-up-Buch zum Selberbasteln by Antje von Stemm, ISBN 3-499-20963-2
  - Nominees:
    - Young Oxford Urgeschichte by Jill Bailey, Tony Seddon (Authors) and Cäcilie Plieninger (translation), ISBN 3-407-75300-4
    - Wer regt sich hier so auf? Eine kleine Völkerkunde für Kinder by Pascale Bougeault (Author), Markus Weber und Sabine Meyer-Bachem (translation), ISBN 3-89565-095-1
    - Wie die Häuser in den Himmel wuchsen: Die Geschichte des Bauens by Susanna Partsch, ISBN 3-446-19749-4
    - Hauptsache Köpfchen! Was unser Gehirn alles kann by Pete Rowan (text), John Temperton (illustration) and Monika Lange (translation), ISBN 3-276-00200-0
    - Ich und ein Baby? by Christine Wolfrum, ISBN 3-423-78146-7
- Special Prize for Illustration: Nikolaus Heidelbach

=== 1990–1999 ===
1999

- Picture book: Der rote Wolf by F. K. Waechter, ISBN 3-257-00848-1
- Children's book: Eine Insel im Meer (A Faraway Island) by Annika Thor, ISBN 3-551-35104-X
- Young adult book: Bruder (Brothers) by Ted van Lieshout, ISBN 3-7876-9678-4
- Non-fiction book: Tibet. Das Geheimnis der roten Schachtel (Tibet through the Red Box) by Peter Sís, ISBN 3-446-19442-8
- Special prize for Translation: Birgitta Kicherer

1998

- Picture book: Hat Opa einen Anzug an? (Is Grandpa Wearing a Suit?) by Amelie Fried (text), Jacky Gleich (illustration), ISBN 3-446-19076-7
- Children's book: Zwischen zwei Scheiben Gluck (Between Two Seasons of Happiness) by Irene Dische, ISBN 3-423-62070-6
- Young adult book: Bloße Hände (Bare Hands) by Bart Moeyaert (text), Rotraut Susanne Berner (illustration), ISBN 3-407-78804-5
- Non-fiction book: Haus der Kunst by Susanna Partsch, ISBN 3-423-62014-5
- Special Prize for Writing: Peter Hacks

1997

- Picture book: Du groß, und ich klein by Grégoire Solotareff, ISBN 3-407-76008-6
- Children's book: Karel, Jarda und das wahre Leben by Sheila Och, ISBN 3-401-02354-3
- Young adult Book: So Lonely by Per Nilsson, ISBN 3-423-78134-3
- Non-fiction book: Königskinder. Eine wahre Liebe (Paper Kisses: A True Love Story) by Reinhard Kaiser, ISBN 3-596-80316-0
- Special prize for Illustration: Binette Schroeder

1996

- Picture book: Feuerland ist viel zu heiß! by Anna Höglund, ISBN 3-551-51526-3
- Children's book: Als die Welt noch jung war (When the World Was New) by Jürg Schubiger (text), Rotraut Susanne Berner (illustration), ISBN 3-407-78393-0
- Young adult book: Winterbucht by Mats Wahl, ISBN 3-407-78790-1
- Non-fiction book: Rot, Blau und ein bißchen Gelb by Bjørn Sortland (text), Lars Elling (illustration), ISBN 3-451-70140-5
- Special prize for Writing: Paul Maar

1995

- Picture book: Detektiv John Chatterton (Detective John Chatterton) by Yvan Pommaux, ISBN 3-407-76029-9
- Children's book: Wenn das Glück kommt, muß man ihm einen Stuhl hinstellen by Mirjam Pressler, ISBN 3-407-78293-4
- Young adult book: Du fehlst mir, du fehlst mir! (I Miss You, I Miss You!) by Peter Pohl / Kinna Gieth, ISBN 3-423-62012-9
- Non-fiction book: Die Zeit ist kaputt by Klaus Kordon, ISBN 3-407-80729-5
- Special prize for Illustration: Klaus Ensikat

1994

- Picture book: Macker by David Hughes
- Children's book: Kannst du pfeifen Johanna? (Can You Whistle Johanna?) by Ulf Stark (text), Anna Höglund (illustration), ISBN 3-551-35114-7
- Young adult book: Sofies Welt (Sophie's World) by Jostein Gaarder, ISBN 3-423-12555-1
- Non-fiction book: Anne Frank by Ruud vaan der Rol / Rian Verhoeven, ISBN 90-384-0497-2
- Special prize for Translation: Mirjam Pressler

1993

- Picture book: Das Bärenwunder (The Miracle of the Bears) by Wolf Erlbruch, ISBN 3-87294-826-1
- Children's book: Der Hund, der unterwegs zum Stern war (A Bridge to the Stars) by Henning Mankell, ISBN 3-7891-4203-4
- Young adult book: Jack by A. M. Homes, ISBN 1-86207-689-8
- Non-fiction book: Safari ins Reich der Sterne by Helmut Hornung, ISBN 3-7891-3701-4
- Special prize for Lyric Poetry: Josef Guggenmos

1992

- Picture book: Die Reise nach Ugri-La-Brek by Thomas Tidholm (text), Anna-Clara Tidholm (illustration), ISBN 3-407-80383-4
- Children's book: Siebenstorch by Benno Pludra (text), Johannes K.G. Niedlich (illustration), ISBN 3-407-78599-2
- Young adult book: Kariuki und sein weißer Freund (Little White Man) by Meja Mwangi, ISBN 3-423-78098-3
- Non-fiction book: Linsen, Lupen und magische Skope by Pelle Eckerman (text), Sven Nordqvist (illustration), ISBN 3-7891-3401-5

1991

- Picture book: eins, fünf, viele (One, Five, Many) by Kveta Pacovská, ISBN 3-473-33569-X
- Children's book: Taube Klara by Wolf Spillner, ISBN 3-7817-1943-X
- Young adult book: Wir Kuckuckskinder by Anatoli Pristawkin, ISBN 3-353-00765-2
- Non-fiction book: Die eiserne Lerche by Michail Krausnick, ISBN 3-407-78773-1
- Special prize for Writing: Ursula Wölfel

1990

- Picture book: Aufstand der Tiere oder die Neuen Stadtmusikanten by Jörg Steiner (text), Jörg Müller (illustration), ISBN 3-7941-3103-7
- Children's book: Rennschwein Rudi Rüssel by Uwe Timm (text), Gunnar Matysiak (illustration), ISBN 3-423-70285-0
- Young adult book: Jan, mein Freund (Johnny, My Friend) by Peter Pohl, ISBN 3-473-54318-7
- Non-fiction book: Wie kommt der Wald ins Buch? by Irmgard Lucht, ISBN 3-7707-6295-9
- Non-fiction book: Meines Bruders Hüter (My Brother's Keeper: The Holocaust Through the Eyes of an Artist) by Israel Bernbaum, ISBN 3-8090-2439-2

=== 1980–1989 ===
1989

- Picture book: Papa wohnt jetzt in der Heinrichstraße by Nele Maar (text), Verena Ballhaus (illustration), ISBN 3-927401-01-3
- Children's book: Die Zeit der geheimen Wünsche by Iva Procházková (text), Peter Knorr (illustration), ISBN 3-407-80194-7
- Young adult book: Zeit für die Hora by Ingeborg Bayer, ISBN 3-401-02582-1
- Young adult book: Samuel Tillerman, der Läufer (The Runner) by Cynthia Voigt, ISBN 3-7941-3047-2

1988

- Picture book: Abschied von Rune (Goodbye Rune) by Marit Kaldhol (text), Wenche Øyen (illustration), ISBN 3-7707-6272-X
- Children's book: Deesje macht das schon by Joke van Leeuwen, ISBN 3-407-78172-5
- Young adult book: Die Wolke by Gudrun Pausewang, ISBN 3-473-54054-4
- Non-fiction book: Linnéa im Garten des Malers by Christina Björk (text), Lena Anderson (illustration), ISBN 3-570-07830-2
- Non-fiction book: Türme by Paul Maar, ISBN 3-86751-111-X

1987

- Picture book: Du hast angefangen! Nein, du! (Two Monsters) by David McKee, ISBN 3-7941-5008-2
- Children's book: Oma und ich by Achim Bröger, ISBN 3-312-00708-9
- Young adult book: Briefe an die Königin der Nacht by Inger Edelfeldt, ISBN 3-423-78003-7

1986

- Picture book: Ich komm dich holen! (I'm coming to get you!) by Tony Ross, ISBN 3-522-43413-7
- Children's book: Die wundersame Reise der kleinen Sofie (Little Sophie and Lanky Flop) by Els Pelgrom, ISBN 3-423-70154-4
- Young adult book: Lady Punk by Dagmar Chidolue, ISBN 3-407-78711-1
- Non-fiction book: Für fremde Kaiser und kein Vaterland by Klas Ewert Everwyn, ISBN 3-7891-1224-0

1985

- Picture book: Mein Papi, nur meiner!(The Visitors Who Came to Stay) by Anthony Browne / Annalena MacAfee, ISBN 3-922723-35-7
- Children's book: Sophiechen und der Riese (The BFG) by Roald Dahl, ISBN 3-499-20582-3
- Young adult book: Treffpunkt Weltzeituhr by Isolde Heyne, ISBN 3-401-01672-5

1984

- Picture book: Mäusemärchen – Riesengeschichte (Giant Story/Mouse Tale) by Annegert Fuchshuber, ISBN 3-522-41850-6
- Children's book: Sonntagskind (Sunday's Child) by Gudrun Mebs, ISBN 3-7941-2443-X
- Young adult book: In dreihundert Jahren vielleicht by Tilman Röhrig, ISBN 3-401-01850-7

1983

- Children's book: Der Weg durch die Wand by Robert Gernhardt/ Almut Gernhardt, ISBN 3-458-14049-2
- Young adult book: Ganesh oder eine neue Welt (Ganesh) by Malcolm J. Bosse, ISBN 3-423-07850-2

1982

- Picture book: Selina, Pumpernickel und die Katze Flora (Selina, the Mouse and the Giant Cat) by Susi Bohdal, ISBN 3-314-00146-0
- Children's book: Erzähl mir von Oma by Guus Kuijer, ISBN 3-473-51560-4
- Young adult book: Der gelbe Vogel by Myron Levoy, ISBN 3-423-07842-1
- Non-fiction book: Von feinen und von kleinen Leuten by Cornelia Julius, ISBN 3-407-84015-2

1981

- Picture book: Die Reise mit der Jolle by Margaret Rettich, ISBN 3-473-33850-8
- Children's book: Drunter und drüber by Jürgen Spohn, ISBN 3-551-35334-4
- Young adult book: Der lange Weg des Lukas B. by Willi Fährmann, ISBN 3-401-03888-5
- Non-fiction book: Das kurze Leben der Sophie Scholl (The short life of Sophie Scholl) by Hermann Vinke, ISBN 3-473-58011-2

1980

- Picture book: Was ist dir lieber ... (Would you rather?) by John Burningham, ISBN 3-7941-5094-5
- Children's book: Emma oder die unruhige Zeit by Ursula Fuchs, ISBN 3-7891-0698-4
- Young adult book: Johanna by Renate Welsh, ISBN 3-499-20293-X

=== 1970–1979 ===
1979

- Picture book: Oh, wie schön ist Panama (The Trip to Panama) by Janosch, ISBN 3-407-76006-X
- Children's book: Die Nachtvögel by Tormud Haugen, ISBN 3-423-07420-5

1978

- Picture book: Der große Rutsch (The Long Slide) by Ray and Catriona Smith, ISBN 3-7941-1584-8
- Children's book: Servus Opa, sagte ich leise by Elfie Donnelly, ISBN 3-423-70024-6
- Young adult book: Der Bleisiegelfälscher by Dietlof Reiche, ISBN 3-89106-252-4
- Non-fiction book: Nest am Fenster (Window into a Nest) by Geraldine Lux Flanagan and Sean Morris, ISBN 3-551-20901-4

1977

- Picture book: Schorschi schrumpft (The Shrinking of Treehorn) by Edward Gorey / Florence P. Heide, ISBN 3-257-25030-4
- Children's book: Wo die Füchse Blockflöte spielen by Ludvík Aškenazy, ISBN 3-473-38723-1
- Young adult book: Ich bin Fedde by An Rutgers, ISBN 3-7891-1585-1
- Non-fiction book: Eskimos by Wally Herbert, ISBN 0-531-02124-6

1976

- Picture book: Heute wünsche ich mir ein Nilpferd by Wilhelm Schlote, ISBN 3-458-05754-4
- Children's book: Oma by Peter Härtling, ISBN 0-06-022237-9
- Young adult book: Die Wächter (The Guardians) by John Christopher, ISBN 3-473-58027-9
- Non-fiction book: Planet des Menschen by Theodor Dolezol, ISBN 3-8000-3128-0

1975

- Picture book: Wir können noch viel zusammen machen by F. K. Waechter, ISBN 3-257-01110-5
- Young adult book: Julie von den Wölfen (Julie of the Wolves) by Jean Craighead George, ISBN 3-7941-0702-0
- Non-fiction book: Sie bauten eine Kathedrale (Cathedral: The Story of its Construction) by David Macaulay, ISBN 3-423-79500-X

1974

- Picture book: Alle Jahre wieder saust der Preßlufthammer nieder by Jörg Müller, ISBN 3-7941-0218-5
- Children's book: Als Hitler das rosa Kaninchen stahl (When Hitler Stole Pink Rabbit) by Judith Kerr, ISBN 3-473-38600-6
- Young adult book: Momo by Michael Ende, ISBN 0-14-007773-1
- Non-fiction book: Tausend Tricks der Tarnung (Animal camouflage) by Otto von Frisch, ISBN 3-8002-2526-3

1973

- Picture book: Große dürfen alles (If I were a Grown-up) by László Réber/ Éva Janikovszky, ISBN 3-89603-210-0
- Children's book: Wir pfeifen auf den Gurkenkönig (The Cucumber King) by Christine Nöstlinger, ISBN 3-499-20153-4
- Young adult book: Ein nützliches Mitglied der Gesellschaft (Run softly, go fast) by Barbara Wersba, ISBN 3-473-38937-4
- Non-fiction book: Ich habe sieben Leben by Frederik Hetmann, ISBN 3-499-20137-2

1972

- Children's book: Geh und spiel mit dem Riesen by Hans-Joachim Gelberg (Published), ISBN 3-407-78085-0
- Young adult book: Krabat (The Satanic Mill) by Otfried Preußler, ISBN 3-423-25087-9
- Non-fiction book: Höhlen – Welt ohne Sonne (Mysterious World of Caves) by Ernst W. Bauer, ISBN 3-215-40013-8

1971

- Picture book: Der Apfel und der Schmetterling (The Apple and the Butterfly) by Iela and Enzo Mari, ISBN 3-89565-205-9
- Children's book: Der Löwe Leopold by Reiner Kunze, ISBN 3-596-80161-3
- Young adult book: Die Erde ist nah (The Earth is Near) by Ludek Pesek, ISBN 3-7903-0000-4
- Non-fiction book: Gesellschaft und Staat by Hanno Drechsler (Published), ISBN 3-7971-0079-5

1970

- Picture book: Kunterbunter Schabernack by Wilfried Blecher, ISBN 3-423-07105-2
- Young adult book: Der Bruder des schweigenden Wolfes by Klára Jarunková, ISBN 3-7891-1917-2
- Non-fiction book: Der Mann, der überlebte (George Washington Carver: the man who overcame) by Lawrence Elliott, ISBN 3-7615-5100-2

=== 1960–1969 ===
1969

- Picture book: Rundherum in meiner Stadt (Round and Round in my Town) by Ali Mitgutsch, ISBN 3-473-30680-0
- Children's book: Zlateh, die Geiß und andere Geschichten (Zlateh the Goat and Other Stories) by Isaac B. Singer, ISBN 3-491-24095-6
- Young adult book: Es lebe die Republik (Long live the Republic; All about me, and Julie, and the end of the Great War) by Jan Procházka, ISBN 3-612-26705-1

1968

- Picture book: Die Wichtelmänner (The Elves and the Shoemaker) by Katrin Brandt, ISBN 0-370-00782-4
- Children's book: Die Zwölf vom Dachboden (The Twelve and the Genii) by Pauline Clarke, ISBN 3-7891-1557-6
- Young adult book: Der Sohn des Toreros (The Shadow of the Bull) by Maia Rodman, ISBN 3-401-01472-2
- Non-fiction book: ... und unter uns die Erde by Erich H. Heimann, ISBN 3-440-03503-4

1967

- Picture book: Der goldene Vogel (The Golden Bird) by Lilo Fromm/ Jacob Grimm, ISBN 3-7707-6015-8
- Children's book: Achtung – Sturmwarnung Hurricane (Hurricane) by Andrew Salkey, ISBN 3-522-11100-1
- Young adult book: Im roten Hinterhaus by Peter Berger, ISBN 3-401-02502-3
- Non-fiction book: Das Rätsel Nordwestpassage by Kurt Lütgen, ISBN 3-401-02133-8

1966

- Picture book: Wo ist Wendelin? (Where is Peterkin) by Wilfried Blecher, ISBN 3-407-80002-9
- Children's book: David by Max Bolliger, ISBN 0-333-04356-1
- Young adult book: Florian 14: Achter Alarm by Hans G. Prager, ISBN 3-87547-176-8

1965

- Picture book: Swimmy by Leo Lionni, ISBN 0-590-43049-1
- Children's book: Wickie und die starken Männer (Vicky the Viking) by Runer Jonsson, ISBN 3-7707-2850-5
- Young adult book: Amerika-Saga by Frederik Hetmann, ISBN 3-7891-1564-9

1964

- Children's book: Delphinensommer (Golden Island) by Katherine Allfrey, ISBN 3-7915-0121-6
- Young adult book: ... und viele Grüße von Wancho by Miep Diekmann, ISBN 3-401-01390-4

1963

- Children's book: Kater Mikesch (Purrkin, the talking cat) by Josef Lada, ISBN 3-7941-6001-0
- Young adult book: Insel der blauen Delphine (Island of the Blue Dolphins) by Scott O'Dell, ISBN 3-86072-798-2

1962

- Children's book: Feuerschuh und Windsandale (Tim Fireshoe) by Ursula Wölfel, ISBN 3-522-17062-8
- Young adult book: Sternkinder (Star children) by Clara Asscher-Pinkhof, ISBN 3-7891-0696-8

1961

- Children's book: Jim Knopf und Lukas der Lokomotivführer (Jim Button and Luke the Engine Driver) by Michael Ende, ISBN 3-522-43561-3

1960

- Children's book: Mein Urgroßvater und ich (My Great Grandfather and I) by James Krüss, ISBN 3-7891-1566-5
- Young adult book: Schanghai 41 (To Beat a Tiger) by Elizabeth F. Lewis

=== 1956–1959 ===
1959

- Children's book: Matthias und das Eichhörnchen (Magnus and the squirrel) by Hans Peterson, ISBN 3-7891-0713-1
- Special prize: Latte Igel und der Wasserstein by Sebastian Lybeck, ISBN 3-423-07089-7

1958

- Picture book: Kasimirs Weltreise by Marlene Reidel, ISBN 3-219-10208-5
- Children's book: Jan und das Wildpferd (Jan and the Wild Horse) by Heinrich M. Denneborg, ISBN 3-7891-0700-X
- Young adult book: Roter Mond und Heiße Zeit (Red Moon and High Summer) by Herbert Kaufmann, ISBN 3-401-02501-5

1957

- Children's book: Das Rad auf der Schule (The Wheel on the School) by Meindert DeJong, ISBN 3-7891-1223-2
- Young adult book: Faß zu, Toyon (Toyon, a dog of the North and his people) by Nicholas Kalashnikoff, ISBN 0-06-012241-2
- Non-fiction book: Pioniere und ihre Enkel (Children on the Oregon Trail) by An Rutgers, ISBN 3-7891-1561-4

1956

- Children's book: Der glückliche Löwe (Happy Lion) by Roger Duvoisin/Louise Fatio, ISBN 3-451-70578-8
- Young adult book: Kein Winter für Wölfe (Two Against the Arctic: Story of a Restless Life between Greenland and Alaska) by Kurt Lütgen, ISBN 3-7891-1222-4
- Children's book: Mio, mein Mio (Mio, My Son) by Astrid Lindgren, ISBN 3-7891-4167-4
