= Abarbanell =

Abarbanell (a variant spelling of Abarbanel) is a surname. Notable people with the surname include:

- Bettina Abarbanell (born 1961), German literary translator
- Jacob Ralph Abarbanell (1852–1922), American lawyer, writer, and playwright
- Lina Abarbanell (1879–1963), German-American opera singer
