= Mühle =

Mühle, Muehle, is an occupational surname related to the occupation of miller and literally means "mill". Notable people with the surname include:

- Jörg Mühle, German freelance illustrator, and author of children's books
- Wilhelm Mühle, the namesake of the historical Mühle House, Romania
- Founders and owners of Mühle Glashütte, German watchmaker
