= Farvel =

Farvel may refer to:

- "Farvel", a 2016 song by Jimilian
- Farvel, a 2017 album by Gulddreng
- "Farvel", a 2012 song by Node and Gilli
- Philip Kovolick (1908–c. 1971), New York mobster known as Joseph Farvel
- Farvel, Rune, a 1986 book by Marit Kaldhol
