= Kaldhol =

Kaldhol is a Norwegian surname. Notable people with the surname include:

- Marit Kaldhol (born 1955), Norwegian poet and children's writer
- Ottar Kaldhol (born 1946), Norwegian politician
