= Renate Habinger =

Austrian graphic artist and illustrator (born 1957)

Renate Habinger (born 11 August 1957, in Sankt Pölten) is an Austrian graphic artist and illustrator. Habinger studied graphic design at the Federal Institute of Graphic Arts and Design (1971–1975) and since then, she has been working as a freelance artist. In 1997, she set up the workshop the "Schneiderhäusl" in Oberndorf an der Melk.

== Biography ==
Renate Habinger studied graphic design at the Higher Federal Graphic Arts Training and Research Institute from 1971 to 1975 and has worked as a freelance artist ever since. In 1997, she established a paper workshop, the "Schneiderhäusl," in Oberndorf an der Melk, where she has since offered papermaking workshops for children, teenagers, and adults. The summer school for children's book illustration has been held there annually since 2008. The Children's Book House in the Schneiderhäusl was opened on August 10, 2013. In 2019, the Children's Book House in the Schneiderhäusl was awarded the Special Prize of the Lower Austrian Culture Prize (Recognition Prize).

== Awards ==
- 1993: Most Beautiful Book in Austria for Meistererzählungen von Hans Christian Andersen
- 2000: Illustration Prize at the Austrian Children and Youth Book Prize for Es war einmal von A bis Zett (by Linda Wolfsgruber)
- 2000: Luchs des Monats 159 for Es war einmal von A bis Zett
- 2004: Nomination for the Deutscher Jugendliteraturpreis (German Youth Literature Prize) for Neun nackte Nilpferddamen (by Gerda Anger-Schmidt)
- 2005: Nomination for Leserstimmen for Neun nackte Nilpferddamen (by Gerda Anger-Schmidt)
- 2005: Illustration Prize at the Children's Book Prize of Vienna for Unser König trug nie eine Krone (by Gerda Anger-Schmidt)
- 2006: Mira Lobe Scholarship
- 2007: Austrian State Prize for Children's and Youth Literature for Gaggalagu (together with Michael Stavarič)
- 2009: Austrian State Prize for Children's and Youth Literature for Biebu (together with Michael Stavarič)
- 2012: Nomination for the Hans Christian Andersen Award for her complete works
- 2012: Austrian State Prize for Children's and Youth Literature for Lions (together with Michael Stavarič)
- 2013: Biennial of Illustrations Bratislava (BIB) 2013: BIB Plaque
