= Jutta Richter =

German author

- Born: 30 September 1955 (age 70); Burgsteinfurt, Westfalen, Germany
- Occupation: Author
- Partner: Rald Thenior
- Website: http://www.juttarichter.de/

Jutta Richter (born 30 September 1955 in Burgsteinfurt, Westfalen, Germany) is a German author of children's and youth literature.

Richter spent her youth in the Ruhr and Sauerland and at the age of 15 she spent a year in Detroit (USA). There she wrote her first book, so as not to forget her native language, and published the book whilst still a schoolgirl.

After studying Theology, German and Communication in Münster she has worked since 1978 as a freelance writer at Schloss Westerwinkel in Ascheberg and in Lucca (Tuscany).

Jutta Richter married the German author Ralf Thenior.

== Awards ==
- 2000 "Rattenfänger-Literaturpreis" for Der Hund mit dem gelben Herzen oder Die Geschichte vom Gegenteil
- 2000 "LUCHS des Jahres" for Der Tag, als ich lernte die Spinnen zu zähmen
- 2001 "Internationaler UNESCO-Preis" Nomination for Der Hund mit dem gelben Herzen
- 2001 Deutscher Jugendliteraturpreis for Der Tag, als ich lernte die Spinnen zu zähmen
- 2004 "LUCHS" book of the month August for Hechtsommer
- 2004 "LesePeter" Septembre for Hechtsommer
- 2005 "Katholischer Kinder- und Jugendbuchpreis" for Hechtsommer
- 2006 Deutschlandfunk – "Die besten 7 Bücher für junge Leser" in November 2006 for Die Katze oder Wie ich die Ewigkeit verloren habe
- 2007 "Premio Andersen" (Italian children's literature award) for Die Katze oder Wie ich die Ewigkeit verloren habe
- 2008 Mildred L. Batchelder Award for Die Katze oder Wie ich die Ewigkeit verloren habe

== Bibliography ==
- Popcorn und Sternenbanner. Diary of a student exchange, 1975
- Die Puppenmütter, 1980
- Das Geraniengefängnis, 1980
- Die heilste Welt der Welt. Ein Jahr im Leben der Familie Feuerstein, 1984
- Gib mir einen Kuß, Frau Nuß!, 1984
- Was machen wir jetzt? Oder die seltsamen Abenteuer der gelben Kanalratte und des karierten Meerschweinchens, 1985
- Himmel, Hölle, Fegefeuer. Versuch einer Befreiung, 1985
- Das Tontilon, 1986
- Und jeden Samstag baden. Geschichten von früher, 1987
- Prinz Neumann oder Andere Kinder heißen wie ihr Vater, 1987
- Satemin Seidenfuß. Eine Liebesgeschichte, 1988
- Annabella Klimperauge. Geschichten aus dem Kinderzimmer. Carl Hanser Verlag, 1989
  - Annabelle la rebelle. La Joie de lire, 2004
- Der Sommer schmeckt wie Himbeereis. Gedichte und Reime für Große und Kleine, 1990
- Hexenwald und Zaubersocken, 1993
- Der Hund mit dem gelben Herzen oder Die Geschichte vom Gegenteil, 1998
  - Le chien au coeur jaune. La Joie de lire, 2000
  - Il cane dal cuore giallo o la storia dei contrari. Beisler edizione, 2003
- Herr Oska und das Zirr, 1998
- Es lebte ein Kind auf den Bäumen, 1999
- In der allerlängsten Nacht, 1999
- Verlass mich nicht zur Kirschenzeit. Liebesgedichte, 2000
- Der Tag, als ich lernte die Spinnen zu zähmen. Carl Hanser Verlag, 2000
  - Ce jour-là j'ai apprivoisé les araignées. La Joie de lire, 2002
  - Quando imparai ad addomesticare i ragni. Salani, 2003
- Hinter dem Bahnhof liegt das Meer. Carl Hanser Verlag, 2001
  - Derrière la gare, il y à la mer. La Joie de lire, 2003
  - Tutti i sogni portano al mare. Beisler edizione, 2004
- An einem großen stillen See, 2003
  - Un soir, près d'un lac tranquille. La Joie de lire, 2004
- Hechtsommer, Carl Hanser Verlag, 2004
  - L'été du brochet. La Joie de lire, 2006
  - The summer of the pike. Milkweed Editions, 2006
  - Un'estate di quelle che non finiscono mai. Salani, 2006
- Die Katze oder Wie ich die Ewigkeit verloren habe, 2006
  - Il gatto Venerdì. Beisler edizione, 2006
  - The Cat Or How I lost eternity. Milkweed Editions, 2007
- Sommer und Bär. Eine Liebesgeschichte, 2006
- All das wünsch ich dir, 2007
- Der Anfang von allem. Carl Hanser Verlag, 2008

== Literature ==
- Bruno Blume: Erinnerungen an eine verlorene Kindheit. Versuch einer umfassenden Rezension. In: Bulletin Jugend und Literatur. Geesthacht, 32, H. 2, 2001, p. 21
- Christoph Meckel: Plagiat oder Lärm um nichts? Die Debatte um Jutta Richters "Hinter dem Bahnhof liegt das Meer". Eine Dokumentation. In: Bulletin Jugend und Literatur. Geesthacht, 33, H. 3, 2002. p. 7-9, 29-30.
- Juliane Schier: Jutta Richter. Kinder- und Jugendbuchautorin. Leben und Werke. Dortmund: Univ. Hausarb. 1999.
