= Deborah Froese =

Canadian writer

Deborah Froese (born 1957) is a Canadian Mennonite writer from Winnipeg, Manitoba.

== Career ==
Between 1979 and 1989, Froese worked as an audio-visual producer and photographer at VIP Communications Ltd. in Winnipeg. In 1994, she participated in the Manitoba Writers' Guild Mentorship Program, which led her toward writing; her first book, The Wise Washerman, was published two years later. From 2007 to 2017, Froese was Mennonite Church Canada's news services director. Between 2014 and 2017, she was an editorial director at Rebelight Publishing Incorporated, after which she became self-employed as a writer, editor, writing coach, and writing instructor.

== Awards and honours ==
- 2003: Selected for the American Library Association's Best Books for Young Adults list for Out of the Fire.
- 2003: Named an honour book in the Manitoba Young Readers' Choice Awards for Out of the Fire.
- 2004–2005: Nominated for the South Carolina Young Adult Book Award for Out of the Fire.
- 2005: Nominated for the youth jury prize at the Deutscher Jugendliteraturpreis for In meiner Haut, the German translation of Out of the Fire, translated by Birgitt Kollmann.
- 2015: Shortlisted for the McNally Robinson Book for Young People Award, younger readers category, for Mr. Jacobson's Window.
- The Wise Washerman: A Folktale from Burma received Our Choice recognition from the Canadian Children's Book Centre.

== Works ==
=== Children's and young adult books ===
- The Wise Washerman: A Folktale from Burma (1996), illustrated by Wang Kui. Hyperion Press.
- Out of the Fire (2001). Sumach Press.
- Mr. Jacobson's Window (2014), written and illustrated by Froese. Peanut Butter Press.

=== Edited books ===
- Entrepreneurship for Leaders: 10 Success Keys to Elevate You to the Next Level (2023). Indigo River Publishing.
- Strategic Growth for Leaders: 10 Success Keys to Elevate You to the Next Level (2024). Indigo River Publishing.
- Marketing for Leaders: 11 Keys to Building Trust, Clarity, and Connection in a Noisy World (2026). Indigo River Publishing.

=== Articles in Canadian Mennonite ===
- "Thelma Meade: 'I know where I go': An Aboriginal elder's experience with the church," in Vision: A Journal for Church and Theology (2010)
- "What is the Spirit writing on our hearts?" (2017)
- "It's all about trust" (2017)
- "Meta-morphosis" (2017)
- "How to avoid 'a tense faith’" (2017)
- "Mennonite helps Lutherans commemorate the Reformation" (2017)
- "Celebrating a legacy of respect" (2017)
- "A new song for Special Assembly 2017" (2017)
- "Supporting women's education with a party and a quilt" (2017)
- "Canada 150: Facing the long divide" (2017)
- "Prosthetic limb leads to new hope for Syrian refugee" (2017)
- "Donations sought to send youth to special delegate assembly" (2017)
- "An idea worth sharing" (2017)
- "Film on COs wins awards and attention" (2016)
- "Assembly 2016 resolution about more than BDS" (2016)

== Personal ==
Froese was born in Winnipeg in 1957 in and attended the University of Manitoba. She currently lives in Manitoba with her husband and three sons. They are members of First Mennonite Church of Winnipeg, where Froese teaches Sunday school classes.
