= Tamara Bach =

German writer (born 1976)

- Born: January 18, 1976 (age 50); Limburg an der Lahn, Hesse, Germany
- Education: Free University of Berlin
- Occupation: Writer
- Writing career
- Language: German
- Genre: Young adult literature
- Notable works: Girl from Mars, Busfahrt mit Kuhn, Jetzt ist hier
- Notable awards: Luchs Prize (2003, 2007); German Youth Literature Prize (2004)

Tamara Bach (born January 18, 1976, in Limburg an der Lahn, Hesse) is a German writer.

== Life ==
Tamara Bach was born in Limburg an der Lahn in 1976 and grew up in Ludwigshöhe, Rhineland-Palatinate. She was encouraged in her writing by her then German teacher, Peter Grosz. In 1993 and 1995 she took part in the prestigious meeting of young writers, where she earned an award. After finishing school in 1995, she went to Derry, Northern Ireland as an au pair. She began as a student in Mainz in 1996, but after three semesters she moved to Berlin. She has lived there since 1997, studying German and English at the Free University and completing her studies in early 2006. In addition to her studies, she worked for television and has developed youth plays.

Her first book was Girl from Mars, published in Germany in 2003. It won several awards, including the Luchs prize for September, 2003, and the German youth literature prize for the best youth book in 2004. She followed this with Busfahrt mit Kuhn in 2004, and Jetzt ist hier in 2007, which won the Luchs prize for 2007.

== Works ==
- Marsmädchen: Roman, Deutscher Taschenbuch-Verlag, 2005, ISBN 9783423782050
  - Translator Shelley Tanaka, Girl from Mars, Toronto: Groundwood Books, 2009, ISBN 978-0-88899-725-8
  - Fran en annan planet: Roman, Bergh, 2005, ISBN 9789150215410
- Busfahrt mit Kuhn, F. Oetinger, 2004, ISBN 9783789131561; DTV Deutscher Taschenbuch, 2007, ISBN 3-423-78216-1
  - Translator Solveig Rasmussen En tid för allting, Bergh, 2006, ISBN 9789150216226
- Jetzt ist hier, Oetinger Friedrich GmbH, 2007, ISBN 9783789131691
