= Miriam Shatal =

Dutch-Israeli composer (1903–2006)

Miriam Shatal (Hebrew: מרים שטל; December 12, 1903 – November 27, 2006) was a Dutch-Israeli biologist, painter and composer of choral works.

== Early life and education ==
Shatal was born in Amsterdam, Netherlands, as Marianne Schifra "Jannie" Pinkhof. Miriam was the sister of Clara Asscher-Pinkhof, who went on to become a successful author of children's books. In 1929, Marianne obtained a PhD in biology from the University of Amsterdam. In Germany in the 1930s, Marianne attempted to mediate conflict in the Zionist movements that was occurring between Erich Rosenblüth and the youth movement led by Henrietta Szold.

In 1948 she moved to Israel, and in 1949 to the city of Beersheba. She adopted the Hebrew first name of Miriam. In 1951 she joined a new choir in which she participated until 1985. In 1956 she started composing for her choir and beginning in 1968 she also painted. Shatal took composition lessons with Haim Alexander, Paul Ben-Haim and Arthur Geidrun.

== Personal life and legacy ==
In 1930, Marianne Pinkhof married Dr. Isidor "Ies" (Hebrew name: Yitzhak) Spangenthal, also from Amsterdam, with whom she had seven children. Yitzhak, who became a physician in Beersheba, hebraized their surname to Shatal. In 1988, Miriam Shatal received the beloved resident award from the Municipality of Beersheba, also for supporting Dr. Yitzhak Shatal in providing medical care under very difficult conditions. Shatal's correspondence with Paul Ben-Haim is archived at the National Library of Israel. Shatal's music was published by the Israel Music Institute.

== Compositions ==
Shatal's vocal compositions include:

- Al Har Gawoah (adapted for mixed chorus by M. Lushig)
- “Echo”
- El Artsie (women's chorus)
- Four Ballads (voice and guitar)
- Heed (women's chorus)
- I Call Upon Thee (Hishba'ti Etchen; a cappella women's chorus)
- Kina (women's chorus and violin)
- May Peace Be With You (Shalom Aleichem; a cappella mixed chorus)
- “Prayer”
- Psalm 104 Verse 4 (Barchie Nafshi; mixed chorus)
- “Psalm 133 Verse 3” (Ketal Chermon)
