= Annika Thor =

Swedish author and screenwriter

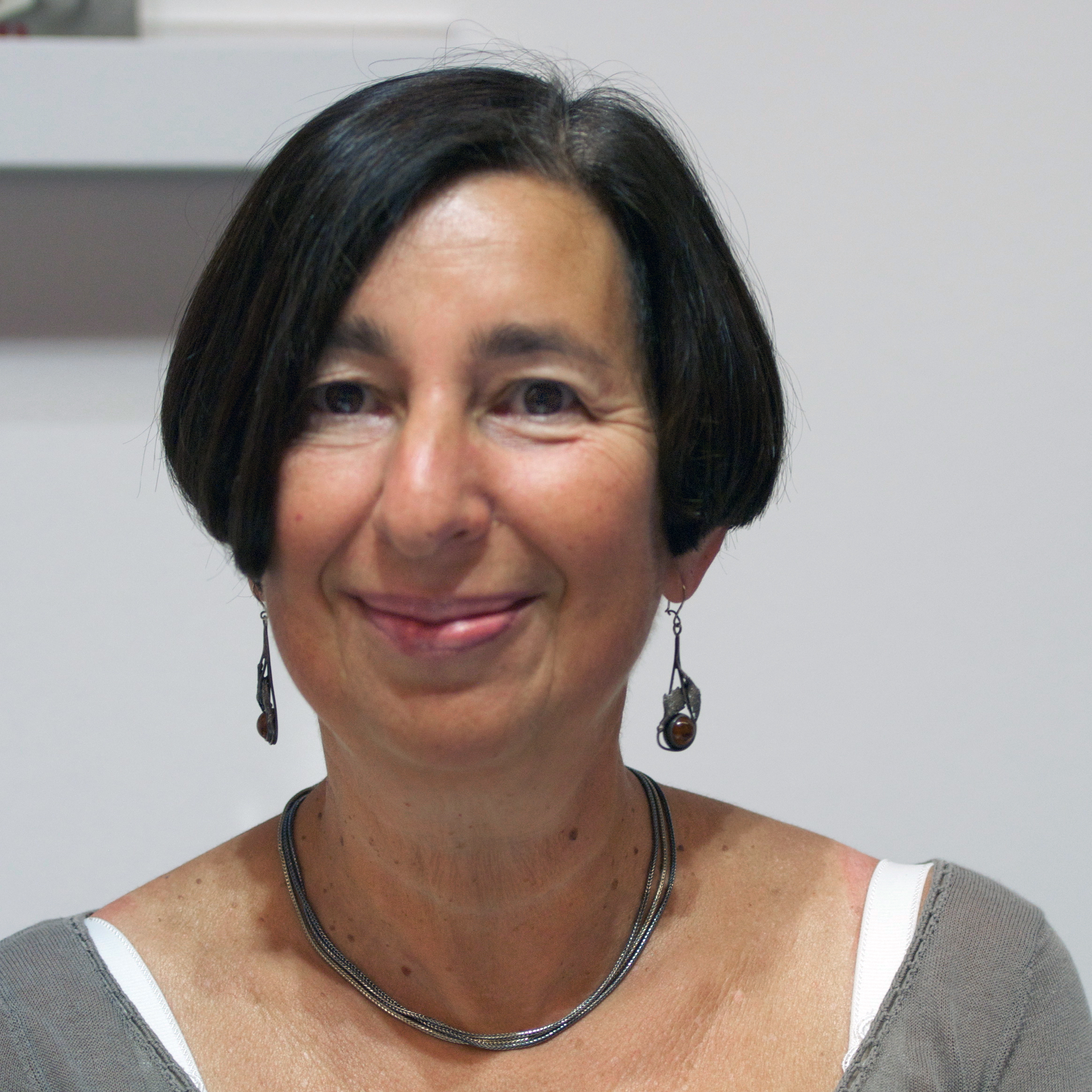
- Born: 2 July 1950 (age 76); Gothenburg

Annika Thor (born 2 July 1950) is a Swedish author and screenwriter from Sweden who has won the August Prize for Truth or Dare in 1997.

== Life ==
Thor was born into Jewish family in Gothenburg. She has worked as a librarian, a novelist, screenwriter and as a journalist. She has won the August Prize for the children's story Truth or Dare in 1997 and the German state award for children's fiction (Deutscher Jugendliteraturpreis) also for A Faraway Island in 1999.

She wrote a novel about Jewish children who escaped the Holocaust to live on an island in Sweden. This is called Faraway Island in English and Thor has written three sequels, Lily Pond, Deep Sea and Open Sea. She has written 15 books for children and teenagers, and three books for adults and they have been translated into 17 languages. Her most recent novel for adults, Om inte nu så när? (If not now, when?), appeared in 2011.

== Books ==
- Faraway Island (En ö i havet), translated from the Swedish by Linda Schenck in 2009, published by Random House in 2009
- Lily Pond (Näckrosdammen), translated from the Swedish by Linda Schenck in 2011
- Deep Sea (Havets djup), translated from the Swedish by Linda Schenck in 2015
- Open Sea (Öppet hav)
- Lighthouse and the Stars (Fyr och stjärnor)
- Truth or Dare (Sanning eller konsekvens)
- If Not Now, When? (Om inte nu så när?)
