= Jutta Bauer =

German children's illustrator and writer (1955–2025)

Jutta Bauer (9 January 1955 – 10 September 2025) was a German writer and illustrator of children's books. She received the Hans Christian Andersen Medal in 2010 for her "lasting contribution" as a children's illustrator.

== Life and career ==
Born in Volksdorf, Hamburg on 9 January 1955, Bauer studied at the Technical College of Design in Hamburg from 1975 to 1981. Afterward, she worked as a children's book illustrator and as a cartoonist for women's magazine Brigitte.

She won the Deutscher Jugendliteraturpreis (German Youth Literature Award) in 2001 for Schreimutter, a picture book. She was a runner-up in 2002 for Opas Engel, a story inspired by schoolchildren outside her studio, and she received a special prize for Illustration in 2009.

In 2010, Bauer received the biennial Hans Christian Andersen Award, conferred by the International Board on Books for Young People. It is the highest recognition available to a writer or illustrator of children's books.

== Death ==
Bauer lived in Hamburg, and died unexpectedly of complications from an allergic reaction on 10 September 2025 at the age of 70.

== Selected works ==
- Ein Engel trägt meinen Hinkelstein
- Schreimutter – 2001 Deutscher Jugendliteraturpreis, Picture books
- Opas Engel; transl. Grandpa's Angel (Walker Books)
- Die Königin der Farben
- Abends, wenn ich schlafen geh
- Ich sitze hier im Abendlicht
- 2006 – Selma, 52pp., ISBN 0 9582720-8-5
- 2018 – Selma New Edition, 42pp., ISBN 978-1-776572-12-0
