= Éva Janikovszky =

Hungarian writer

Éva Janikovszky (April 23, 1926 in Szeged – July 14, 2003 in Budapest) was a Hungarian writer.

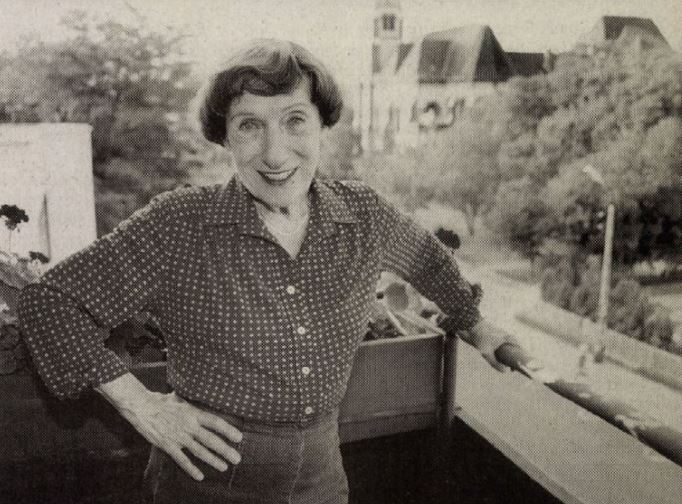
Janikovszky in 2001

She wrote novels for both children and adults, but she is primarily known for her children's books, translated into 35 languages. Her first book was published in 1957. Among her most famous picture books are If I Were a Grown-Up and Who Does This Kid Take After?

She won the Deutscher Jugendliteraturpreis in 1973.
