= Haim Alexander =

Israeli composer

Haim Alexander (Hebrew: חיים אלכסנדר; August 9, 1915 – March 18, 2012) an Israeli composer and music educator.

== Biography ==
Alexander was born in Berlin, Germany on August 9, 1915. He was a student at the Stern Conservatory in his native city but persecution from the Nazi Party forced him to leave in 1936. That same year he emigrated to Palestine. He studied piano and composition with Irma and Stefan Wolpe at the Jerusalem Academy of Music and Dance. While a student there he made a living playing jazz piano in cafés. He graduated from the academy in 1945.

Alexander joined the faculty of the Rubin Academy of Music and Dance in Jerusalem in 1945. He spent his entire career there where he taught a broad range of subjects that spanned from piano, harpsichord, music theory, music composition, improvisation, and musicology. In the latter subject, he worked as a visiting lecturer at several institutions during his career, including Tel-Aviv University, Hebrew University, the Institut Jaques-Dalcroze, the University of Geneva, and New York University. Composer Miriam Shatal was one of his students.

Alexander also did work transcribing tradition Jewish music into musical notation for at the National Sound Archives at the National Library of Israel in Jerusalem. He was the recipient of several awards, including the Engel Prize in 1956 and the Artur Rubinstein Prize in 1973. In 1996 he received the ACUM Golden Feather Prize for lifetime achievement.

Alexander died in Jerusalem on March 18, 2012.

== Selected works ==
- 6 Israeli Dances, fo piano, 1951
- Artza [To our Country], for orchestra, 1951
- Ve'kibatzti etkhem [I Will Even Gather You], for SATB chorus, 1952
- Bnot kol [Sound Figures], for piano, 1965
- Nabut, ballet, 1971
- Tavniot [Patterns], for piano, 1973; revised 1975
- Piano Concerto, for piano and orchestra, 1982
- Shirei Ahavah ve'Tzippia [Songs of Love and Expectation] (word by Litvin), for soprano and orchestra (1985)
- Metamorphoses on a Theme by Mozart, for piano, 1990
- Piano Sonata, 1994
- The West-Eastern Bridge, organ solo, 1998
