= Marlene Reidel =

German artist and author

- Born: Maria Magdalena Hartl; 20 December 1923; Landshut, Germany
- Died: 21 July 2014 (aged 90); Landshut, Germany
- Occupation: Artist

Marlene Reidel (née Maria Magdalena Hartl; 20 December 1923 – 21 July 2014) was a German artist known for illustrating and writing picture books. She worked on more than 100 books during her lifetime. In 1967, she won the German Children's Book Award for her book Kasimirs Weltreise.

== Biography ==
Reidel was born on 20 December 1923 in Landshut in Bavaria, Germany. She grew up on a farm in Lower Bavaria. She worked as an apprentice ceramicist at the Huber-Roethe ceramics workshop while young. After being drafted at the age of 18, she worked for the Reich Labour Service. In her free time from the Labour Service, Reidel worked on her art.

Beginning in 1943, she studied at the Academy of Fine Arts, Munich, alongside artists Hans Gött and Josef Oberberger. Her studies were paused due to the onset of World War II, and she resumed them at Schloss Haimhausen after the war's end.

Reidel illustrated a picture book with potato printing—using cut potatoes—around 1956. Her picture book, Kasimirs Weltreise, was published in 1957 by Munich-based publisher Georg Lentz. It was translated into English as Eric's Journey, and was published by Routledge in 1960. In 1958, she won the German Children's Book Award within the picture book category for her book Kasimirs Weltreise; it was the first time the award was given to a picture book. In 1959, the book was on the New York Times Best Illustrated Children's Book list.

In her book Kasimirs Weltreise, Reidel's artwork was made using linocuts, which she continued to use for her picture book illustrations. Her illustration style often used flat colors and angular shapes.

Her picture books were distributed by German publishers Annette Betz and Karl Thienemanns. Outside of illustration, Reidel worked on theatrical productions at the Deutsches Schauspielhaus in 1958 and 1962, and worked as a ceramicist. She also designed windows for the Catholic parish church of St. Martin in Geisenhausen.

Reidel died on 21 July 2014 in Landshut, Germany.

== Personal life ==
In 1948, she married the sculptor Karl Reidel. Together, they had six children.

== Awards ==
- German Children's Book Award for Kasimirs Weltreise - 1958
- East Bavarian Culture Prize - 1965
- Special Prize from the German Academy for Children's and Youth Literature - 1977
- Bavarian Order of Merit - 1997
