= Herbert Kaufmann =

- Born: 24 August 1920
- Died: 27 November 1976 (aged 56)

Herbert Kaufmann (24 August 1920 – 27 November 1976) was a German Ethnologist, journalist, photographer and writer. He is known for his body of work concerning Africa, particularly – in the English-speaking world – his translated novel, Red Moon and High Summer (translated 2006), an adventure story set among the Tuaregs. The original German edition, Roter Mond und Heiße Zeit (1957), won the 1958 Deutscher Jugendliteraturpreis.

== Work ==
- Afrika, 1954
- Der verlorene Karawanenweg (also published as Die Hammelpiste), Graz u. a. 1955 (novel)
- Kongo zwischen gestern und morgen, Murnau 1956
- Der Teufel tanzt im Ju-Ju-Busch, Graz u. a. 1956 (novel)
- Roter Mond und Heiße Zeit, Graz u. a. 1957 (novel)
- Die Stadt unter dem Wüstensand, Graz u. a. 1957 (novel)
- Nigeria, Bonn 1958
- Reiten durch Iforas, München 1958 (illustrated travelogue)
- Sulei, der kleine Negerjunge, Köln u. a. 1958 (together with Gerty Kaufmann)
- Belgisch Kongo und Ruanda-Urundi, Bonn 1959
- Des Königs Krokodil, Köln u. a. 1959 (novel)
- Pfeile und Flöten, Graz u. a. 1960 (novel)
- La piste perdue. Paris 1960 (French translation of Der verlorene Karawanenweg)
- Äthiopien, Bonn 1962
- Dein neuer Nachbar in Afrika, Düsseldorf 1962
- Afrikas Weg in die Gegenwart, Braunschweig 1963
- Wirtschafts- und Sozialstruktur der Iforas-Tuareg, Köln 1964 (Doctorate)
- Tule Tiptops merkwürdige Reise, Graz u. a. 1977
- Red Moon and High Summer. London 2006 ISBN 0-907871-34-8 (English translation of Roter Mond und Heiße Zeit).
