= Lilo Fromm =

German artist and children's book illustrator

- Born: December 27, 1928; Berlin, Germany
- Died: June 19, 2023 (aged 94); Hamburg, Germany
- Occupation: Artist

Lilo Fromm (27 December 1928 – 19 June 2023) was a German artist and children's book illustrator. She illustrated more than 250 books during her life. In 1967, her illustrations for the book The Golden Bird won the Deutscher Jugendliteraturpreis.

== Biography ==
Fromm was born on 27 December 1928 in Berlin, Germany. She grew up in Berlin, and while she was young, she also lived in East Prussia and on the North Sea. She was educated in Berlin, Munich, Freiburg, and Hamburg.

She began her career in commercial art and advertising, including designing paper goods and book covers. She was a freelance artist in the 1950s, and turned to illustrating children's books mainly during the 1960s and 1970s. In 1957 in Germany, her first children's book illustrations were published by Georg Lentz Verlag. She co-published her first children's book with her friend and author, Gisela Bonsels.

She illustrated the children's book Das Mondgesicht (1960), which was a runner-up for the Hans Christian Andersen Award in 1962. In 1967, her illustrations for the book The Golden Bird won the Deutscher Jugendliteraturpreis and the Bratislava Gold Medal. She also illustrated the book Uncle Harry (1972), which won a Children's Book Showcase title in 1973.

In 1965, Fromm moved to Provence, France. She lived there until she moved back to Germany in 2016.

Fromm gave many of her illustrations to the International Youth Library, where her work is held in their collection. She died on 19 June 2023 in Hamburg, Germany, at the age of 94.

== Style of artwork ==
The majority of Fromm's children's book illustrations were made in a painterly style, which was in contrast to the graphic art style of most German picture book artists during the 1960s. Her work was colorful, and she worked with crayon and painted washes. Some of her work was created with black ink illustrations, such as the book Muffel and Plums.

Her fairy tales illustrations had a dream-like quality that emerged in Germany in the mid-1960s alongside other artists, including Helga Aichinger and Lieselotte Schwarz. Cristoph Meckel, while writing for Bookbird, said she used symbolism and archetypes in her depictions of fairy tales.

== Selected works ==
- Das Mondgesicht (1960, Obpacher Buch u. Kunstverlag) - written by Gerda Marie Scheidl
- Uncle Harry (1972, Macmillan) - written by Gerlinde Schneider, adapted by Elizabeth Shub
- Muffel and Plums (1973, Macmillan; 1973, Hamilton)
- Six Companions Find Their Fortune (1971, Doubleday) - written by Brothers Grimm
