= Steve Noon =

British illustrator

Steve Noon is a British illustrator, born in Kent, England.

Since 1985, Noon has worked as a professional artist. Noon studied Technical Illustration at the Art faculty at Falmouth University (formally Cornwall College of Further and Higher Education) in Cornwall. His illustrations have been award-winning, particularly those under publisher Dorling Kindersley.

Noon has illustrated books like A City Through Time and A Street Through Time that are part of a collection of books.
