= Sebastian Lybeck =

Finnish and Swedish writer

- Born: Carl Mikael Sebastian Lybeck; 3 August 1929; Helsinki, Finland
- Died: 11 November 2020 (aged 91); Stockholm, Sweden
- Occupations: Author, translator

Carl Mikael Sebastian Lybeck (3 August 1929 – 11 November 2020) was a Finland-Swedish author and translator who lived and worked in Finland and in his later years in Sweden. He was the grandson of Mikael Lybeck (1864–1925).

Lybeck's parents were the artist Nils Lybeck and the ceramist Marita Hahl. Lybeck graduated from Grankulla svenska samskola in 1947.

== Career ==
After university studies in Turku and Helsinki and Kadettskolan in Santahamina from 1949 to 1951, he worked as a journalist at Hufvudstadsbladet (1951–1952), Nya Pressen (1954) and Västra Nyland (1954–1955). He also worked as a salesman for Michelin from 1952 to 1953 and as a freelance journalist, construction worker, farmer and fisherman, among other things.

Afterwards he lived in various places in Norway, Denmark and Sweden; 1957 in Stockholm, 1959–1964 in Lofoten in Norway, then mainly in Sweden: during the 1970s in Uddevalla, since 2004 in Stockholm.

== Personal life ==
From 1958 he was married to the Norwegian teacher Berthe Marie Ruud (who died 2007) with whom he had two daughters. Sebastian Lybeck is buried at Skogskyrkogården in Stockholm.

== Bibliography ==
=== Poetry ===
- I tornet (Söderström, 1951)
- Patent 711 krumelur (Söderström,1955)
- Fågel över sju floder (Söderström, 1956)
- Jorden har alltid sitt ljus (Bonnier, 1958)
- Dikter från Lofoten (Bonnier, 1961)
- Liten stad vid havet : dikter (Bonnier, 1963)
- Mitt i den nordiska idyllen (Författarförlaget, 1972)
- Är det liv i ditt liv? (Författarförlaget, 1974)
- Vi ska slå upp portarna!: dikter (Författarförlaget, 1978)
- Dikter från Bohuslän (Permanent press, 1980)
- Råttansiktet eller Sub specie necessitatis : dikter (Författarförlaget, 1981)

=== Children's books ===
- Latte Igelkott och vattenstenen (illustrations by Veronica Leo) (Lindblad, 1956). Omarb. version Söderström, 2009
  - German translation: Latte Igel und der Wasserstein (1958)
  - Afrikaans translation: Die Dapper Rolvark (1962)
  - Dutch translation: Egeltje Prik (1965)
  - Danish translation: Povl Pindsvin og vandstenen (1967)
  - Thai translation: [Unknown title] (1988)
  - Finnish translation: Latte-siili ja Vesikivi (2009)
  - Lithuanian translation: Ežiukas Latė ir vandens skiltuvas (2012)
- Latte Igelkott reser till Egypten (illustrations by Veronica Leo) (Sörlin, 1958)
  - Dutch translation: Egeltje Prik naar Egypte (1960-tal)
- Als der Fuchs seine Ohren verlor (Thienemann, 1966) [not published in Swedish]
- När elefanten tog tanten (illustrated by Hans Jörgen Toming) (Svensk läraretidning, 1967)
  - Norwegian translation: Da elefanten tok leketanten (1967)
  - Dutch translation: De toversleutel (1967)
  - Finnish translation: Kun elefantti Kyösti puistotädin ryösti (1967)
  - English translation: The magic key (1967)
  - Danish translation: Da elefanten tog tanten (1967)
  - French translation: La clé à tout faire (1967)
- Bokstavskatten (with Caje Huss) (Tiden, 1969)
- Latte Igelkott reser till Lofoten (Söderström, 2012)
  - German translation: Latte Igel reist zu den Lofoten (1969)
  - Danish translation: Povl Pindsvin ta'r til Lofoten (1970)
  - Finnish translation: Latte-siili Lofooteilla (2012)
- Latte Igelkott och Svarta Skuggan (Söderströms, 2010)
  - Finnish translation: Latte-siili ja Musta Varjo (2010)
- Ein grosser Tag für Latte Igel (2012) [not published in Swedish]

=== Translations ===
- Christian Morgenstern: Det upplysta månlammet (FIB:s lyrikklubb, 1958)
- Med andra ögon: modern holländsk lyrik (translated with Jan F. de Zanger) (FIB:s lyrikklubb, 1968)
- En diktare är ingen sockersäck: nio obekväma poeter i DDR: en antologi (by Jan Andrew Nilsen and Sebastian Lybeck) (FIB:s lyrikklubb, 1968)
- Jack Tworkov: Den vackra kamelens morgonpromenad (The camel who took a walk) (Tiden, 1969.)

== Awards ==
- Deutscher Jugendliteraturpreis 1959 (for the book Latte Igel und der Wasserstein)
- Längmanska kulturfondens Finlandprize 1966
