= Clara Asscher-Pinkhof =

Dutch children's writer (1896–1984)

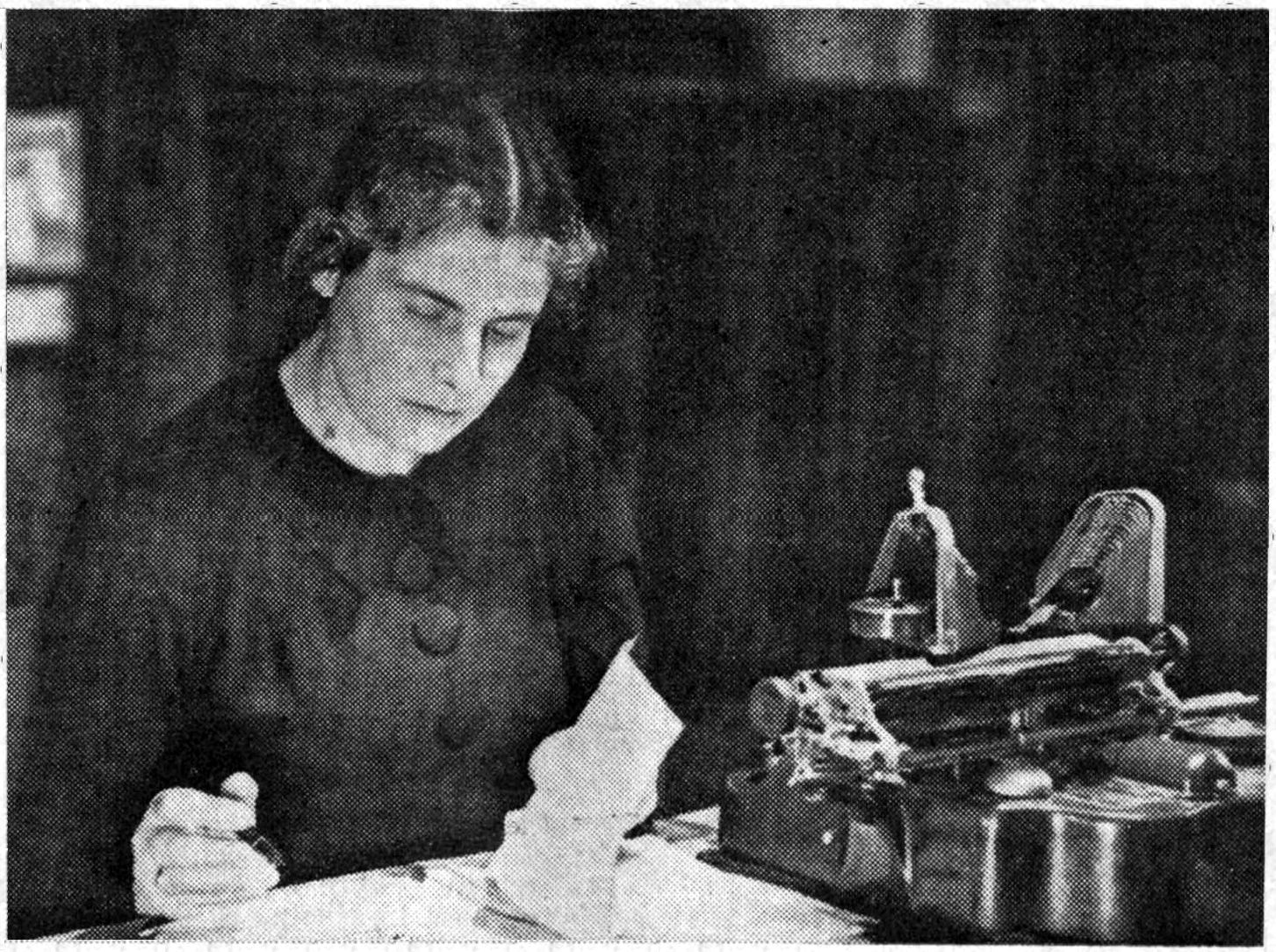
Clara Asscher-Pinkhof in 1936

Clara Asscher-Pinkhof (1896–1984) was a Dutch children's writer best known for her stories about children in the Holocaust. Working as a teacher and writer for journals and magazines, Asscher-Pinkhof helped look after deported Jewish children and survived five months' imprisonment at Bergen-Belsen concentration camp.

== Early life ==
She was born on 25 October 1896 in Amsterdam, one of eight children of doctor Hermanus Pinkhof and his wife Adele, née Beer. Her siblings included composer Miriam Shatal. Working as a teacher in the village of Deil, Clara began publishing nursery rhymes and songs in children's magazines.

In 1918, she published a collection of children's songs to help children connect with their Jewish heritage. In 1919, she married Rabbi Abraham Asscher, whom she had met while working at a Jewish children's charity, and moved to Groningen. They had six children. Abraham died in 1926, and Clara remained in Groningen, writing articles for newspapers.

== World War II ==
In 1940, when Germany invaded the Netherlands, Clara and her youngest child, fourteen-year-old Fieke, returned to Amsterdam, where Clara taught in the newly established Jewish schools. Clara wrote for Het Joodse Weekblad (The Jewish Weekly) journal and helped to look after children who were sent to the Joodse Schouwburg Theatre before deportation.

Clara was arrested on 26 May 1943 and sent to Westerbork transit camp. She was deported to Bergen-Belsen concentration camp on 11 January 1944, where she was held until June when she was among a group of two thousand prisoners sent to Palestine in an exchange for German prisoners. She joined her daughter Roza, who had moved to Palestine to work as a nurse in 1939, and was joined by Fieke after the war. Two of her children, Menachem and Isaac, had been killed in the camps.

== Writing and later life ==
In 1946, her Sterrekinderen (Star Children) was published. This collection of stories concern individual children in the Holocaust, identified by the stars they had to wear. The stories follow the sequence of the children's journeys from Amsterdam via the Joodse Schouwburg Theatre to Westerbork, and finally Bergen-Belsen, which the book calls 'Star Hell'. The book was translated into several languages and won the Deutscher Jugendliteraturpreis (German Children's Literature Award) in 1962.

In 1966 she wrote an autobiography, Danseres zonder benen (Dancer Without Legs).

Clara, who remarried in 1958, spent much of her later life in Palestine and died in 1984 in Haifa.
