= Jacob Ralph Abarbanell =

American lawyer, author, and playwright

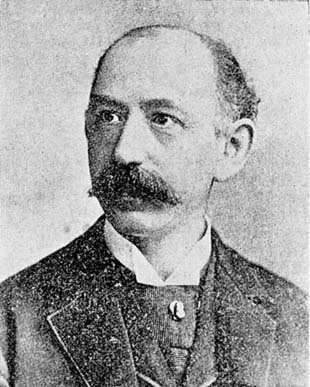
- Born: December 6, 1852
- Died: November 9, 1922 (aged 69)
- Citizenship: American
- Occupations: Novelist; playwright; journalist
- Spouse: Cornelia Louise Eaton (m. 1892)
- Writing career
- Pen name: Paul Revere, Ralph Royal
- Language: English

Jacob Ralph Abarbanell (December 6, 1852 – November 9, 1922) was an American lawyer, author, and playwright from New York City.

== Early life ==
Jacob Ralph Abarbanell was born to furrier Rudolph Abarbanell and his wife Rosalia. He married Cornelia L. Eaton, of Jersey City, on June 30, 1892. After graduating from City College in 1872 and Columbia Law in 1874, he practiced in the city.

== Literary career ==
While practicing law, he also wrote stories, articles, magazine serials, and plays throughout his life.

While some work and translations were published under his own name, he also used the pseudonyms 'Ralph Royal' and 'Paul Revere'. His best known works were the books The Model Pair (1881) and The Rector's Secret (1892), and the dramas Countess of Monte Cristo (1902) and The Heart of the People (1909). He also published translations of stories from French and German.
