= Jörg Mühle =

- Born: 1973 (age 52–53); Frankfurt, Germany
- Occupation: Writer

Jörg Mühle (born in Frankfurt in 1973) is a freelance illustrator, and author of children's books. He studied at the Hochschule für Gestaltung Offenbach am Main, and at the prestigious École nationale supérieure des arts décoratifs in Paris.

Mühle is known for the board book Nur noch kurz die Ohren kraulen? (published in English by Gecko Press as Tickle My Ears) which has sold over sixty thousand copies in Germany, and been translated into six languages.

== Works ==
=== Children’s books ===
- Tickle My Ears – Gecko Press, 2016, ISBN 9781776570768
- Bathtime for Little Rabbit – Gecko Press, 2017, ISBN 9781776571376
- Poor Little Rabbit! – Gecko Press, 2018, ISBN 978-1-776571-77-2
