= Marit Kaldhol =

Norwegian writer

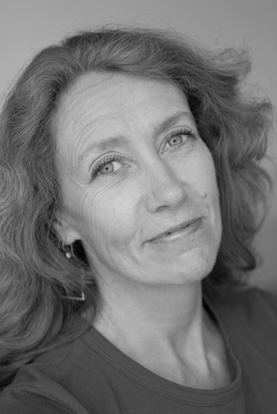
Marit Kaldhol.

Marit Kaldhol (born 13 April 1955) is a Norwegian poet and children's writer.

She was born in Ålesund. Her poetry collections include her 1983 debut Lattermilde laken ('Mirthful Bed Sheets') and 2005's Den einaste kjolen ('The Only Dress'). Her children's books include the internationally acclaimed Farvel, Rune ('Goodbye, Rune', 1986). Translated into German as Abschied von Rune, it earned her the Deutscher Jugendliteraturpreis in 1988.
