= Bettina Abarbanell =

German literary translator

Bettina Abarbanell (born 1961 in Hamburg) is a German literary translator, best known for her English-to-German translations of novels by authors F. Scott Fitzgerald, Denis Johnson, Rachel Kushner, Elizabeth Taylor, Catherine Lacey, and Jonathan Franzen. In 2014, Abarbanell received the Translator Award from the Heinrich Maria Ledig-Rowohlt Foundation and in 2015 a Barthold Heinrich Brockes scholarship from the German Translation Fund.
