= 1956 in literature =

This article contains information about the literary events and publications of 1956.

== Events ==
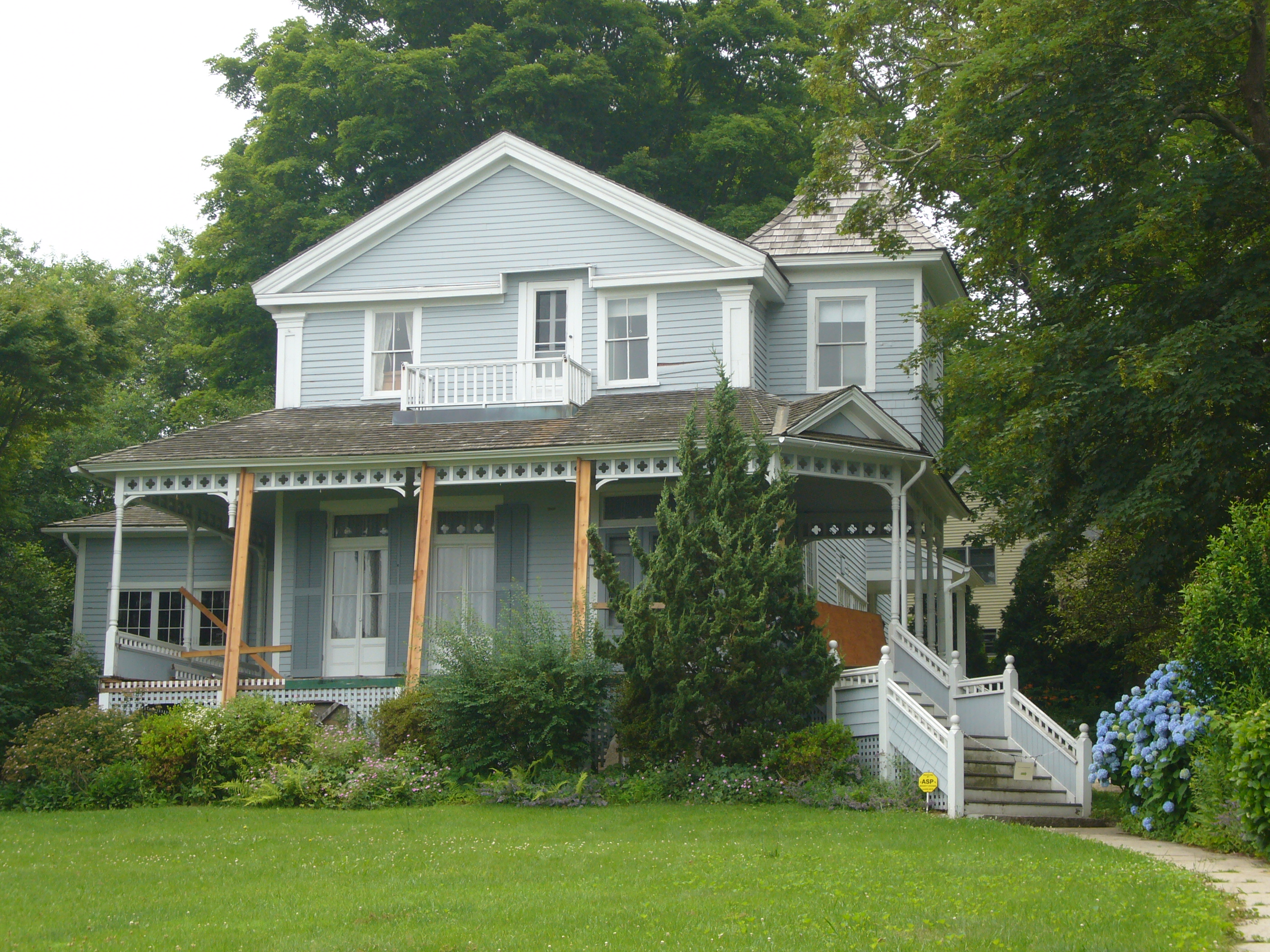
Monte Cristo Cottage, boyhood summer home of Eugene O'Neill and the setting for two of his works, Long Day's Journey into Night, and Ah, Wilderness!

- c. January – The first book in Ed McBain's long-running 87th Precinct police procedural series, Cop Hater, is published in the United States under Evan Hunter's new pseudonym.
- February 2 – Eugene O'Neill's semi-autobiographical Long Day's Journey into Night (completed in 1942) receives a posthumous world première at the Royal Dramatic Theatre, Stockholm, in Swedish (Lång dags färd mot natt), directed by Bengt Ekerot and starring Lars Hanson. Its Broadway debut at the Helen Hayes Theatre on November 7 follows an American première at the Shubert Theatre (New Haven).
- February 25 – The English poet Ted Hughes and American poet Sylvia Plath meet in Cambridge, England.
- March 11 – The U.S. release of Sir Laurence Olivier's film version of Shakespeare's Richard III plays simultaneously on NBC network television and as afternoon matinée screenings in movie theaters. Its TV audience is put at 25–40 million – almost certainly the largest to date for a Shakespeare production.
- March 19 – The widowed English author Aldous Huxley marries the Italian-American film-maker and author Laura Archera at a drive-in wedding chapel in Yuma, Arizona.
- April 23 – The British author C. S. Lewis and American poet Joy Gresham have a civil marriage at Oxford register office.
- May 8 – The first performance of John Osborne's play Look Back in Anger is given by the newly formed English Stage Company at the Royal Court Theatre in London. The principal cast are Kenneth Haigh, Mary Ure (who begins an affair with Osborne) and Alan Bates (in his first major role). The press release describes Osborne as one of the angry young men of the time, a phrase used on July 26 in a Daily Express headline.
- June 16 – Ted Hughes and Sylvia Plath marry at St George the Martyr, Holborn in the London Borough of Camden.
- June 21 – Playwright Arthur Miller appears before the House Un-American Activities Committee in Washington, D.C.
- June 26 and August 23 – Books published by the discredited psychoanalyst Wilhelm Reich are burned in the United States under a court injunction.
- June – Nineteen-year-old Hunter S. Thompson is arrested as an accessory to robbery.
- June 29 – Arthur Miller marries Marilyn Monroe in White Plains, New York.
- July – After pleas by Israeli diplomats, the Romanian communist regime releases A. L. Zissu, formally sentenced to life imprisonment in 1954. Zissu emigrates to Israel, where he dies on September 6.
- July 4 – The National Library of Scotland's first purpose-built premises open in Edinburgh.
- July 8 – The drama series Armchair Theatre, produced by ABC Weekend TV for the ITV network in the United Kingdom, begins a twelve-year run.
- August 14 – Iris Murdoch marries John Bayley at Oxford register office.
- September 14 – Harold Pinter marries Vivien Merchant in a civil ceremony at Bournemouth, after they meet while touring in repertory theatre.
- October – The Ladder becomes the first nationally distributed lesbian magazine in the United States.
- November 1 – Allen Ginsberg's Howl and Other Poems, a signal work of the Beat Generation, is published by City Lights Bookstore in San Francisco.
- December
  - J. G. Ballard's first professional publications, the science fiction short stories "Escapement" and "Prima Belladonna", appear in this month's issues of New Worlds and Science Fantasy respectively.
  - Martin Gardner begins his Mathematical Games column in Scientific American.
- December 3 – The author Romain Gary wins the Prix Goncourt for Les Racines du ciel. He would later become the only person to win the prize twice, publishing La Vie devant soi under the pseudonym Émile Ajar in 1975.
- unknown dates
  - Finished in 1952, Egyptian author Naguib Mahfouz's Cairo Trilogy (Palace Walk, Palace of Desire, Sugar Street), is first published.
  - Sixteen-year-old Michael Moorcock becomes editor of Tarzan Adventures.
  - Jorge Luis Borges becomes a professor of English and American literature at the University of Buenos Aires.

== New books ==
=== Fiction ===
- Nelson Algren – A Walk on the Wild Side
- Eric Ambler – The Night-Comers
- Kingsley Amis – That Uncertain Feeling
- Poul Anderson – Planet of No Return
- Charlotte Armstrong – A Dram of Poison
- Isaac Asimov – The Naked Sun
- James Baldwin – Giovanni's Room
- Sybille Bedford – A Legacy
- Saul Bellow – Seize the Day
- Pierre Berton – The Mysterious North
- Alfred Bester – The Stars My Destination (as Tiger! Tiger!)
- W. E. Bowman – The Ascent of Rum Doodle
- Pearl S. Buck – Imperial Woman
- John Bude – A Telegram from Le Touquet
- Anthony Burgess – Time for a Tiger
- Albert Camus – The Fall (La Chute)
- John Dickson Carr
  - Patrick Butler for the Defense
  - Fear is the Same (as Carter Dickson)
- Henry Cecil – Friends at Court
- Agatha Christie
  - Dead Man's Folly
  - "The Burden"
- Arthur C. Clarke – The City and the Stars
- A. J. Cronin
  - A Thing of Beauty
  - Crusader's Tomb
- Antonio di Benedetto – Zama
- Cecil Day-Lewis – A Tangled Web
- Nh. Dini – Dua Dunia (Two Worlds, stories)
- Philip K. Dick
  - The Man Who Japed
  - The Minority Report
- Gordon R. Dickson
  - Alien From Arcturus
  - Mankind on the Run
- Alfred Döblin – Tales of a Long Night (Hamlet oder Die lange Nacht nimmt ein Ende)
- Friedrich Dürrenmatt – A Dangerous Game (Die Panne – The Breakdown – or Traps)
- Ian Fleming – Diamonds Are Forever
- Naomi Frankel – Shaul ve-Yohannah (שאול ויוהאנה, "Saul and Joanna", publication begins)
- Sarah Gainham – Time Right Deadly
- Romain Gary – Les Racines du ciel
- William Golding – Pincher Martin
- Winston Graham – The Sleeping Partner
- Walter Greenwood – Down by the Sea
- Edward Grierson – The Second Man
- Henri René Guieu – Les Monstres du Néant
- Mark Harris – Bang the Drum Slowly
- Frank Herbert – The Dragon in the Sea (first book publication)
- Georgette Heyer – Sprig Muslin
- Kathryn Hulme – The Nun's Story
- James Kennaway – Tunes of Glory
- Feri Lainšček – Petelinji zajtrk
- Meyer Levin – Compulsion
- C. S. Lewis – Till We Have Faces: A Myth Retold
- E. C. R. Lorac – Murder in Vienna
- Rose Macaulay – The Towers of Trebizond
- Ross Macdonald – The Barbarous Coast
- Compton Mackenzie – Thin Ice
- Ed McBain – Cop Hater
- Naguib Mahfouz – Palace Walk (بين القصرين, Bein el-Qasrein, first of the Cairo Trilogy)
- Ngaio Marsh – Off with His Head
- Grace Metalious – Peyton Place
- Yukio Mishima (三島 由紀夫) – The Temple of the Golden Pavilion (金閣寺)
- Gladys Mitchell – Twelve Horses and the Hangman's Noose
- Nicholas Monsarrat – The Tribe that Lost its Head
- Farley Mowat – Lost in the Barrens
- Agnar Mykle – The Song of the Red Ruby (Sangen om den røde rubin)
- Patrick O'Brian – The Golden Ocean
- Edwin O'Connor – The Last Hurrah
- Pier Paolo Pasolini – Ragazzi di vita
- Mervyn Peake – Boy in Darkness
- Mary Renault – The Last of the Wine
- Kenneth Roberts – Boon Island
- João Guimarães Rosa – The Devil to Pay in the Backlands (Grande Sertão: Veredas)
- Françoise Sagan – A Certain Smile (Un certain Sourire)
- Samuel Selvon – The Lonely Londoners
- Irwin Shaw – Lucy Crown
- Georges Simenon – The Little Man from Archangel (Le Petit Homme d'Arkhangelsk)
- Khushwant Singh – Train to Pakistan
- Rex Stout
  - Might as Well Be Dead
  - Three Witnesses
- Julian Symons – The Paper Chase
- A. E. van Vogt – The Wizard of Linn
- Heimito von Doderer – Die Dämonen. Nach der Chronik des Sektionsrates Geyrenhoff (The Demons)
- Angus Wilson – Anglo-Saxon Attitudes
- P. G. Wodehouse – French Leave
- Kateb Yacine – Nedjma
- Frank Yerby – Captain Rebel
- Eiji Yoshikawa (吉川 英治) – The Heike Story: A Modern Translation of the Classic Tale of Love and War (Shin Heike monogatari, a retelling of The Tale of the Heike)
- Francis Brett Young – Wistanslow

=== Children and young people ===
- Rev. W. Awdry – Percy the Small Engine (eleventh in The Railway Series of 42 books by him and his son Christopher Awdry)
- Polly Cameron – The Cat Who Thought He Was a Tiger
- R. F. Delderfield – The Adventures of Ben Gunn
- Fred Gipson – Old Yeller
- Rumer Godden – The Fairy Doll
- C. S. Lewis – The Last Battle
- Alf Prøysen – Little Old Mrs Pepperpot (first in a long series of Mrs Pepperpot – Teskjekjerringa – books)
- Maurice Sendak – Kenny's Window
- Ian Serraillier – The Silver Sword
- Dodie Smith – The Hundred and One Dalmatians
- Virginia Sorensen – Miracles on Maple Hill
- Eve Titus – Anatole (first in the Anatole and Basil series of 14 books)

=== Drama ===
- Jean Anouilh – Pauvre Bitos, ou Le dîner de têtes (Poor Bitos)
- Ferdinand Bruckner – The Fight with the Angel (Der Kampf mit dem Engel)
- José Manuel Castañón – Moletú-Volevá
- Agatha Christie and Gerald Verner – Towards Zero
- Noël Coward – Nude with Violin
- Friedrich Dürrenmatt – The Visit (Der Besuch der alten Dame)
- Max Frisch – Philipp Hotz's Fury (Die Grosse Wut des Philipp Hotz)
- Anna Langfus – Les Lepreux (The Lepers, first performed)
- Hugh Leonard – The Birthday Party
- Saunders Lewis – Siwan
- Bruce Mason – The Pohutukawa Tree
- Ronald Millar – The Bride and the Bachelor
- Arthur Miller – A View from the Bridge (revised version)
- Hugh Mills – The House by the Lake
- Yukio Mishima – Rokumeikan
- Heiner Müller and Inge Müller – Der Lohndrücker (The Scab, written)
- Eugene O'Neill – Long Day's Journey into Night
- John Osborne – Look Back in Anger
- Arnold Wesker – Chicken Soup with Barley (written)

=== Poetry ===
- Allen Ginsberg – Howl
- Anne Morrow Lindbergh – The Unicorn and Other Poems
- Harry Martinson – Aniara
- Yevgeny Yevtushenko – Stantsiia Zima (Станция Зима, Zima Station, translated as Winter Station)

=== Non-fiction ===
- Peter Frederick Anson – The Call of the Cloister: Religious Communities and Kindred Bodies in the Anglican Communion
- John G. Bennett – Dramatic Universe
- Peter M. Blau – Bureaucracy in Modern Society
- Gerald Durrell – My Family and Other Animals
- Margery Fish – We Made a Garden
- Georges Friedmann – Le travail en miettes (The Anatomy of Work)
- Erving Goffman – The Presentation of Self in Everyday Life
- Carl Gustav Jung – Mysterium Coniunctionis
- A. J. Liebling – The Sweet Science
- Norman Mailer – The White Negro
- Karl Mannheim – Essays on the Sociology of Culture
- C. Wright Mills – The Power Elite
- Alva Myrdal and Viola Klein – Women's Two Roles: Home and Work
- Octavio Paz – El arco y la lira
- Lobsang Rampa – The Third Eye
- Irving Stone – Men to Match My Mountains (Account of the opening of the American Old West, 1840–1900)
- John Strachey – Contemporary Capitalism

== Births ==
- January 2 – Storm Constantine, British science fiction and fantasy author
- January 4 – Sarojini Sahoo, Indian journalist, author, and poet
- January 8 – Jack Womack, American novelist
- January 10 – Antonio Muñoz Molina, Spanish novelist
- January 21 – Ian McMillan, English poet
- January 14 – Ronan Bennett, Northern Irish novelist
- February 20 – François Bréda, Romanian essayist, poet, literary critic, literary historian, translator and theatrologist (died 2018)
- February 26 – Michel Houellebecq, French novelist
- March 3 – Frank Giroud, French comics writer (died 2018)
- March 7 – Andrea Levy, English novelist (died 2019)
- March 12 – Ruth Ozeki, American novelist and filmmaker
- March 20
  - Minken Fosheim, Norwegian actress and author (died 2018)
  - Win Lyovarin, Thai novelist and short story writer
- March 23 – Steven Saylor, American historical novelist
- April 7 – Christopher Darden, African-American attorney, author, actor and lecturer
- April 12 – Yasuo Tanaka, Japanese novelist and politician
- April 29 – Alexander Jablokov, American writer and novelist
- May 4 – David Guterson, American journalist and novelist
- May 9 – Cindy Lovell, American educator and writer
- May 18 – John Godber, English dramatist
- May 20
  - Boris Akunin, Russian novelist and essayist
  - Ingvar Ambjørnsen, Norwegian writer (died 2025)
- June 9 – Patricia Cornwell, American crime novelist
- June 25 – Anthony Bourdain, American chef, writer and television personality (died 2018)
- June 26 – Davide Ferrario, Italian film director, screenwriter and author
- June 29 – Richard Summerbell, Canadian mycologist, author and songwriter
- July 2 – Cynthia Kadohata, Japanese-American children's writer
- July 4 – Éric Neuhoff, French novelist
- July 11 – Amitav Ghosh, Bengali Indian novelist
- September 6 – Mai Yamani, Saudi Arabian independent scholar, author and anthropologist
- October 9 – Robert Reed, American science fiction author
- October 13 – Chris Carter, American screenwriter
- October 16 – Meg Rosoff, American-British children's and young-adult writer
- October 18 – Lucy Ellmann, Anglo-American novelist
- October 21 – Carrie Fisher, American actress and novelist (died 2016)
- November 11 – Tim Pears, English novelist
- November 20 – Elena Gremina, Russian dramatist (died 2018)
- November 26 – John McCarthy, English journalist and hostage
- December 22 – Percival Everett, American writer and novelist
- unknown dates
  - James Aboud, Trinidad poet and judge
  - James Belich, New Zealand historian
  - Amy Gerstler, American poet

== Deaths ==
- January 13 – Wickham Steed, English journalist, editor and historian (born 1871)
- January 14 – Sheila Kaye-Smith, English novelist (born 1887)
- January 29 – H. L. Mencken, American journalist and English language scholar (born 1880)
- January 31 – A. A. Milne, English children's author, novelist and dramatist (born 1882)
- March 30 – Edmund Clerihew Bentley, English novelist and inventor of the clerihew (born 1875)
- April 22 – Otto Roth, Hungarian Romanian politician, journalist, and literary promoter (born 1884 )
- May 15 – Arthur Talmage Abernethy, American theologian and poet (born 1872)
- May 20 – Max Beerbohm, English humorist (born 1872)
- May 22 – Ion Călugăru, Romanian novelist, short story writer and journalist (born 1902)
- June 7 – Julien Benda, French philosopher and novelist (born 1867)
- June 22 – Walter de la Mare, English poet (born 1873)
- June 24 – Nicos Nicolaides, Greek writer (born 1884)
- July 7 – Gottfried Benn, German poet and essayist (born 1886)
- July 8 – Giovanni Papini, Italian essayist, poet and novelist (born 1881)
- August 14 – Bertolt Brecht, German dramatist (born 1898)
- September 6
  - Michael Ventris, English linguistic scholar (born 1922)
  - A. L. Zissu, Romanian novelist and Zionist leader (born 1888)
- September 12 – Hans Carossa, German novelist and poet (born 1878)
- October 30 – Pío Baroja, Spanish novelist (born 1872)
- December 6 – B. R. Ambedkar, principal architect of the Constitution of India (born 1891)
- December 13 – Arthur Grimble, Hong Kong-born English travel writer (born 1888)
- December 25 – Robert Walser, Swiss novelist and poet writing in German (born 1878)

== Awards ==
- Carnegie Medal for children's literature: C. S. Lewis, The Last Battle
- Deutscher Jugendbuchpreis (first award): Roger Duvoisin and Louise Fatio, Happy Lion (Der glückliche Löwe); Astrid Lindgren, Mio, My Son; and Kurt Lütgen, Kein Winter für Wölfe ("Two Against the Arctic: Story of a Restless Life between Greenland and Alaska")
- Duff Cooper Prize: Alan Moorehead, Gallipoli
- Friedenspreis des Deutschen Buchhandels: Reinhold Schneider
- James Tait Black Memorial Prize for fiction: Rose Macaulay, The Towers of Trebizond
- James Tait Black Memorial Prize for biography: St John Greer Ervine, George Bernard Shaw
- Madan Puraskar (first award): Satya Mohan Joshi, Hamro Lok Sanskriti; Chittaranjan Nepali, Janaral Bhimsen Thapa Ra Tatkalin Nepal; and Bala Ram Joshi, Adhikbibhav Sthirbidhoot Utpadhak
- Newbery Medal for children's literature: Jean Lee Latham, Carry On, Mr. Bowditch
- Nobel Prize in Literature: Juan Ramón Jiménez
- Premio Nadal: José Luis Martín Descalzo, La frontera de Dios
- Prix Goncourt: Romain Gary for The Roots of Heaven
- Pulitzer Prize for Drama: Albert Hackett and Frances Goodrich, Diary of Anne Frank
- Pulitzer Prize for Fiction: MacKinlay Kantor, Andersonville
- Pulitzer Prize for Poetry: Elizabeth Bishop, Poems – North & South
- Queen's Gold Medal for Poetry: Edmund Blunden

== Notes ==
- Hahn, Daniel (2015). The Oxford Companion to Children's Literature (2nd ed.). Oxford. University Press. ISBN 9780198715542.
