= Peapack-Gladstone, New Jersey =

Borough in Somerset County, New Jersey, US

- Borough
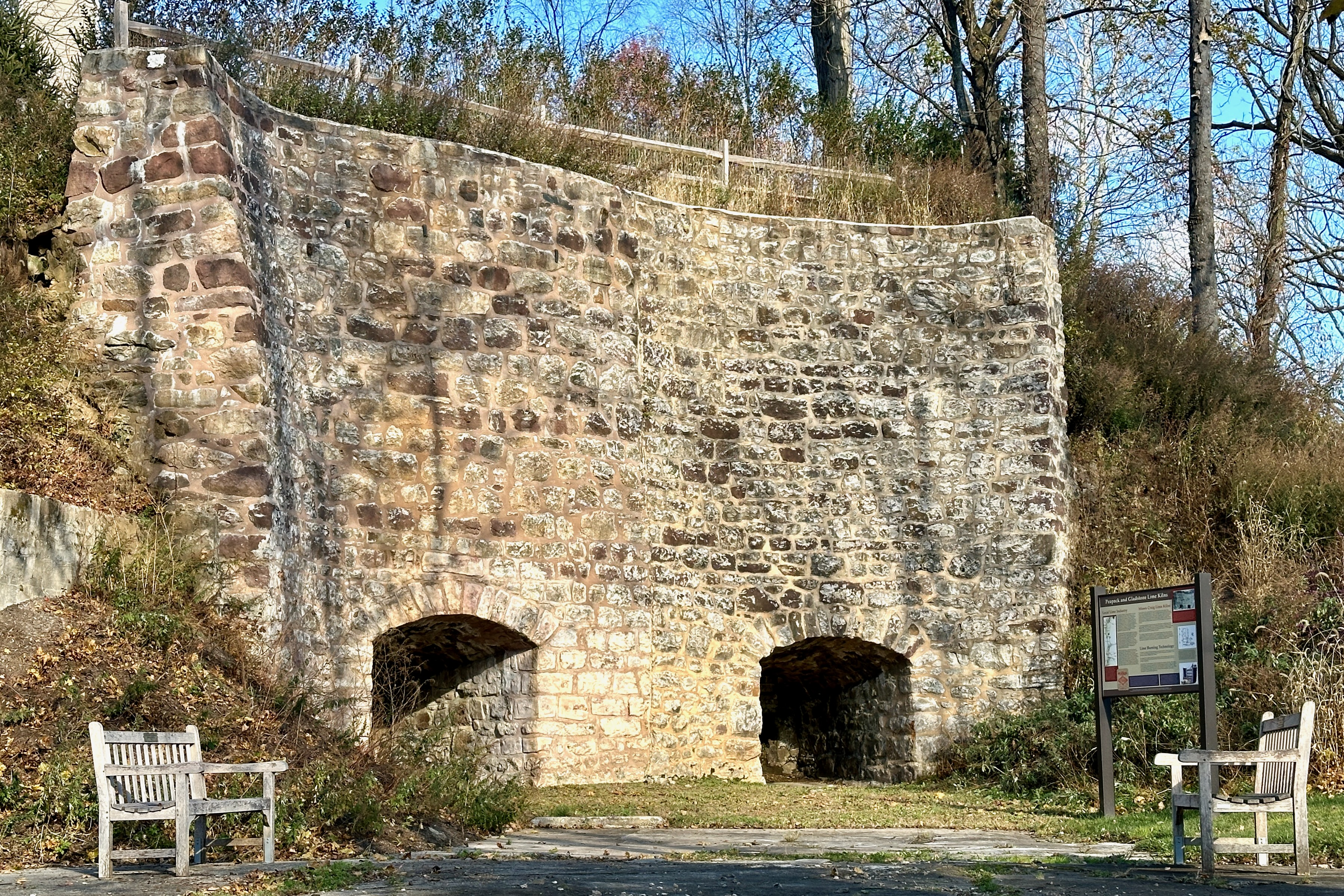
- Moses Craig Lime Kilns, listed on the National Register of Historic Places

- Seal

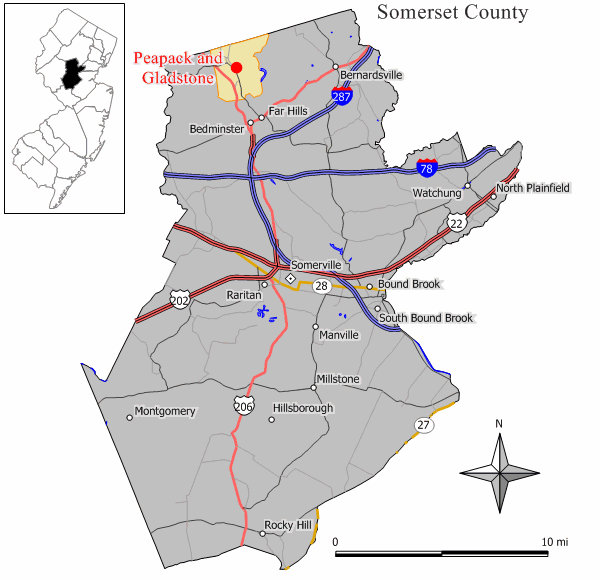
- Location of Peapack-Gladstone in Somerset County highlighted in yellow (right). Inset map: Location of Somerset County in New Jersey highlighted in black (left).

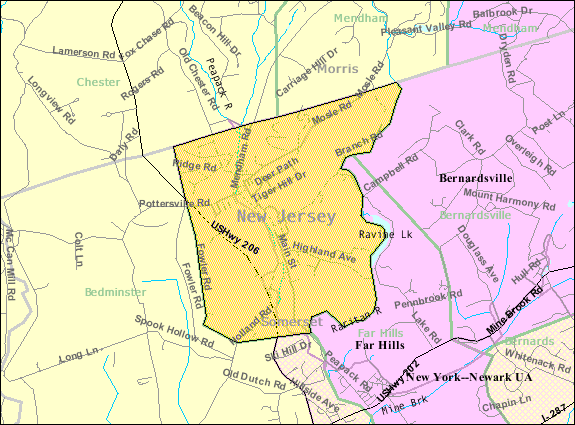
- Census Bureau map of Peapack-Gladstone, New Jersey

- Location in Somerset County Location in New Jersey Location in the United States
- Coordinates: 40.715782°N 74.654054°W
- Country: United States
- State: New Jersey
- County: Somerset
- Incorporated: April 23, 1912

Government
  - Type: Borough
  - Body: Borough Council
  - Mayor: Mark A. Corigliano (R, term ends December 31, 2026)
  - Administrator: Nancy Bretzger
  - Municipal clerk: Nancy Bretzger

Area
  - Total: 5.80 sq mi (15.03 km^{2})
  - Land: 5.73 sq mi (14.85 km^{2})
  - Water: 0.069 sq mi (0.18 km^{2}) 1.21%
  - Rank: 262nd of 565 in state 11th of 21 in county
- Elevation: 243 ft (74 m)

Population (2020)
  - Total: 2,558
  - Estimate (2023): 2,538
  - Rank: 466th of 565 in state 18th of 21 in county
  - Density: 446.2/sq mi (172.3/km^{2})
  - Rank: 447th of 565 in state 19th of 21 in county
- Time zone: UTC−05:00 (Eastern (EST))
  - Summer (DST): UTC−04:00 (Eastern (EDT))
- ZIP Codes: 07934 – Gladstone; 07977 – Peapack
- Area code: 908
- FIPS code: 3403557300
- GNIS feature ID: 0885345
- Website: www.peapackgladstone.org

Peapack-Gladstone (also written as Peapack and Gladstone) is a borough in the Somerset Hills region of northern Somerset County in the U.S. state of New Jersey. As of the 2020 United States census, the borough's population was 2,558, a decrease of 24 (−0.9%) from the 2010 census count of 2,582, which in turn reflected an increase of 149 (+6.1%) from the 2,433 counted in the 2000 census.

Peapack-Gladstone was incorporated as a borough by an act of the New Jersey Legislature on March 28, 1912, from portions of Bedminster, subject to the results of a referendum held on April 23, 1912. It is part of the New York metropolitan area, as well as the larger New York–Newark–Bridgeport, NY-New Jersey-CT-PA Combined Statistical Area and it is located within the Raritan Valley region.

Peapack is home to historic Natirar as well as the Essex Hunt Club and Fox Hounds. In operation until the mid-1930s, the Moses Craig Lime Kilns are located at the center of Peapack.

Gladstone is home to the Hamilton Farm Golf Club, the Stronghold Soccer Club and the United States Equestrian Team. Gill St. Bernard's School, established in 1900, is a private, nonsectarian, coeducational, college preparatory day school, serving students in pre-kindergarten through twelfth grade, located on a 208-acre (84 ha) campus that straddles the borders of Gladstone and neighboring Chester Township in Morris County.

In the Forbes magazine 2017 ranking of the Most Expensive ZIP Codes in the United States, Gladstone was ranked as the 457th most expensive in the country, with its median home sale price of $938,042. In 2018, New Jersey Business Magazine listed Gladstone at 46th in its listing of "The Most Expensive ZIP Codes in New Jersey", with a median sale price 2017 of $627,500.

== History ==
=== Formation ===
In 1912, the communities of Peapack and Gladstone found themselves in conflict with the rest of Bedminster. Residents of the two communities wanted electric lights, telephones and fire hydrants and resented being forced to pay for rural roads elsewhere in the township. Residents petitioned the state legislature for the creation of the borough and the Legislature voted to do so on April 23, 1912.

=== Village names ===
Peapack is believed to have been derived from "Peapackton,” a Lenape Native American term meaning "marriage of the waters", a reference to the confluence of the Peapack Brook and Raritan River in the area. Gladstone was named in honor of William Ewart Gladstone, who served as British Prime Minister several times between 1868 and 1894.

=== Natirar ===
Natirar is an estate spanning 404 acres (163 ha) in Peapack-Gladstone, Far Hills and Bedminster that was sold by Hassan II of Morocco, to Somerset County and is now administered by the Somerset County Park Commission, including the 247 acres (100 ha) in Peapack-Gladstone.

== Geography ==
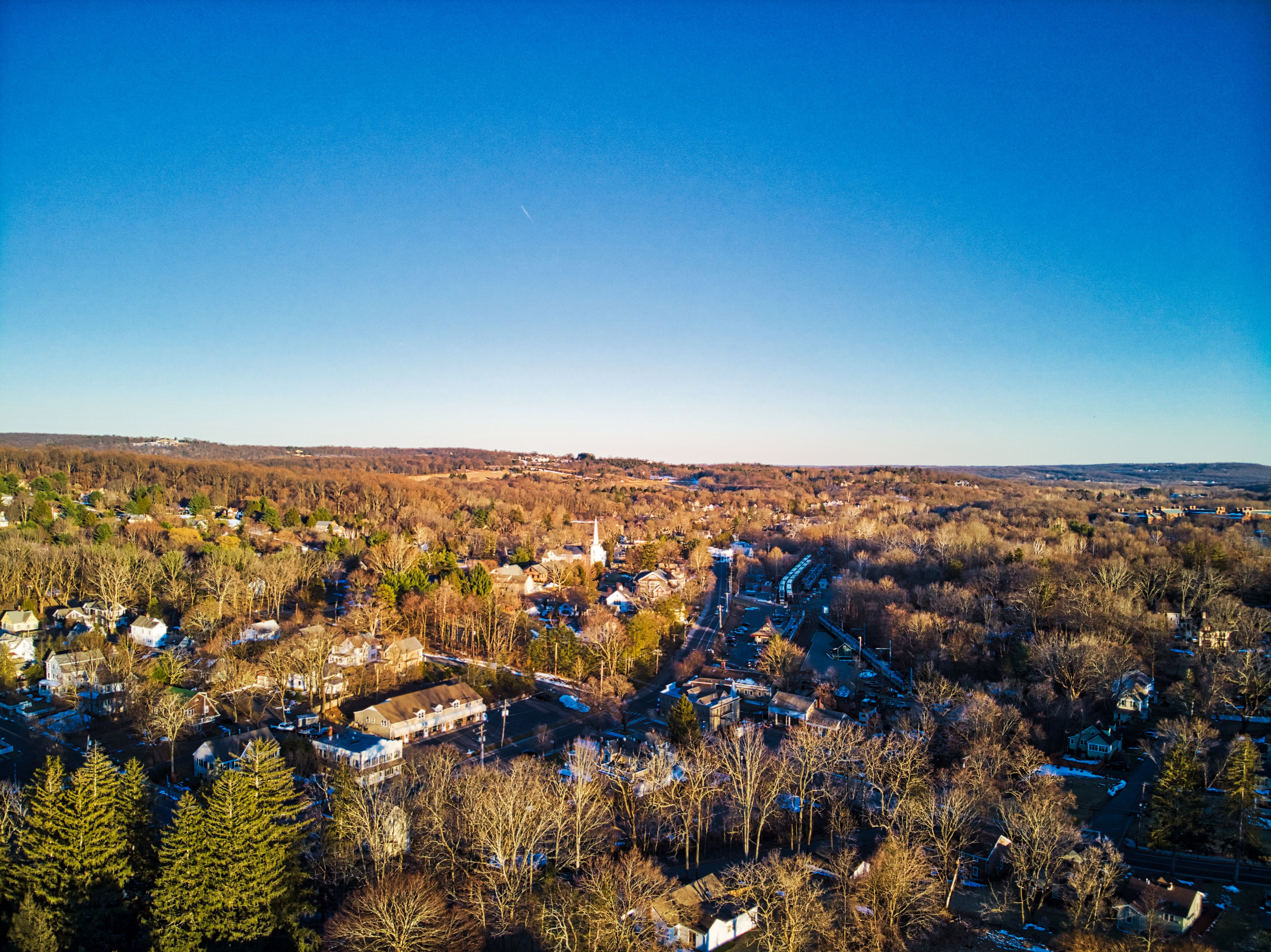
Downtown Gladstone with Peapack in the distance.

According to the United States Census Bureau, the borough had a total area of 5.80 square miles (15.03 km^{2}), including 5.73 square miles (14.85 km^{2}) of land and 0.07 square miles (0.18 km^{2}) of water (1.21%).

Unincorporated communities, localities and place names located partially or completely within the township include Gladstone, Peapack and Ravine Lake.

Peapack-Gladstone borders other Somerset Hills communities in Somerset and Morris counties including: Bedminster to the southwest, Bernardsville to the east, Far Hills to the southeast, Chester Township to the northwest, and Mendham Township to the northeast.

== Demographics ==
Historical population
Census	Pop.	Note	%±
1920	1,226		—
1930	1,273		3.8%
1940	1,354		6.4%
1950	1,450		7.1%
1960	1,804		24.4%
1970	1,924		6.7%
1980	2,038		5.9%
1990	2,111		3.6%
2000	2,433		15.3%
2010	2,582		6.1%
2020	2,558		−0.9%
2023 (est.)	2,538	▼	−0.8%
Population sources: 1920 1920–1930; 1940–2000 2000; 2010 2020

=== 2010 census ===
The 2010 United States census counted 2,582 people, 887 households, and 676 families in the borough. The population density was 444.5 per square mile (171.6/km^{2}). There were 949 housing units at an average density of 163.4 per square mile (63.1/km^{2}). The racial makeup was 90.09% (2,326) White, 4.07% (105) Black or African American, 0.12% (3) Native American, 1.94% (50) Asian, 0.04% (1) Pacific Islander, 1.74% (45) from other races, and 2.01% (52) from two or more races. Hispanic or Latino of any race were 10.88% (281) of the population.

Of the 887 households, 37.7% had children under the age of 18; 64.5% were married couples living together; 8.8% had a female householder with no husband present and 23.8% were non-families. Of all households, 19.6% were made up of individuals and 8.5% had someone living alone who was 65 years of age or older. The average household size was 2.72 and the average family size was 3.13.

26.5% of the population were under the age of 18, 6.6% from 18 to 24, 21.1% from 25 to 44, 33.9% from 45 to 64, and 12.0% who were 65 years of age or older. The median age was 42.0 years. For every 100 females, the population had 97.4 males. For every 100 females ages 18 and older there were 95.2 males.

The Census Bureau's 2006–2010 American Community Survey showed that (in 2010 inflation-adjusted dollars) median household income was $123,875 (with a margin of error of +/− $16,668) and the median family income was $145,333 (+/− $23,674). Males had a median income of $86,379 (+/− $16,014) versus $60,833 (+/− $16,980) for females. The per capita income for the borough was $61,841 (+/− $12,910). About none of families and 2.3% of the population were below the poverty line, including none of those under age 18 and 2.2% of those age 65 or over.

=== 2000 census ===
As of the 2000 United States census there were 2,433 people, 840 households, and 646 families residing in the borough. The population density was 419.5 inhabitants per square mile (162.0/km^{2}). There were 871 housing units at an average density of 150.2 per square mile (58.0/km^{2}). The racial makeup of the borough was 94.45% white, 3.12% African American, 0.08% Native American, 1.23% Asian, 0.70% from other races, and 0.41% from two or more races. Hispanic or Latino of any race were 3.78% of the population.

There were 840 households, out of which 37.1% had children under the age of 18 living with them, 69.5% were married couples living together, 5.5% had a female householder with no husband present, and 23.0% were non-families. 18.1% of all households were made up of individuals, and 8.5% had someone living alone who was 65 years of age or older. The average household size was 2.71 and the average family size was 3.11.

In the borough the population was spread out, with 26.0% under the age of 18, 5.5% from 18 to 24, 30.1% from 25 to 44, 26.3% from 45 to 64, and 12.2% who were 65 years of age or older. The median age was 40 years. For every 100 females, there were 97.8 males. For every 100 females age 18 and over, there were 97.0 males.

The median income for a household in the borough was $99,499, and the median income for a family was $118,770. Males had a median income of $62,446 versus $46,500 for females. The per capita income for the borough was $56,542. About 1.9% of families and 4.2% of the population were below the poverty line, including 2.1% of those under age 18 and 4.1% of those age 65 or over.

== Economy ==
Peapack Private Bank & Trust was founded in 1921 as Peapack-Gladstone National Bank. It operates as a commercial bank serving the local community and the Tri-State area, specializing in wealth management, investment banking, commercial and personal banking. It is publicly traded under NASDAQ with the ticker symbol PGC.

== In popular culture ==
The Gladstone train station building was re-labeled "Boston," and its surroundings were supplied with peat-moss dirt, period vehicles and extras in Victorian dress, for a 1962 movie shoot. In the Oscar-winning film The Miracle Worker, Anne Bancroft in the role of Annie Sullivan boards a long-distance steam train there to take the job as Helen Keller's teacher.

The borough was a major shooting location of the CBS soap opera Guiding Light from 2007 until the show's conclusion in 2009.

The borough was featured in The Official Preppy Handbook, alongside neighboring Basking Ridge, Bernardsville, and Far Hills.

== Sports ==
Horseback riding is very popular throughout the area. The United States Equestrian Team (USET) has its home in Gladstone.

Hamilton Farm Golf Club has been the site of the Sybase Match Play Championship since its inception in 2010, which is the only match play format event on the LPGA Tour.

The borough is home to Stronghold Soccer Club, which plays its matches at Mount St. John's on the grounds of Montgomery Academy.

== Municipal services ==
=== Emergency services ===
Policing is provided by the Peapack and Gladstone Police Department, which has a staff of nine officers and a Chief.

Fire service has been provided since 1905 by the all-volunteer Peapack and Gladstone Volunteer Fire Company, known in the Somerset County Radio System as "51 Fire". The department operates out of the fire station located on Dewey Avenue. The department operates a 2010 Pierce Arrow Pumper known as Engine 51-2 or 51-102 which acts as primary attack engine; a 2024 Ferrara Heavy Rescue known as Rescue 51 or 51-151, equipped with rescue equipment for emergencies such as confined space rescue and vehicle extrication; a 1998 Pierce Dash 2000, which acts as a sister truck to Engine 51-2, is known as Engine 51-3 or 51-103; and a 2000 Ford F-250 Brush Truck known as Brush 51 or 51-141, which responds to all brush fires in and around the borough and is equipped with foam. The department retired a 1988 Pierce Lance in 2010 and a 1995 International/Marion Heavy Rescue Truck in 2024 after many years of service.

Emergency medical services are provided by the non-profit, all-volunteer Peapack Gladstone First Aid Squad, known as "51 Rescue", based at a newly renovated location on St. Lukes Avenue. The Squad operates 2021 and 2016 Ford F450 Horton ambulances. The Squad provides around-the-clock service at no cost to its patients.

Emergency medical services are bolstered by Mobile Intensive Care Units (MICU) with paramedics from the local hospitals of Morristown Medical Center (also a regional trauma center) in Morristown and from Robert Wood Johnson University Hospital Somerset (formerly Somerset Medical Center) in Somerville. In the event of a serious trauma accident, as occurs occasionally on Route 206 which runs through the borough, the services of the New Jersey State Police North Shock Trauma Air Rescue (NorthSTAR), which is based in neighboring Bedminster, may be called upon to provide medical evacuation to a trauma center.

=== Public works ===
The Peapack-Gladstone Department of Public Works (DPW) is responsible for maintenance for the borough's buildings, snow removal, sewer inspection, as well as the general maintenance of roads and other services.

== Government ==
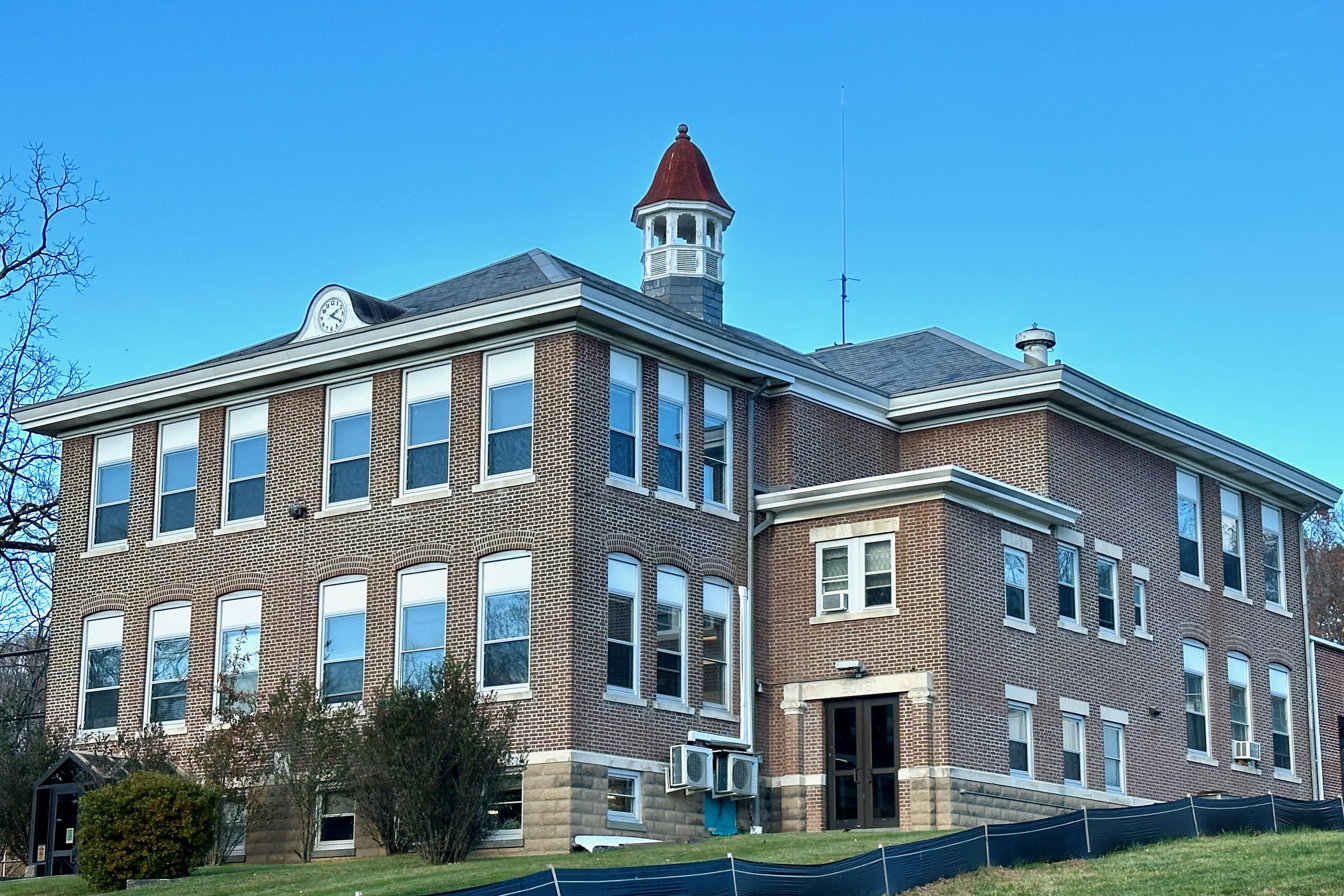
Peapack-Gladstone Municipal Complex and Public Library

=== Local government ===
Peapack-Gladstone is governed under the borough form of New Jersey municipal government, which is used in 218 municipalities (of the 564) statewide, making it the most common form of government in New Jersey. The governing body is comprised of the mayor and the borough council, with all positions elected at-large on a partisan basis as part of the November general election. The mayor is elected directly by the voters to a four-year term of office. The borough council includes six members elected to serve three-year terms on a staggered basis, with two seats coming up for election each year in a three-year cycle. The borough form of government used by Peapack-Gladstone is a "weak mayor / strong council" government in which council members act as the legislative body with the mayor presiding at meetings and voting only in the event of a tie. The mayor can veto ordinances subject to an override by a two-thirds majority vote of the council. The mayor makes committee and liaison assignments for council members, and most appointments are made by the mayor with the advice and consent of the council.

As of 2022, the mayor of Peapack-Gladstone is Independent Gregory Skinner, whose term of office ends December 31, 2022. Members of the Borough Council are Council President Mark A. Corigliano (R, 2022), GianPaolo Caminiti (R, 2022), Amy Dietrich (D, 2023), Donald Lemma (R, 2023), Jamie Murphy (D, 2024), and John Sweeney (R, 2024).

Borough offices are located at the former school building, in the same facility as the local library and police department. Municipal court is shared with Bedminster and Bernardsville. Court sessions are held in Bedminster.

=== Federal, state and county representation ===
Peapack-Gladstone is located in the 7th Congressional District and is part of New Jersey's 21st state legislative district.

For the 119th United States Congress, New Jersey's 7th congressional district is represented by Thomas Kean Jr. (R, Westfield). New Jersey is represented in the United States Senate by Democrats Cory Booker (Newark, term ends 2027) and Andy Kim (Moorestown, term ends 2031).

For the 2026–2027 session, the 21st legislative district of the New Jersey Legislature is represented in the State Senate by Jon Bramnick (R, Westfield) and in the General Assembly by Vincent Kearney (D, Garwood) and Andrew Macurdy (D, Summit).

Somerset County is governed by a five-member Board of County Commissioners, whose members are elected at-large to three-year terms of office on a staggered basis, with one or two seats coming up for election each year. At an annual reorganization meeting held in the first week of January, the board selects a Director and deputy director from among its members. As of 2025, Somerset County's County Commissioners are Director Shanel Robinson (D, Franklin Township, term as commissioner ends 2027; term as director ends 2026), Deputy Director Paul Drake (D, Hillsborough Township, term as commissioner and as deputy director ends 2026), Melonie Marano (D, Green Brook Township, 2028), Elizabeth Graner (D, Bernards Township, 2026; elected to serve an unexpired term) and Sara Sooy (D, Bedminster Township, 2027).

Constitutional officers, elected on a countywide basis are Clerk Steve Peter (D, Somerville, 2027), Sheriff Darrin Russo (D, Franklin Township, 2028) and Surrogate Bernice "Tina" Jalloh (D, Franklin Township, 2030).

=== Politics ===
As of March 2011, there were a total of 1,743 registered voters in Peapack & Gladstone, of which 283 (16.2% vs. 26.0% countywide) were registered as Democrats, 957 (54.9% vs. 25.7%) were registered as Republicans and 502 (28.8% vs. 48.2%) were registered as Unaffiliated. There was one voter registered to another party. Among the borough's 2010 Census population, 67.5% (vs. 60.4% in Somerset County) were registered to vote, including 91.8% of those ages 18 and over (vs. 80.4% countywide).

United States presidential election results for Peapack-Gladstone
Year	Republican		Democratic		Third party(ies)	
Year	No.	%	No.	%	No.	%
2024	750	48.70%	756	49.09%	34	2.21%
2020	795	48.83%	805	49.45%	28	1.72%
2016	722	51.76%	620	44.44%	53	3.80%
2012	796	62.28%	464	36.31%	18	1.41%
2008	790	59.09%	526	39.34%	21	1.57%
2004	860	65.75%	430	32.87%	18	1.38%
2000	742	65.84%	346	30.70%	39	3.46%

In the 2012 presidential election, Republican Mitt Romney received 62.3% of the vote (796 cast), ahead of Democrat Barack Obama with 36.3% (464 votes), and other candidates with 1.4% (18 votes), among the 1,279 ballots cast by the borough's 1,865 registered voters (1 ballot was spoiled), for a turnout of 68.6%. In the 2008 presidential election, Republican John McCain received 790 votes (58.6% vs. 46.1% countywide), ahead of Democrat Barack Obama with 526 votes (39.0% vs. 52.1%) and other candidates with 21 votes (1.6% vs. 1.1%), among the 1,349 ballots cast by the borough's 1,681 registered voters, for a turnout of 80.2% (vs. 78.7% in Somerset County). In the 2004 presidential election, Republican George W. Bush received 860 votes (65.4% vs. 51.5% countywide), ahead of Democrat John Kerry with 430 votes (32.7% vs. 47.2%) and other candidates with 18 votes (1.4% vs. 0.9%), among the 1,314 ballots cast by the borough's 1,566 registered voters, for a turnout of 83.9% (vs. 81.7% in the whole county).

Gubernatorial election results for Peapack-Gladstone
Year	Republican		Democratic		Third party(ies)	
Year	No.	%	No.	%	No.	%
2025	658	53.37%	570	46.23%	5	0.41%
2021	647	60.52%	409	38.26%	13	1.22%
2017	597	62.06%	354	36.80%	11	1.14%
2013	662	79.19%	161	19.26%	13	1.56%
2009	657	65.24%	205	20.36%	145	14.40%
2005	622	72.24%	214	24.85%	25	2.90%

In the 2013 gubernatorial election, Republican Chris Christie received 79.2% of the vote (662 cast), ahead of Democrat Barbara Buono with 19.3% (161 votes), and other candidates with 1.6% (13 votes), among the 847 ballots cast by the borough's 1,924 registered voters (11 ballots were spoiled), for a turnout of 44.0%. In the 2009 gubernatorial election, Republican Chris Christie received 657 votes (64.9% vs. 55.8% countywide), ahead of Democrat Jon Corzine with 205 votes (20.3% vs. 34.1%), Independent Chris Daggett with 140 votes (13.8% vs. 8.7%) and other candidates with 5 votes (0.5% vs. 0.7%), among the 1,012 ballots cast by the borough's 1,712 registered voters, yielding a 59.1% turnout (vs. 52.5% in the county).

United States Senate election results for Peapack-Gladstone1
Year	Republican		Democratic		Third party(ies)	
Year	No.	%	No.	%	No.	%
2024	766	51.17%	712	47.56%	19	1.27%
2018	761	59.59%	482	37.74%	34	2.66%
2012	774	63.34%	413	33.80%	35	2.86%
2006	611	66.92%	282	30.89%	20	2.19%

United States Senate election results for Peapack-Gladstone2
Year	Republican		Democratic		Third party(ies)	
Year	No.	%	No.	%	No.	%
2020	873	53.86%	739	45.59%	9	0.56%
2014	479	65.71%	236	32.37%	14	1.92%
2013	388	65.21%	201	33.78%	6	1.01%
2008	853	67.64%	375	29.74%	33	2.62%

== Education ==
Students in public school for pre-kindergarten through twelfth grade attend the schools of the Somerset Hills School District, a regional school district serving students from Bernardsville, Far Hills and Peapack-Gladstone, along with those from Bedminster who attend the district's high school as part of a sending/receiving relationship. As of the 2022–23 school year, the district, comprised of three schools, had an enrollment of 1,761 students and 151.3 classroom teachers (on an FTE basis), for a student–teacher ratio of 11.6:1. Schools in the district (with 2022–23 enrollment data from the National Center for Education Statistics) are Marion T. Bedwell Elementary School with 453 students in grades PreK–4, Bernardsville Middle School with 458 students in grades 5–8 and Bernards High School with 812 students in grades 9–12. The district's board of education is comprised of nine elected members (plus one appointed member representing Bedminster) who set policy and oversee the fiscal and educational operation of the district through its administration. The nine elected seats on the board are allocated to the constituent municipalities based on population, with two seats allocated to Peapack-Gladstone.

Gill St. Bernard's School is a private, nonsectarian, coeducational day school, serving students in pre-kindergarten through twelfth grade. The Cottage School and Cottage Elementary Schools serve students in preschool through the early elementary grades.

== Transportation ==
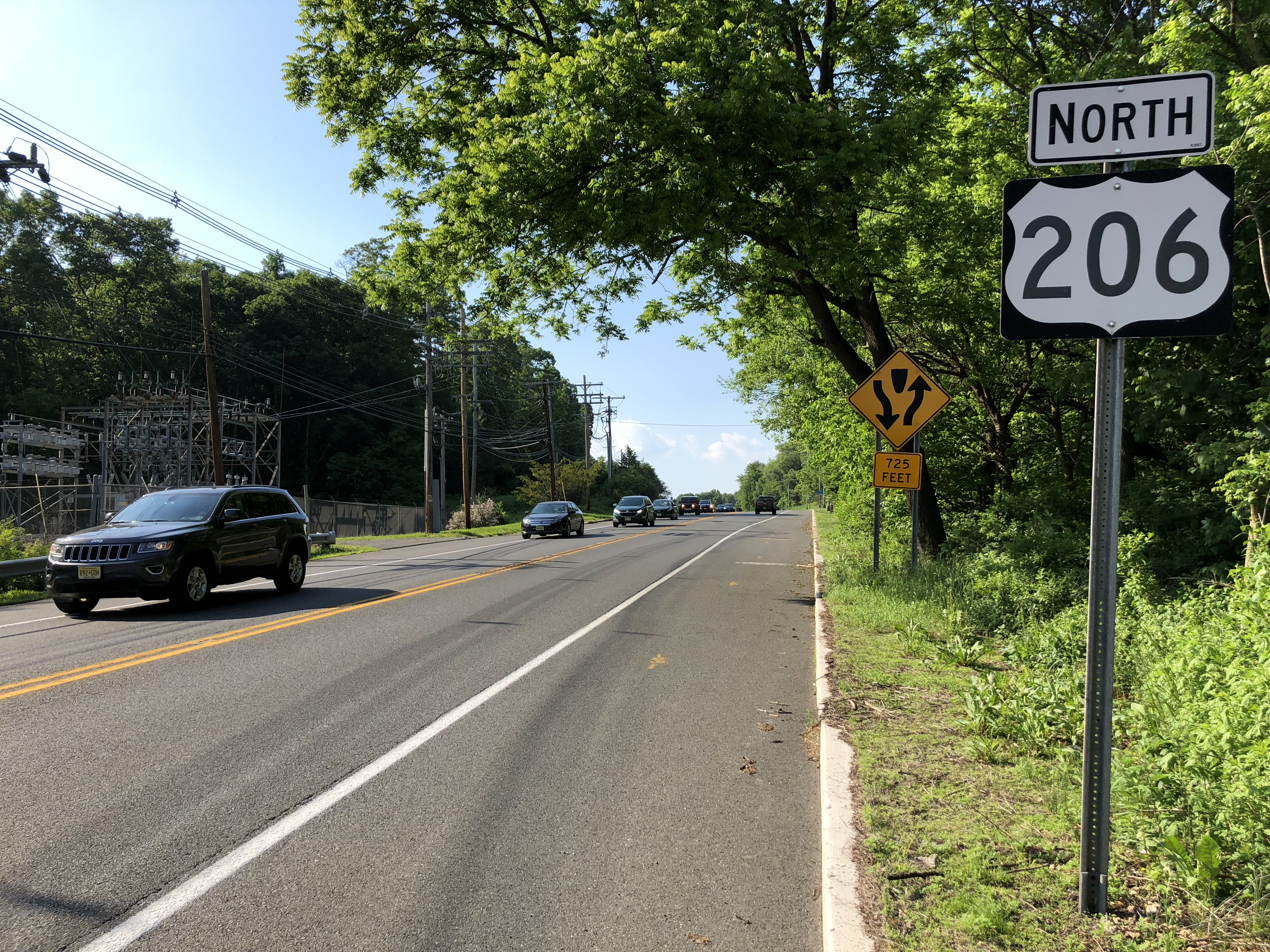
U.S. Route 206 in Peapack-Gladstone

=== Roads and highways ===
As of May 2010, the borough had a total of 25.45 miles (40.96 km) of roadways, of which 18.20 miles (29.29 km) were maintained by the municipality, 5.17 miles (8.32 km) by Somerset County and 2.08 miles (3.35 km) by the New Jersey Department of Transportation.

U.S. Route 206 is the most prominent highway directly serving the borough, connecting to points north and south. County Route 512 also serves the borough, extending east–west through the area. Interstate 287 and Interstate 78 are both accessible in neighboring Bedminster.

=== Public transportation ===
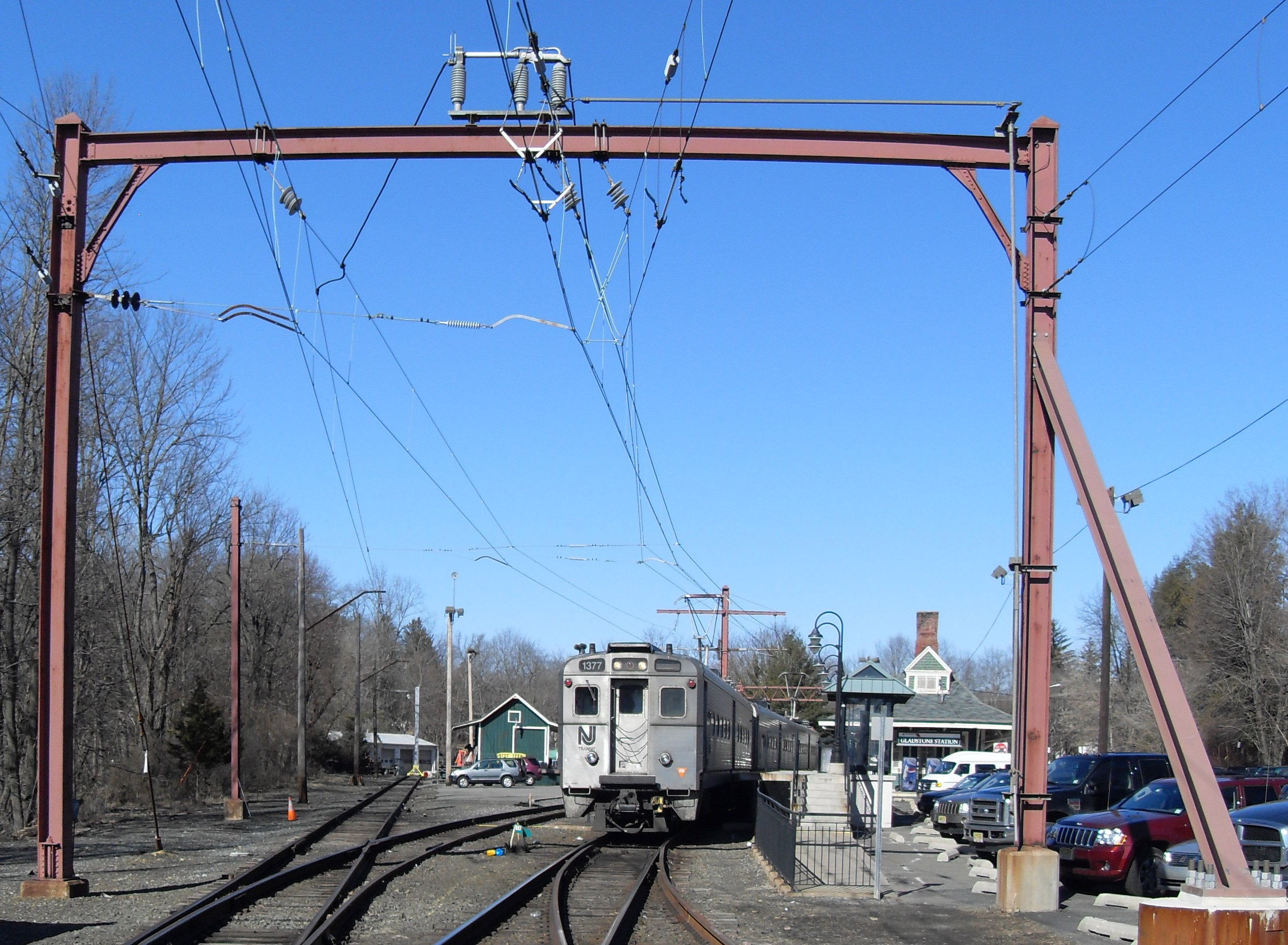
Gladstone NJT terminus

NJ Transit's Gladstone station is the terminus of the Gladstone Branch of the Morris and Essex Lines, taking many of the borough's commuters to Hoboken and New York Penn Station in Midtown Manhattan daily. Peapack has its own station 1 mile (1.6 km) before the terminus.

== Notable people ==
People who were born in, residents of, or otherwise closely associated with Peapack-Gladstone include:

- Charles E. Apgar (1865–1950), business executive and amateur radio operator best known for making early recordings of coded German radio transmissions at the start of World War I
- Phillip R. Bennett (born 1948), convicted financial fraudster
- C. Ledyard Blair (1867–1949), investment banker and yachtsman
- Susane Colasanti (born 1973), author of realistic, contemporary teen novels
- William R. Cox (1901–1988), prolific writer of short stories and Western and mystery novels mainly for the pulp and paperback markets written under multiple pseudonyms
- Meg Donnelly (born 2000), actress who appeared in the ABC sitcom American Housewife and in the 2018 Disney Channel Original Movie Zombies and its 2020 sequel, Zombies 2
- Louise Fatio (1904–1993), writer of children's books, best known for her picture book The Happy Lion, with her illustrator husband Roger Duvoisin
- Jason Gore (born 1974), PGA Tour professional golfer who is the Senior Director of Player Relations for the United States Golf Association
- Hassan II of Morocco (1929–1999), King of Morocco
- Sarah Hirshland (born 1975), chief executive officer of the United States Olympic Committee
- Thomas Kiernan (1933-2003), writer who was the author of a biographies that featured figures including Laurence Olivier, Jane Fonda, John Steinbeck, and Yasser Arafat.
- Kate Macy Ladd (1863–1945), philanthropist who founded and endowed the Josiah Macy Jr. Foundation in honor of her father
- Jacqueline Kennedy Onassis (1929–1994), former First Lady of the United States
- Holly Ponichtera, immunologist who competed as a figure skater at Dartmouth College
- Orin R. Smith, former chairman and CEO of Engelhard Corporation
- Richard B. Sellars (1915–2010), Chairman and CEO of Johnson & Johnson
- Kate Whitman Annis (born c. 1998), general manager of the Metropolitan Riveters of the National Women's Hockey League
