= Thomas Kiernan =

Thomas Kiernan may refer to:

- Tommy Kiernan (1918–1991), Scottish footballer
- Thomas Kiernan (biographer) (1933–2003), American writer
- Tom Kiernan (born 1939), Ireland rugby union player
