= Paul Sracic =

Paul Albert Sracic (born March 23, 1962) is an American political scientist, writer, and political analyst known for his analysis of US politics, working class voters, and trade issues. He chairs the Department of Politics and International Relations at Youngstown State University in Ohio.

== Early life and education ==
Sracic grew up in the Gladstone section of Peapack-Gladstone, New Jersey, graduating from Bernards High School in 1980. Four years later, he graduated from Albright College, with a degree in Political Science and Economics. Sracic earned a Ph.D. in political science from Rutgers University, where he studied with the American political theorist, Wilson Carey McWilliams. Sracic also studied constitutional law with Walter F. Murphy at Princeton University.

== Professorship ==
In 1992, Sracic joined the Department of Politics and International Relations at Youngstown State University. He became chair of the department in 2006. In 2009, Sracic received a Fulbright scholarship to teach in Japan at the University of Tokyo and Sophia University. Sracic returned to Japan in 2012, as part of Prime Minister Noda's Visiting Experts program.

== Writings ==
Sracic has authored or coauthored three books, including the Encyclopedia of American Parties, Campaigns, and Elections; San Antonio v. Rodriquez and the Pursuit of Equal Education (part of a series that won the Scribes Award for legal writing in 2008); and Ohio Politics and Government. He is a frequent contributor to CNN.com, and also has written for The Washington Post, Bloomberg News, The Atlantic and The Diplomat.

== Controversies and predictions ==
Sracic's defense of the American Electoral College system, based largely on the writings of Daniel Patrick Moynihan, has been criticized by Hendrik Hertzberg of the New Yorker. Sracic predicted the role of the Electoral College in the 2016 U.S. presidential election, and noted that Trump's appeal in traditional Democratic working class strongholds throughout the Midwest created a potential path to victory. Sracic was chastised by some national columnists, including Connie Schultz, for his election predictions. However, Sracic continued to argue for Trump's popularity among white, working-class voters.

Sracic was an early skeptic of the potential for the U.S. to ratify the Trans-Pacific Partnership. He has also expressed doubts, based on his understanding of American politics and concerns regarding the separation of powers, about the U.S. commitment to defend Japanese administered Senkaku Islands, should they be attacked by China
