= Katie Meyler =

American activist

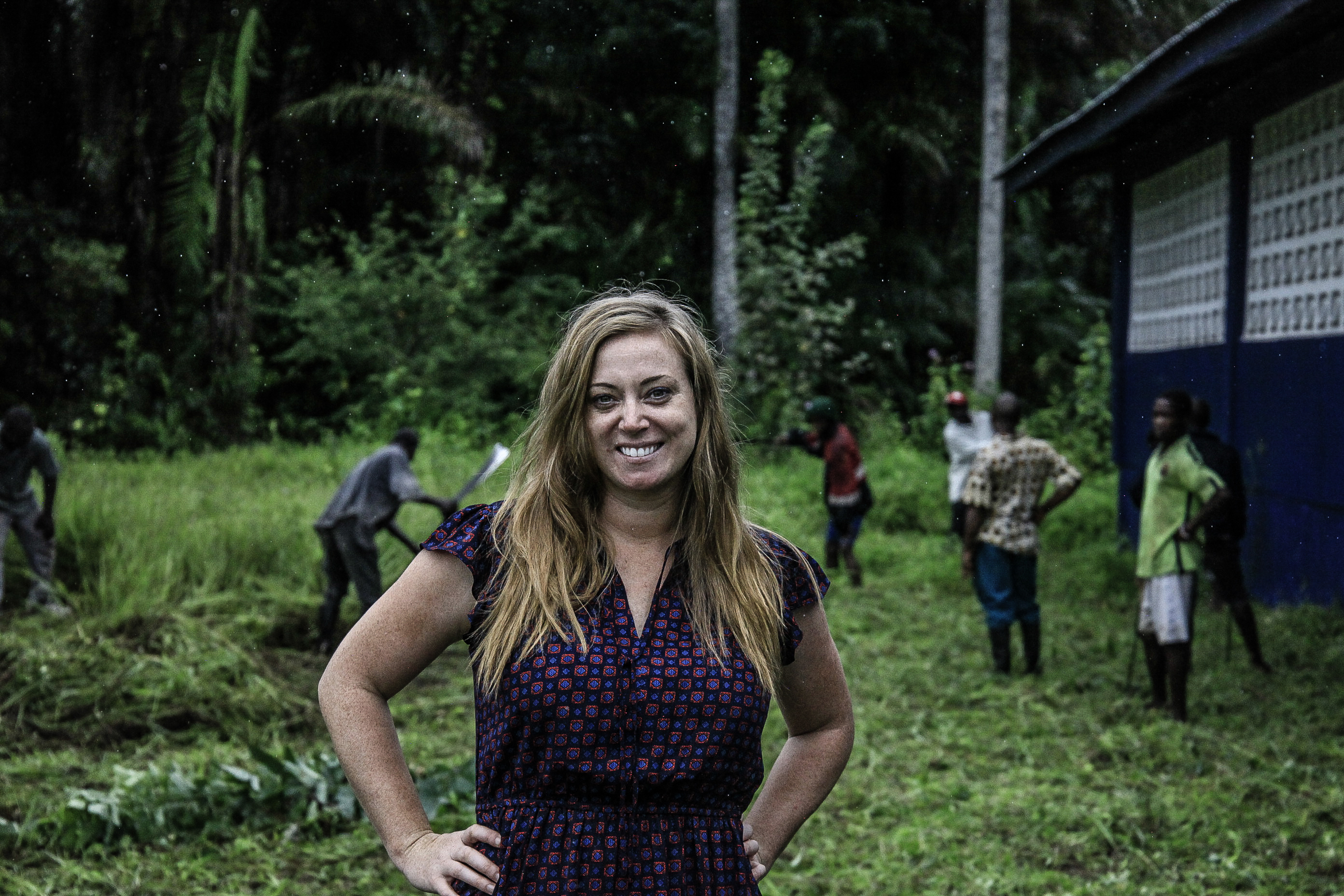
- Katie Meyler in Liberia
- Born: September 7, 1982 (age 43); Morristown, New Jersey
- Education: Bernards High School
- Alma mater: North Central University
- Organization: More Than Me Foundation
- Awards: Time Person of the Year (2014); Shorty Award for Best Activist (2015)

Katie Ann Meyler (born September 7, 1982) is an American activist who is the founder of the More Than Me Foundation, an organization that works to educate young women in Liberia in the midst of the West African Ebola virus epidemic. She has been recognized as one of the Ebola fighters chosen as the 2014 Time Person of the Year and won at the 2015 Shorty Awards for Best Activist. However, she has received criticism for failing to protect the young women in her care from sexual abuse by her lover, an accusation which was extensively researched and reported on in 2018 by Time Magazine and ProPublica. Meyler resigned from the organization as a result of the investigation.

== Early life ==
Meyler was born in Morristown, New Jersey and grew up with her mother, grandmother, and sister in Bernardsville, New Jersey, starting at age 6 after her parents divorced, and graduated from Bernards High School. She graduated from Raritan Valley Community College in 2002 and graduated from North Central University in 2005.

== More Than Me Foundation ==
Meyler was the founder and chief executive officer of More Than Me. When she created the organization in 2011, she was homeless. She sold her eggs to a fertility clinic to keep herself funded and raised $60,000 over the Internet to pay for her work in Africa. Her organization received a grant for $1 million from J.P. Morgan Chase that was used to establish the More Than Me Academy, which opened in 2013 as the nation's only school for girls that did not charge tuition, with the mission serve more than 100 at-risk young women in West Point a neighborhood in the Liberian capital of Monrovia that is one of the city's most densely populated slums. Many of the young girls served by the organization were frequent targets of sexual exploitation in order to meet their most fundamental survival needs. When Ebola broke out in August 2014, she and her staff were forced to evacuate the country, only to return later that month. At the height of the Ebola epidemic, the school was forced to close under a Presidential mandate and focused on serving the survival needs of its students. She helped organize caregivers in West Point, providing boots and payments to health workers serving the area, and ultimately obtaining donations to acquire an ambulance. She worked with the World Health Organization and Médecins Sans Frontières to ensure that health workers were properly trained to deal with the crisis. The school was ultimately repurposed as an orphanage to serve the needs of children who had lost their parents to Ebola.

Time recognized her as a Time Person of the Year which was given to Ebola fighters.

== Child sexual abuse scandal ==
In October 2018, Meyler stepped down from her position as CEO of More Than Me, as a result a report published by Time and ProPublica that found her Liberian co-founder Macintosh Johnson had raped girls attending the foundation's academy. 10 girls eventually decided to press charges against Johnson. The report documented an attempted cover up of the girls' allegations of rape, which was partly blamed on Meyler's intimate relationship with the rapist, Macintosh Johnson. The rapist later was discovered to have HIV/AIDS, and a number of the girls raped by Johnson at the school became HIV-positive. The report strongly indicated that Meyler was involved in an attempted coverup of rape allegations, hiring a PR specialist to issue a press release which deleted or edited blog posts documenting Johnson's role in founding the organization. The report indicates Meyler was derelict in her role as CEO, and her inaction resulted in the continued rape of adolescent girls attending the More Than Me Academy. When, in a 2016 interview with one of Liberia's most popular radio hosts, the host brought up the issue of the charities 'nightmare' and 'misfortune', Meyler explained how, in the first year of the school, "one of our students had come forward....She shared, uh, that she had been in this relationship with one of our staff members. …”. This was in fact, according to the report, a girl who had told authorities her rape by Johnson began at 11 years old.

In May 2019, More Than Me released a report by law firm McLane Middleton that identifies significant deficits in the charity's policies, governance and administration, and strongly criticizes the actions of Meyler – noting that "The leader of an organization entrusted with the care of children must understand the fundamental steps to be taken when abuse of a child is suspected", and that "Meyler’s good intentions do not excuse the devastating impact of her inadequate actions on the vulnerable girls in her care".

In April 2019, Meyler permanently resigned from her post using her personal Facebook profile to announce her decision to step down as CEO of MTM, in the wake of the conclusions of an independent panel, which concluded that the charity missed opportunities to prevent the rape of its students. The charity and Meyler were said to be more focused on PR aspects of the scandal rather than protecting their students from sexual assault. The panel, which conducted its work pro bono, called the board's conduct an “astonishing failure of oversight and/or refusal to accept responsibility and be accountable.” ProPublica and Time Magazine noted at the end of their report that Meyler's charity "did not identify any inaccuracies" in their report.
