= Bernards High School =

High school in Somerset County, New Jersey, US

Location
- 25 Olcott Avenue; Bernardsville, Somerset County, New Jersey 07924; United States; 40°43′15″N 74°33′56″W

Information
- Type: Public high school
- Established: 1907; 119 years ago
- School district: Somerset Hills School District
- NCES School ID: 340000900176
- Principal: Scott Neigel
- Faculty: 68.8 FTEs
- Grades: 9–12
- Enrollment: 751 (as of 2024–25)
- Student to teacher ratio: 10.9:1
- Colors: Crimson; White
- Athletics conference: Skyland Conference (general); Big Central Football Conference (football)
- Team name: Mountaineers
- Publication: The Crimson
- Yearbook: The Bernardian
- Website: bhs.shsd.org
- Last updated: November 1, 2019; 6 years ago

Bernards High School is a comprehensive four-year regional public high school serving students in ninth through twelfth grades in Somerset County, in the U.S. state of New Jersey. The school is part of the Somerset Hills School District, a regional K–12 school district that consists of the participating municipalities of Bernardsville, Far Hills and Peapack-Gladstone. Students from Bedminster are sent to the district's high school for grades 9-12 as part of a sending/receiving relationship with the Bedminster Township School District. The school is located in Bernardsville, within walking distance from the main section of Bernardsville. The school is overseen by the New Jersey Department of Education.

As of the 2024–25 school year, the school had an enrollment of 751 students and 68.8 classroom teachers (on an FTE basis), for a student–teacher ratio of 10.9:1. There were 117 students (15.6% of enrollment) eligible for free lunch and 19 (2.5% of students) eligible for reduced-cost lunch.

== Awards, recognition and rankings ==
In its listing of "America's Best High Schools 2016", Bernards High was ranked 88th out of 500 best high schools in the country; it was ranked 18th among all high schools in New Jersey and fifth among the state's non-magnet schools.

In its 2013 report on "America's Best High Schools", The Daily Beast ranked the school 235th in the nation among participating public high schools and 18th among schools in New Jersey. The school was ranked 169th in the nation and 12th in New Jersey on the list of "America's Best High Schools 2012" prepared by The Daily Beast / Newsweek, with rankings based primarily on graduation rate, matriculation rate for college and number of Advanced Placement / International Baccalaureate courses taken per student, with lesser factors based on average scores on the SAT / ACT, average AP/IB scores and the number of AP/IB courses available to students.

In the 2011 "Ranking America's High Schools" issue by The Washington Post, the school was ranked 6th in New Jersey and 288th nationwide. The school was ranked 198th in Newsweek's 2009 ranking of the top 1,500 high schools in the United States and was the fourth-ranked school in New Jersey, with 3.023 IB tests taken in 2008 per graduating senior and 49% of all graduating seniors passing at least one IB exam. In 2008, the school was ranked 518th nationwide. In Newsweek's May 22, 2007 issue, ranking the country's top high schools, Bernards High School was listed in 218th place, the sixth-highest ranked school in New Jersey. The school was listed in 141st place, the fourth highest ranked school in New Jersey, in Newsweek's May 8, 2006, issue, listing the Top 1,200 High Schools in The United States.

The school was the 15th-ranked public high school in New Jersey out of 339 schools statewide in New Jersey Monthly magazine's September 2014 cover story on the state's "Top Public High Schools", using a new ranking methodology. The school had been ranked 11th in the state of 328 schools in 2012, after being ranked 32nd in 2010 out of 322 schools listed. The magazine ranked the school 36th in 2008 out of 316 schools. The school was ranked 50th in the magazine's September 2006 issue, which included 316 schools across the state. Schooldigger.com ranked the school 52nd out of 381 public high schools statewide in its 2011 rankings (an increase of 16 positions from the 2010 ranking) which were based on the combined percentage of students classified as proficient or above proficient on the mathematics (92.3%) and language arts literacy (97.4%) components of the High School Proficiency Assessment (HSPA).

== Athletics ==
The Bernards High School Mountaineers compete in the Skyland Conference, which is comprised of public and private high schools covering Hunterdon, Somerset and Warren counties, and operates under the jurisdiction of the New Jersey State Interscholastic Athletic Association (NJSIAA). Bernards joined the Skyland Conference in the 2006–07 school year, after having been in the Colonial Hills Conference for many years. With 644 students in grades 10-12, the school was classified by the NJSIAA for the 2019–20 school year as Group II for most athletic competition purposes, which included schools with an enrollment of 486 to 758 students in that grade range. The football team competes in Division 2A of the Big Central Football Conference, which includes 60 public and private high schools in Hunterdon, Middlesex, Somerset, Union and Warren counties, which are broken down into 10 divisions by size and location. The school was classified by the NJSIAA as Group II North for football for 2024–2026, which included schools with 484 to 683 students.

The school participates as the host school / lead agency for a joint ice hockey team with Middlesex High School and Somerville High School.

The boys track team won the spring / outdoor track state championship in Group II in 1937, 1948, 1971, 1981, 1982, 1983 (was later disqualified as team champion), 1984 and 1985, and won in Group I in 1947, 1986.

The boys cross country team won the Group II state title in 1965, 1977, 1985, 1987 and won the Group I title in 1966, 1968–1970, 1972, 1974–1976, 1978–1984, 1998, 2003 and 2004. The program's 23 state titles are the second-most of any school in the state and the 14 consecutive titles won from 1974 to 1987 are the longest streak of any school statewide. The team won the Meet of Champions in 1981, 1982 and 1985. The three MoC titles are tied for third-most of any school in the state.

The girls tennis team won the Group I state championship in 1976 (defeating runner-up Kinnelon High School in the tournament final) and 2003 (vs. Point Pleasant Beach High School), and in Group II in 2005 (vs. Governor Livingston High School). The 1976 team won the Group I title with a 4-1 win against Kinnelon in the final match of the playoffs. After defeating Leonia High School 3-2 in the semifinals, the 2003 team won the Group I title against Point Pleasant Beach by 5-0 in the tournament finals at Mercer County Park.

The boys tennis team won the Group I state championship in 1977 (against Glen Ridge High School in the final match of the tournament), in 1982 (vs. Verona High School), and in Group II in 1978 (vs. Tenafly High School).

The girls cross country team won the Group I state championship from 1978 to 1984, 1986 and 1997, and won in Group II in 1985. The program's 12 state championships are second-most in the state and the program holds the longest streak statewide, with 10 consecutive titles won from 1977 to 1986.

The girls spring track team was the Group I state champion in 1982–1985, 1987 and 1993. The program's six group titles are tied for tenth-most in New Jersey.

The boys track team won the indoor track championship in Group I in 1983, 1985 and 1989, and in Group II in 1986. The girls track team won the Group I title in 1983–1985, 1987, 2009 and 2010, and won in Group II in 1986; the seven titles won by the girls program is the fifth-most of any school in New Jersey.

The field hockey team won the Group I state championship in 1994 against runner-up Madison High School.

The girls team won the indoor relay championship in Group II title in 1985, in Group III in 1986 and in Group I in 2009, 2011 and 2012. The boys track team won the Group II title in 1985 and the Group III title in 1986.

The boys soccer team won the Group I state title in 1989 (against playoff finals opponent David Brearley High School) and won in Group II in 2006 (vs. Haddonfield Memorial High School), 2011 (vs. Holmdel High School), 2016 (vs. Newton High School) and 2019 (vs. Delran High School). The 2006-07 Bernards boys soccer team won the Skyland Conference championship in their inaugural year there. The team won the Group II state championship with a 2–1 win over Ramsey High School in the semifinals and a 3–2 win against Haddonfield Memorial High School in the finals.

The boys' basketball team won the Central Jersey Group I championship in 1981 and 2000.

The girls' basketball team won the Central Jersey Group 1 championship in 1997 with a 66-32 against Highland Park High School in the finals.

The ice hockey team won the McInnis Cup in 2001.

The boys fencing team was the overall state championship in 2006 and 2008, was épée team winner in 2006, 2008, 2015, 2017 and 2018, and was sabre team winner in 2007. With six, the program has won the second-most squad titles of any school. The team finished 1st in 2006 and 1st in 2008.

The girls fencing team won the overall state title in 2007, was épée team winner in 2008, sabre team winner in 2010, 2013 and 2018–2020, and foil team winner in 2014. The program's six squad titles are the third-most in the state. The team defeated Columbia High School by a score of 16-11 in 2007 to take the program's first state title.

The girls' track team was successful in the 1980s, but had been dismantled in 1989 because of budget deficits. The program was resurrected in 2000 and the team has won multiple conference titles and championships. They won the Indoor NJSIAA State Group I Relays along with the Indoor NJSIAA North I Group I Sectional Championships and the Indoor NJSIAA State Group I Championships in 2009 and 2010, the seventh group title won by the program in its history. The girls' track team had four All-Americans in 2010, with its 4x800 team taking 5th place at the New Balance Nationals track meet, with the 7th fastest time in the nation, breaking the Somerset County record and was the fastest time in New Jersey that year.

The 2017 girls lacrosse team finished the season with a record of 20-3 after winning the Group II state championship, defeating Haddonfield Memorial High School by score of 15-5 in the tournament final.

== Extracurricular activities ==
In the second semester of 2006–07, the Bernards Mountaineers Marching Band was invited to travel to perform in the state's second-largest Mardi Gras parade in Houma, Louisiana, a community that was devastated by Hurricane Katrina, to recognize the five truckloads of supplies that had been sent by Bernards residents to aid the community in its recovery efforts.

== History ==
The following historical synopsis derives from Among the Blue Hills...Bernardsville...a History, published by the Bernardsville History Book Committee, 1991. "On January 26, 1926, a Citizen's Committee was chosen to work with the Board of Education.....The Committee reported that the two existing buildings contained sixteen classrooms, for two classes of each of the eight grades. It was believed that this would be adequate for some time. In order to provide for the special equipment and facilities needed for a high school program, the building of a new high school would be the logical solution....The building was completed and occupied in 1927."

From the school's certification in February 2002 until the end of the 2008-2009 school year, the school offered students the opportunity to participate in the International Baccalaureate Diploma Program (IB), a comprehensive two-year curriculum pursued by students during junior and senior years. Students took a course of studies in six academic areas. Successful completion of an IB Diploma could lead students to earn college credit. Enrollment was highly selective and honors credit was earned. Students had to take a variety of internal and external assessments. The school had to end the program due to the incoming budget cuts in the next fiscal year from the then new governorship of Chris Christie. According to NJ.com, many residents were satisfied with the budget cuts. However, others felt the budget decisions were painful, and then-superintendent Peter Miller said, "I feel like I'm getting the rug pulled out from underneath me," and that the school "had the money available." The school was one of only 16 schools in New Jersey to offer the IB program at the time. Advanced Placement (AP) courses are still offered, which may also lead to college credit.

== Administration ==
The school's principal is Scott Neigel, who was appointed to the position in 2012. Core members of the school's administration include the two assistant principals.

== Notable alumni ==
- Roger Bart (born 1962, class of 1980), Tony award-winning actor
- Martin Blumenson (1918–2005) military historian whose works include an authoritative biography of General George S. Patton.
- Philip Capice (1931–2009, class of 1948), Emmy award-winning television producer of TV shows, including Eight is Enough and the first nine seasons of the prime-time soap opera Dallas
- Susane Colasanti (born 1973), author of realistic, contemporary teen novels
- J. Geils (born 1946 as John W. Geils Jr., class of 1964), musician, J. Geils of The J. Geils Band
- Jon Hinck (born 1954, class of 1972), environmentalist, lawyer and politician who served as a member of the Maine House of Representatives
- Bill Kirchiro (born 1940), offensive guard who played in the NFL for the Baltimore Colts
- Andrew McCarthy (born 1962), actor, part of the 1980s Brat Pack, attended for a portion of the time his family lived in Bernardsville
- Katie Meyler (born 1982, class of 2000), 2014's Time Person of the Year (Ebola Fighters)
- Bob Nash (1892–1977), pioneering football player in the earliest days of the National Football League
- Susan W. Pope (born 1942, class of 1961), member of the Massachusetts House of Representatives
- Erich Schwer (born 1993, class of 2011), winner of the 19th season of The Bachelorette
- Perry Scott (1917–1988), former NFL player for the Detroit Lions
- Paul Sracic (born 1962, class of 1980), political scientist, writer, and political analyst
- Carol Stiff (class of 1979), women's basketball executive, who is vice president of programming and acquisitions at ESPN and president of the Women's Basketball Hall of Fame's board of directors
- Meryl Streep (born 1949, class of 1967), Academy Award-winning actress
- John Sullivan (1941–2023, class of 1958), former Major League Baseball catcher and coach
- Jean Villepique (class of 1991), actress known for her roles in BoJack Horseman, A.P. Bio and Up All Night
- Ryan Scott Weber (born 1980, class of 1998), filmmaker
- Mark Wetmore (born 1953), cross country and track coach who specializes in middle-distance and long-distance running
