= Susane Colasanti =

American writer

- Born: May 1, 1973 (age 53); New Jersey
- Education: University of Pennsylvania, New York University
- Occupation: Author
- Writing career
- Period: 2006–present
- Genre: Young adult fiction
- Website: susanecolasanti.com

Susane Colasanti (born May 1, 1973) is an American author of young-adult fiction and a former high-school science teacher. She has published 11 young-adult titles since 2006. She lives in New York City.

== Biography ==
=== Education and teaching career ===
Colasanti grew up in Peapack-Gladstone, New Jersey. She attended Bernards High School in Bernardsville, and then attended the University of Pennsylvania in Philadelphia, where she majored in Astrophysics/Earth and Space Science with a minor in Psychology. During her senior year, she posed for Playboy's "Women of the Ivy League" pictorial, which was published in the magazine's October 1995 issue.

Colasanti moved to Manhattan in 1996, completed a master's degree from New York University in science education and physics teaching, and worked for 10 years as a high-school teacher of earth science, physics, and meteorology in Manhattan and the South Bronx.

=== Writing career ===
Her first novel, When It Happens, was published in 2006. In 2007, she left her teaching position to become a full-time writer. She has since written 10 other young adult novels, including the City Love series. She lives in New York City.

== Books ==
- When It Happens, New York : Viking, 2006. ISBN 9780670060290 In 842 libraries according to WorldCat.
  - translated into German as Falling in love : die Liebe kommt ganz unverhofft
  - Translated into Polish by Marcin Górecki as Gdy nadejdzie czas, 2011
- Take Me There, New York : Viking, 2008. ISBN 9780670063338 In 688 libraries according to WorldCat.
  - Translated into Spanish by Sara Cano Fernández as Llévame allí, 2011
  - Translated into German by Barbara Abedi as Take me there eine Geschichte zum Verlieben
  - Translated into French by Madeleine Nasalik as La pluie, les garçons et autres choses mystérieuses
- Waiting For You, New York : Viking, 2009. ISBN 9780670011308 In 706 libraries according to WorldCat.
  - Translated into Turkish by Süleyman Karakan & Nihal Kuşhan as Ne zaman geleceksin, 2009
  - Translated into German by Barbara Abedi as Waiting for you Geschichte über die Liebe,
  - Translated into Polish as Gdy nadejdzie czas
  - Translated into Brazilian Portuguese as Esperando por você
- Something Like Fate, New York : Viking, 2010 ISBN 9780670011469 In 754 libraries according to WorldCat.
  - Translated into Spanish as El novio de mi mejor amiga / Something like fate
  - Translated into Brazilian Portuguese as Tipo destino
  - Translated into Indonesian as When it happens = saat hal itu terjadi
- So Much Closer, New York : Viking, 2011. ISBN 9780670012244 In 616 libraries according to WorldCat.
  - Translated into Brazilian Portuguese as Bem mais perto
- Keep Holding On New York : Viking, 2012. ISBN 9780670012251 In 736 libraries according to WorldCat.
- All I Need. New York : Viking, 2013. ISBN 9780670014231 In 97 libraries according to WorldCat. (as of May 2013)
