= White Snow, Bright Snow =

1947 picture book by Alvin Tresselt

- Author: Alvin Tresselt
- Illustrator: Roger Duvoisin
- Genre: Children's picture book
- Publisher: Lothrop
- Publication date: 1947
- Publication place: United States
- ISBN: 0-688-08294-7
- OCLC: 17675801
- Dewey Decimal: [E] 19
- LC Class: PZ7.T732 Wh 1988

White Snow, Bright Snow is a 1947 children's book written by Alvin Tresselt and illustrated by Roger Duvoisin. Released by Lothrop Publishers, it was the recipient of the Caldecott Medal for illustration in 1948.

== Plot summary ==
At the first snowfall of the year, all the grown-ups do their usual things when a snowstorm comes, while the children are filled with wonder.

Awards
Preceded by The Little Island	Caldecott Medal recipient 1948	Succeeded by The Big Snow
