= Moses Craig Lime Kilns =

- U.S. National Register of Historic Places
- New Jersey Register of Historic Places
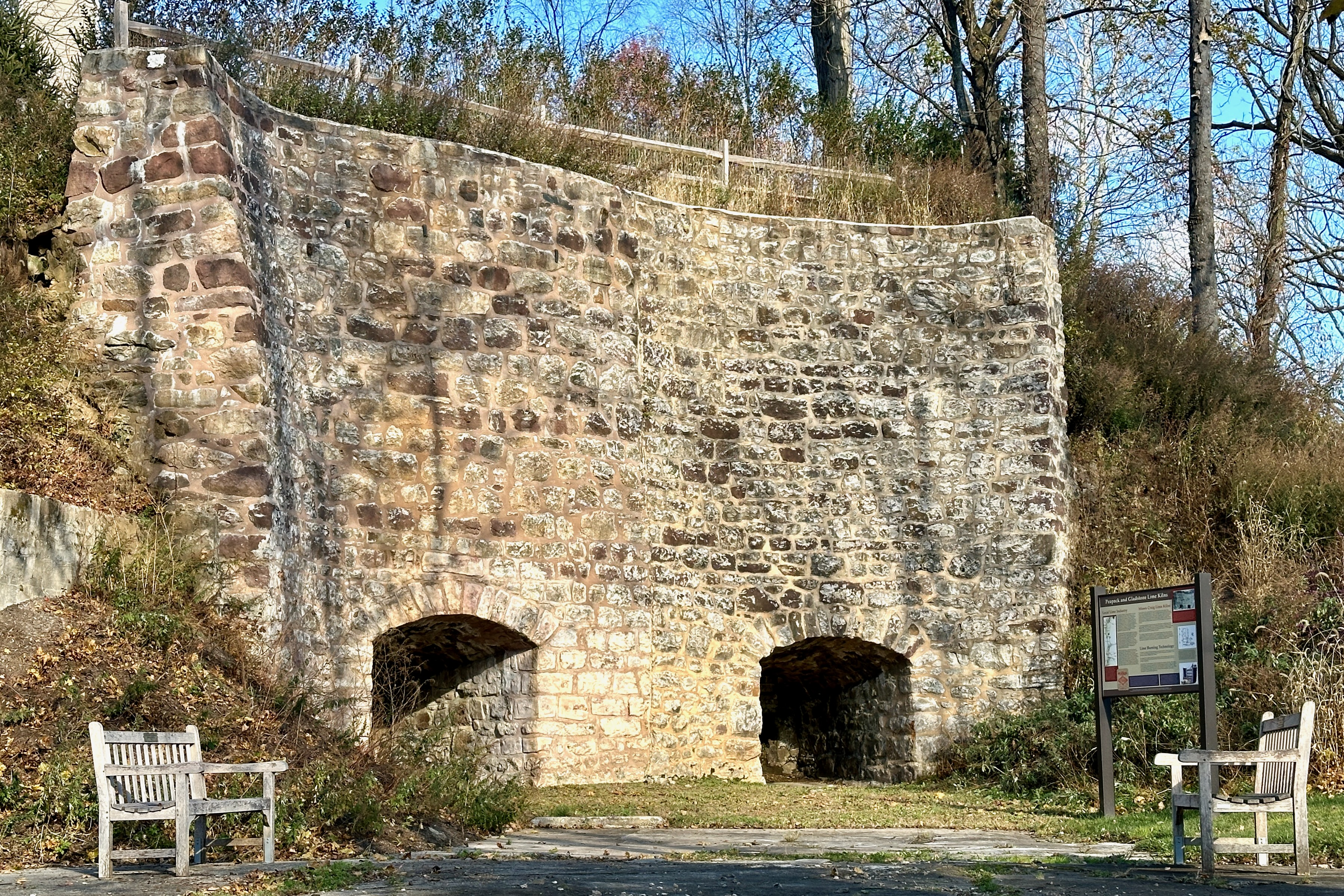

- Location within Somerset County, New Jersey Location within New Jersey Location within the United States
- Location: 122 Main Street, Peapack-Gladstone, New Jersey
- Coordinates: 40°42′44″N 74°39′27″W
- Built: c. 1860
- Built by: Moses Craig
- NRHP reference No.: 100003610
- NJRHP No.: 5411

Significant dates
- Added to NRHP: April 11, 2019
- Designated NJRHP: October 29, 2018

The Moses Craig Lime Kilns, also known as the Peapack and Gladstone Lime Kilns, are located at 122 Main Street in the borough of Peapack-Gladstone in Somerset County, New Jersey, United States. Built c. 1860, the lime kilns, listed as the Moses Craig Limekilns, were added to the National Register of Historic Places on April 11, 2019. The Historical Society of the Somerset Hills acquired the site in 1998. The kilns were subsequently transferred to the borough in 2019.

== History ==
Moses Craig (1797–1874), a wealthy farmer, owned the lime kilns, which were built about 1860, and a local limestone quarry. The limestone was burnt in the kilns and used in agriculture as a soil additive and used in construction to make mortar and whitewash. The operation remained in business until about 1934, as pulverized lime replaced burnt limestone for agriculture. The two stone kilns are 26 feet (7.9 m) high. The site is now a small park with information signs about the lime kilns.

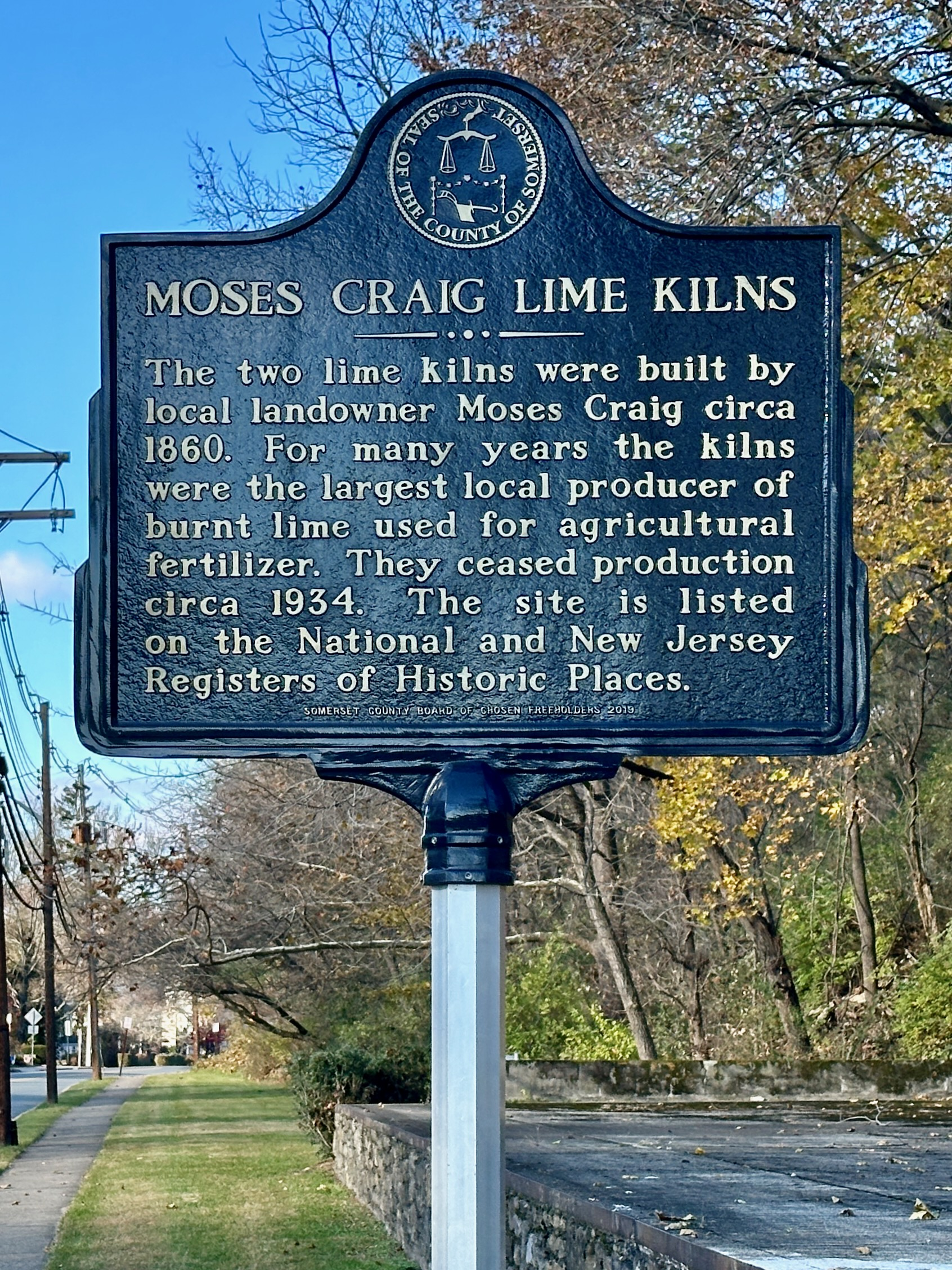
Information sign

== See also ==
- National Register of Historic Places listings in Somerset County, New Jersey
- List of lime kilns in the United States
