= Alvin Tresselt =

American children's book author

Alvin Tresselt (September 30, 1916, in Passaic, New Jersey – July 24, 2000) was a graphic designer and American children's book author. His picture book White Snow, Bright Snow (illustrated by Roger Duvoisin) received the Caldecott Medal. One of his most popular books was his retelling of the Ukrainian folktale The Mitten, illustrated by Yaroslava Mills.

Tresselt grew up in Passaic and graduated from Passaic High School in 1934. He was an editor for Humpty Dumpty Magazine and an executive editor for Parents Magazine Press before becoming an instructor and the Dean of Faculty for the Institute of Children's Literature in Connecticut. He wrote over thirty children's books, selling over a million copies. He died on July 24, 2000, at his home in Burlington, Vermont at the age of 83.

The many collaborations between Tresselt and the illustrator Roger Duvoisin were given the genre title "mood books" when a retrospective of Duvoisin's original art for Tresselt's texts was held at the Zimmerli Art Museum at Rutgers University in 2020. “Mood books were a new type of genre in children’s literature, unlike the typical fantasy and adventure tales,” said Nicole Simpson, the Zimmerli's assistant curator of Prints and Drawings, who organized the exhibition. “These books did not focus on the actions or personalities of iconic characters, but marveled in the natural wonders of our everyday environments. They encourage children to slow down, to observe and appreciate our constantly changing world.”

== Works ==
- Rain Drop Splash (1946) – illustrated by Leonard Weisgard, Caldecott Award, Honor
- Sun Up (1949)
- Bonnie Bess, the Weathervane Horse (1949), illus. by Erik Blegvad
- The Rabbit Story (1957), illus. by Carolyn Ewing
- The Smallest Elephant In the World (1959), illus. by Milton Glaser
- How Far is Far? (1964), illus. by Ward Brackett
- The Mitten (1964), illus. by Yaroslava
- The Old Man and the Tiger (1965), illus. by Albert Aquino
- A Thousand Lights and Fireflies (1965), illus. by John Moodie
- The World in the Candy Egg (1967)
- Under the Trees and Through the Grass (1967)
- The Legend of the Willow Plate (1968)
- The Fox Who Traveled (1968), illus. by Nancy Sears
- The Little Mouse Who Tarried (1971) by Hirosuke Hamada, English version by Alvin Tresselt, illus. by Kozo Kakimoto
- The Dead Tree (1972), illus. by Charles Robinson
- Sun Up (1991, retitled reprint of Wake up, Farm! [1955] with new illus. by Henri Sorensen)
- The Gift of the Tree (1992, retitled reprint of The Dead Tree [1972] with new illus. by Henri Sorensen)

=== Works illustrated by Roger Duvoisin ===
- White Snow, Bright Snow (1947) – Caldecott Award
- Johnny Maple-Leaf (1948)
- Follow the Wind (1950)
- Hi, Mister Robin! (1950)
- Autumn Harvest (1951)
- Follow the Road (1953)
- I Saw The Sea Come In (1954)
- Wake up, Farm! (1955)
- Wake up, City! (1957)
- The Frog in the Well (1958)
- Under the Trees and Through the Grass (1962)
- Hide and Seek Fog (1965) – Caldecott Award, Honor
- Timothy Robbins Climbs the Mountain (1967)
- It’s Time Now (1969)
- The Beaver Pond (1971)
- What Did You Leave Behind? (1978)
