= Peapack Private Bank & Trust =

Bank based in Bedminster, New Jersey, US

- Industry: Banking/Private Banking/Financial Services, Wealth Management
- Founded: 1921
- Founder: Ellis Tiger and Garner F. Hill
- Headquarters: Bedminster, NJ
- Website: www.peapackprivate.com

Peapack Private Bank & Trust, commonly known as Peapack Private (NASDAQ: PGC), is a publicly traded financial institution with an investment-grade credit rating. The company holds a Baa3 issuer rating from Moody’s Investors Service and a BBB+ deposit rating from Kroll Bond Rating Agency (KBRA).

== History ==
Peapack Private was established in 1921 by Ellis Tiger and Garner F. Hill as Peapack-Gladstone National Bank (PGNB). The bank initially served the local community, providing essential banking services in an era when banking was conducted with passbooks and ledger cards, well before the widespread use of debit and credit cards, ATMs, or mobile banking.

In recent years, the bank unified its banking and wealth management services under the name Peapack Private Bank & Trust. The bank expanded in the New York metropolitan area, operating a financial center in New York City (300 Park Avenue) and commercial offices in New York City; Garden City, Melville, and Rye Brook, New York; and Lakewood, Princeton, Red Bank, Summit, and Teaneck, New Jersey, alongside multiple Financial Centers throughout New Jersey.

== Leadership ==
=== Douglas L. Kennedy — President and Chief Executive Officer ===
Douglas L. Kennedy has served as president and chief executive officer of Peapack-Gladstone Financial Corporation and Peapack Private Bank & Trust since October 9, 2012. Before joining the bank, Kennedy served as President of the New Jersey Market for Capital One Bank and held executive positions at Fleet Bank, North Fork Bank, Summit Bancorp, and Bank of America. He holds a BS in Economics and an MBA in Finance from Sacred Heart University.

In December 2019, Kennedy was appointed to the board of directors of the Federal Reserve Bank of New York as a Class A Director, elected by peer member banks for a three-year term ending December 31, 2022, as announced by the Federal Reserve Bank of New York and reported by NJBIZ.

=== John P. Babcock — Senior Executive Vice President, President of Wealth Management ===
John P. Babcock joined Peapack-Gladstone Bank in March 2014 as Senior Executive Vice President and President of Wealth Management. He previously served as Managing Director and Regional Head of the Northeast and Mid-Atlantic region for HSBC Private Bank, and as Managing Director and Regional CEO at U.S. Trust/Bank of America. He holds a BS from Tulane University and an MBA from Fairleigh Dickinson University.

Under Babcock's leadership, the bank completed six wealth management firm acquisitions between 2014 and 2021, as reported by ^{[19]}American Banker. In a 2024 interview with American Banker, Babcock described the bank's strategy of hiring bankers from the failed Signature Bank and First Republic Bank to build out the New York wealth management presence, stating: "We felt with the demise of Signature and First Republic...there was a spot for a boutique private bank."

=== Andrew F. Corrado — Executive Vice President, President of New York ===
Andrew F. Corrado joined Peapack Private in April 2024 as Executive Vice President and President of the bank's New York operations, along with more than ten commercial banking teams. Corrado previously served as Executive Vice President and Head of Commercial and Private Banking for the Northeast at Flagstar Bank (formerly Signature Bank), and in multiple senior roles at Capital One Bank, including Market President for the Long Island region.

His appointment was reported by Banking Dive, which described it as part of a broader wave of hiring from NYCB's Flagstar subsidiary following the 2023 regional banking disruptions.

=== Maureen E. Hemhauser ===
As the Chief Risk Officer and Head of Compliance, Maureen Hemhauser leads the bank's enterprise risk management and regulatory compliance programs

== Notable Historical Figures ==
=== Garner F. Hill and T. Leonard Hill ===
Garner F. Hill was the co-founder of Peapack-Gladstone Bank in 1921 and its longest-serving director. He operated a general store and several businesses in Gladstone, New Jersey. His son, T. Leonard Hill, later served as a Bank Director and Chairman Emeritus of Peapack-Gladstone Financial Corp. According to a 2011 Patch.com article, the bank's Bridgewater branch mural labels the depicted market "Hills Market" in tribute to the founding Hill family. T. Leonard Hill's daughter, Pam Hill, subsequently served on the bank's board of directors.

=== Frank A. Kissel ===
Frank A. Kissel served as chairman and chief executive officer of Peapack-Gladstone Financial Corporation prior to Douglas Kennedy's appointment in 2012. He announced Kennedy's appointment via PR Newswire on October 4, 2012, and subsequently became Chairman Emeritus, as listed in the company's 2024 Annual Report.
