= Imperial Woman =

1956 novel by Pearl S. Buck

- First edition
- Author: Pearl S. Buck
- Language: English
- Genre: Historical novel
- Publisher: John Day
- Publication date: April 2, 1956
- Publication place: United States
- Media type: Print (hardback & paperback)

Imperial Woman is a novel by Pearl S. Buck first published in 1956.

Imperial Woman is a fictionalized biography of Empress Dowager Cixi (Tzu Hsi in Wade–Giles), who was a concubine of the Xianfeng Emperor and on his death became the de facto head of the Qing dynasty until her death in 1908 (before which the novel ends).

== Plot Overview ==
Tzu Hsi is the story of the last Empress in China, born into one of the lowly ranks of the Imperial dynasty. According to custom, she moved to the Forbidden City at the age of seventeen to become one of hundreds of concubines. But her singular beauty and powers of manipulation quickly moved her into the position of Second Consort. Tzu Hsi is feared and hated by many in the court, but adored by the people. The Empress's rise to power (even during her husband's life) parallels the story of China's transition from the ancient to the modern way.
