= Anna Langfus =

Polish-French writer (1920–1966)

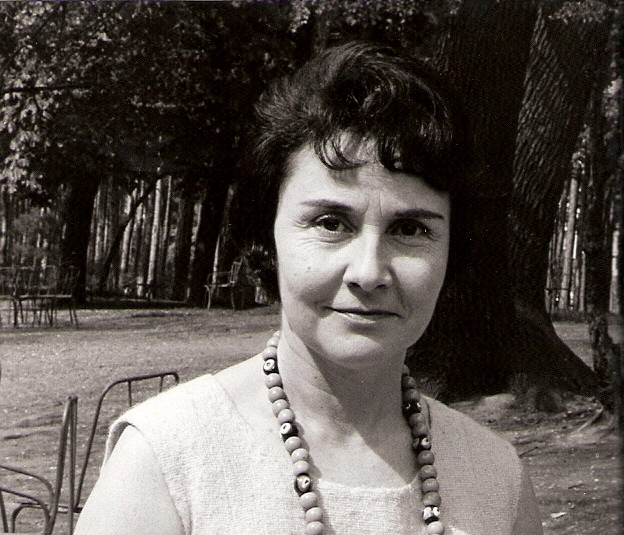
- Born: Anna-Regina Szternfinkiel; 2 January 1920; Lublin, Poland
- Died: 12 May 1966 (aged 46); Paris, France
- Occupation: Novelist
- Spouse(s): Jakub Rajs; Aron Langfus
- Children: 1
- Writing career
- Language: French
- Genre: Fiction
- Subject: Holocaust
- Notable work: Les bagages de sable
- Notable awards: Prix Goncourt

Anna Langfus (born Anna-Regina Szternfinkiel; 2 January 1920 – 12 May 1966) was a Polish-French author. She was also a Holocaust survivor. She won the Prix Goncourt for Les bagages de sable (translated as "Bags of Sand"), about a concentration camp survivor.

== Early life and career ==
Born Anna-Regina Szternfinkiel in Lublin on 2 January 1920, she was the only child of Polish-Jewish parents. When she turned 17, she married Jakub Rajs, and they traveled to Belgium in 1938 to attend the Ecole Polytechnique de Verviers. They intended to become textile engineers so that they could manage her parents' factory. In 1939, they traveled back to Poland for a vacation, but soon it was occupied. The couple and their parents were forcibly sent to the Lublin Ghetto and then the Warsaw Ghetto. She escaped the Warsaw Ghetto with her husband, and they survived by using false identities, later joining the Polish Resistance. They were arrested and tortured by the Gestapo, who killed Jakub Rajs by gunshot. She was sent to multiple prisons and labor camps, while her parents were murdered in a Nazi extermination camp. She was held at a political prison in Schröttersburg (Płock) until the country was liberated in March 1945.

From 1946 to 1947, after moving to France, she was a mathematics teacher at a Jewish orphanage near Paris. After marrying Aron Langfus in January 1948, who graduated from the Polytechnic Institute in Prague as an engineer, the two of them had a daughter, Maria, in 1948.

== Literary career and death ==
Langfus took a course that influenced her to write plays for the theatre. She began to write in French during the 1950s, and her first play Les Lepreux (The Lepers), which was written in 1952 and performed in 1956, is unpublished.

Langfus' novels are about the "war, destruction, and loss after the Holocaust" with her own life experiences interwoven into the fiction. Her 1960 novel Le Sel et le Soufre (Salt and Suffering) is about the war in Poland, the Lublin Ghetto being destroyed, and the main character's family being murdered. The novel's main character is Maria, a young woman who escapes with her husband. Maria's husband was murdered, and she later endures imprisonment and torture. The 1962 novel Les bagages de sable (Bags of Sand), a sequel to the 1960 novel, also has Maria as the main character. This novel won the Prix Goncourt in 1962. In the novel, Maria travels from Paris to Poland so that she can "resurface", but she deals with much despair due to thoughts of her dead relatives. Langfus' third and final novel, Saute, Barbara (Jump, Barbara), was published in 1965 and follows a Polish man who escapes from Germany with an abducted girl that he names Barbara. Langfus used a male narrator in Saute, Barbara as an attempt to distance the novel from her personal life.

Langfus died on 12 May 1966 from a stroke at the age of 46, while she was in the process of writing another novel. She died in Sarcelles, a suburb of Paris.
