= The Cat Who Thought He Was a Tiger =

1956 picture book by Polly Cameron

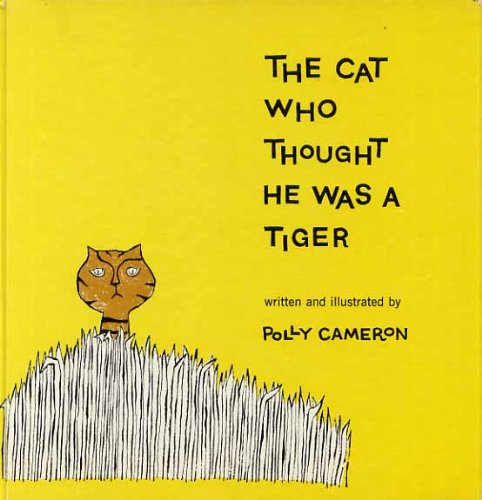
- Cover Illustration
- Author: Polly Cameron
- Illustrator: Polly Cameron
- Language: English
- Genre: Children's picture book
- Published: 1956 (Coward-McCann)
- Publication place: USA
- Media type: Print (hardback)
- Pages: 36
- OCLC: 1394112

The Cat Who Thought He Was a Tiger is a 1956 children's picture book by Polly Cameron. It was originally published by Coward-McCann.

== Plot ==
A striped cat believes he is a tiger. While his four brothers and sisters live, play, and eat together with a boy and girl in a house, he does things that he thinks tigers do like living alone in the backyard, eating grass, and sleeping in a tree. Later, he goes to a circus, meets a tiger and asks to play with it as "You're a tiger and I'm a tiger". The tiger sets him straight by saying "You? a TIGER? No You're not, .. You're a little cat." On hearing this, the cat is very happy and runs back to the house where he tells everyone that he is a cat and now the cat plays, eats, and sleeps with his brothers and sisters.

== Reception ==
Idaho State Journal called it a "delightful fantasy" and in a star review, Kirkus Reviews wrote "Tiger colored pictures, posed with dead pan drama, add a note of gentle ferocity." The Saturday Review called it "a delightful story" and wrote "The stylized illustrations add charm and interest to the tale." Duncan Weller counts it amongst his favorite picture books.
