= The Little Man from Archangel =

1956 novel by Georges Simenon

- Author: Georges Simenon
- Original title: Le Petit Homme d'Arkhangelsk
- Language: English, French
- Genre: Crime fiction
- Publisher: Presses de la Cité
- Publication date: 1956
- Publication place: Belgium
- English publication date: 1957
- Media type: Print (hardback & paperback)
- Pages: 159 pp (in 1957 Hamish Hamilton edition)
- Preceded by: The Rules of the Game
- Followed by: Maigret Has Scruples

The Little Man from Archangel (original title Le Petit Homme d'Arkhangelsk), first published in English by Hamish Hamilton in 1957, is a novel by Georges Simenon.

It tells the story of Jonas Milk, a man whose Russian-Jewish parents, refugees from Arkhangelsk, brought him up in a little French town where he owns a bookshop. One day his promiscuous wife disappears, not for the first time, but this time she has taken his valuable stamp collection. As she fails to reappear, and first his neighbours and then the police become suspicious, his grip on his own life weakens.

== Plot summary ==
Left in an unnamed town in Berry by his Jewish parents, who returned to Soviet Russia and oblivion, the timid Jonas Milk lives quietly above his second-hand bookshop and also deals in rare stamps. He feels at home amongst the other small businesses in the town, until he marries his maid, a much younger woman with a bad reputation and converts to Catholicism. She is neither a good housekeeper nor a faithful wife, and causes Milk considerable embarrassment and shame. Though she disappears with other men from time to time, she always returns soon after to Milk.

However, one day when she has not come home and Milk, to spare himself yet more embarrassment, lies over her whereabouts. As the days pass, his lies are believed by fewer and fewer neighbours, who begin to shun him, and somebody informs the police. His anguish is increased by the fact that his most valuable stamps, which only she knew about, are gone from his safe.

The police first call round for an allegedly informal chat and then call him in to the station for a formal interrogation, followed by an exhaustive search of his premises. They are suspicious because he has not reported a missing person and, like the rest of the town, wonder if her body is in the canal as an end to her overt infidelities.

Milk's worries are initially eased when a hotel chambermaid tells him that his wife has gone off with a salesman whose room she shared whenever he visited the town. Innocent all along of any crime, he first thinks of going round to the police station but, no longer able to face the hostility of the community and the pressure of the police, instead hangs himself.

== Adaptations ==
The story was adapted for the BBC radio drama series BBC Radio 4 - Afternoon Drama, first broadcast on 3 August 2011, starring Steven McNicoll and Francesca Dymond.
