= Louise Fatio =

American writer

Louise Emma Fatio Duvoisin (August 18, 1904 – July 26, 1993) was a Swiss-born American writer of children's books. Many were created in collaboration with her husband Roger Duvoisin, a Swiss-born illustrator, and she is known best for their picture book series Happy Lion. The Happy Lion (1954), first in the series, won the inaugural, 1956 Deutscher Jugendliteraturpreis in its German-language translation (Der glückliche Löwe).

== Background ==
Fatio was born August 18, 1904, in Lausanne, Switzerland, and educated in Geneva. She emigrated to the United States in 1925 and became a naturalized citizen in 1938.

Fatio's earliest work in the U.S. Library of Congress catalog is The Christmas forest, a 48-page book illustrated by Duvoisin, with a 1950 copyright date. It was published by Aladdin Paperbacks no earlier than 1967, perhaps earlier in hardcover. Her first book published was The Happy Lion in 1954.

A resident of Peapack-Gladstone, New Jersey and then Chester Township, New Jersey, Fatio died on July 26, 1993, at the age of 88 at a nursing home in Somerset, New Jersey.
