= Thomas Kiernan (biographer) =

American writer who specialized in biography (1933–2003)

- Born: January 13, 1933; Jersey City, New Jersey, U.S.
- Died: December 22, 2003 (aged 70); Peapack-Gladstone, New Jersey, U.S.
- Occupation: Author

Thomas Kiernan (January 13, 1933 – December 22, 2003) was an American writer who specialized in biography.

Kiernan was the author of a vast assortment of biographies that featured celebrities, literary luminaries, scientists, sports stars, psychologists, and political figures and their associates. He wrote biographies of Laurence Olivier, Jane Fonda, John Steinbeck, and Yasser Arafat.

== Biography ==
Born in Jersey City, New Jersey, he was raised in Orange and attended Newark Academy. Kiernan earned his Bachelor of Arts degree in 1956 from the University of Notre Dame in South Bend, Indiana.

After serving in the United States Army from 1956 to 1958, Kiernan pursued graduate studies in philosophy.

During the 1970s and 1980s, Kiernan published biographies of Jane Fonda, John Steinbeck, Yasser Arafat, Roman Polanski, and Laurence Olivier.

Kiernan was a personal acquaintance and occasional tennis partner of Rupert Murdoch, about whom he wrote Citizen Murdoch (1986).

== Awards ==
In 1976, Kiernan's book The Arabs received the Anisfield-Wolf Book Award for nonfiction. In researching this book, he traveled extensively throughout the Middle East to interview scores of prominent Arab spokesmen, including Yasir Arafat.

== Break in ==
According to an article in The New York Times dated November 27, 1975, a completed manuscript of a biography on Bebe Rebozo, an associate of Richard Nixon's, that was scheduled to be published by Farrar, Straus & Giroux was stolen from the home of Thomas Kiernan. In addition to Rebozo's biography "several tape recordings of interviews and several research files, including one file containing all of Mr. Kiernan's book contracts and another containing all his royalty statements, were taken." Other news coverage at the time pointed out that "thieves ignored" jewelry and other items of value.

== Death ==
He died at his home in Peapack-Gladstone, New Jersey on December 22, 2003.

== Bibliography ==
=== Biographies ===
- Shrinks, etc.: a consumer's guide to psychotherapies (1974)
- The Arabs : their history, aims, and challenge to the industrialized world (1975)
- Arafat, the man and the myth (1976)
- The intricate music : a biography of John Steinbeck (1979)
- The Roman Polanski Story (1980)
- Sir Larry : the life of Laurence Olivier (1981)
- Jane Fonda: Heroine for our Time (1982)
- Citizen Murdoch (1986)
