= Roger Duvoisin =

American writer

Roger Antoine Duvoisin
- Born: August 28, 1900; Geneva, Switzerland
- Died: June 30, 1980 (aged 79)
- Occupations: Writer and illustrator
- Known for: Children's picture books
- Spouse: Louise Fatio

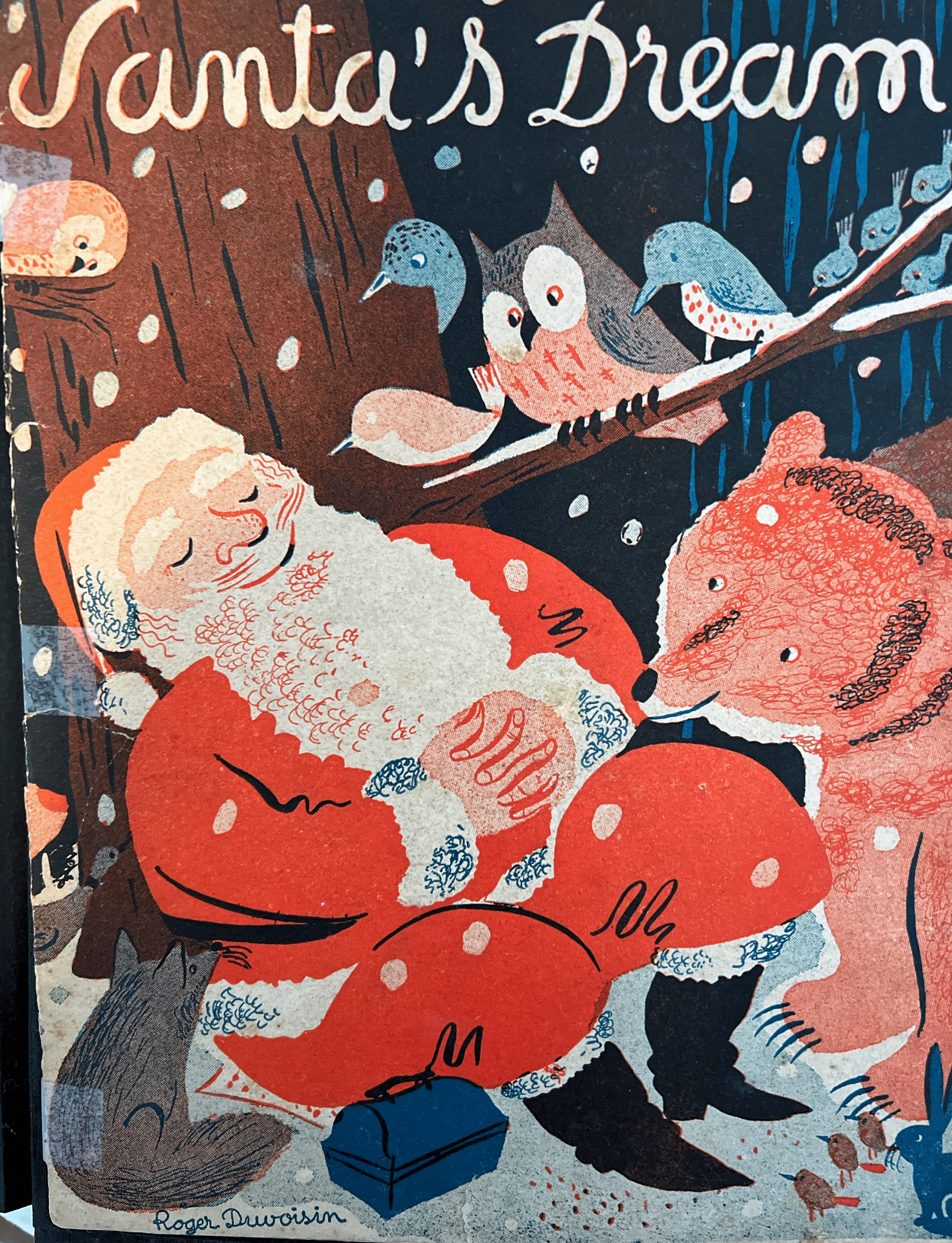

Roger Antoine Duvoisin (August 28, 1900 – June 30, 1980) was a Swiss-born American writer and illustrator best known for children's picture books. He won the 1948 Caldecott Medal for picture books, and in 1968, Duvoisin was a highly commended runner-up for the biennial, international Hans Christian Andersen Award for children's illustrators.

== Life ==
Duvoisin was born in Geneva, Switzerland, in 1900. He learned to draw early having been encouraged by his father, who was an architect, and his godmother, a well-known painter of enamels. Duvoisin studied at the École Nationale Supérieure des Arts Décoratifs in Paris. His first job was designing scenery, making posters, and painting murals. Duvoisin also became a manager of an old French pottery plant before becoming involved with textile design, an occupation that eventually brought him to the United States. Duvoisin married Louise Fatio, another artist from Switzerland. In 1927, they moved to New York City where he worked on children's books and magazine illustrations. Duvoisin became an American citizen in 1938.

Duvoisin died in June 1980. He sometimes gave 1904 as his year of birth, but Duvoisin was nearly 80 at his death, born in 1900—the US Library of Congress learned from a publisher, indirectly from his widow. Jeanne Blackmore, Duvoisin's granddaughter, is also an author with her first children's book, How Does Sleep Come? published in 2012.

== Books and awards ==
Duvoisin wrote his first book in the United States.

Duvoisin won the Caldecott Medal for White Snow, Bright Snow, written by Alvin Tresselt (D. Lothrop Co., 1947). The annual American Library Association award recognizes the illustrator of the year's "most distinguished American picture book for children". Their 1965 collaboration Hide and Seek Fog was one of three Caldecott runners-up.

Fatio wrote and Duvoisin illustrated The Happy Lion, a picture book published by McGraw-Hill in 1954. It was her first book and the first of ten Happy Lion books they created together (1954–1980). Its German-language edition (Der glückliche Löwe) won the inaugural 1956 Deutscher Jugendliteraturpreis. (Note: Published by Herder in 1955, Der glückliche Löwe is the earliest-dated of about 200 records for Duvoisin in the German National Library.)

Duvoisin both wrote and illustrated a successful series featuring Petunia the goose and Veronica the hippopotamus, inaugurated by Petunia (Alfred A. Knopf, 1950) and Veronica (Knopf, 1961; The Bodley Head, 1961). Duvoisin's works also include translation and illustration of medieval European folk tales such as The Crocodile in the Tree (1973).

In 1961, Duvoisin received an award from the Society of Illustrators. Five years later, he received the Rugers Bi-Centennial award.

Duvoisin's books were published by The Bodley Head Ltd in London, Sydney and Toronto.

== Books ==
=== As writer and illustrator ===
- A Little Boy Was Drawing (1932)
- Donkey–donkey (1934)
- All Aboard! (1935)
- And There Was America (1938)
- The Three Sneezes and Other Swiss Tales (1941); published in the UK as Fairy Tales from Switzerland (1941)
- The Christmas Cake In Search of Its Owner (1941)
- They Put Out to Sea: The Story of the Map (1944)
- The Christmas Whale (1945)
- The Christmas Voyage (1947)
- Chanticleer (1947)
- The Petunia series (1950–75)
  - Petunia (1950)
  - Petunia and the Song (1951)
  - Petunia's Christmas (1952)
  - Petunia Takes a Trip (1953)
  - Petunia, Beware! (1958)
  - Petunia, I Love You (1965)
  - Petunia's Treasure (1975)
- A for the Ark (1952)
- Easter Treat (1954)
- Two Lonely Ducks (1955)
- One Thousand Christmas Beards (1955)
- The House of Four Seasons (1956)
- Day and Night (1960)
- The Happy Hunter (1961)
- The Veronica series (1961–71)
  - Veronica (1961)
  - Our Veronica Goes to Petunia's Farm (1962)
  - Veronica's Smile (1964)
  - Lonely Veronica (1964)
  - Veronica and the Birthday Present (1971)
- The Miller, His Son, and Their Donkey, a retelling of the fable (1962)
- Spring Snow (1963)
- The Missing Milkman (1967)
- What Is Right for Tulip (1969)
- The Crocodile in the Tree (1972)
- Jasmine (1973)
- See What I Am (1974)
- Periwinkle (1976)
- Crocus (1977)
- Snowy and Woody (1979)
- The Importance of Crocus (1981)

=== As illustrator ===
With Alvin Tresselt:

- White Snow, Bright Snow (1947) – Caldecott Award
- Johnny Maple-Leaf (1948)
- Follow the Wind (1950)
- Autumn Harvest (1951)
- Follow the Road (1953)
- Wake up, Farm! (1955)
- Wake up, City! (1957)
- The Frog in the Well (1958)
- Under the Trees and Through the Grass (1962)
- Hi, Mister Robin! (1963, new edition from 1950 version)
- Hide and Seek Fog (1965) – Caldecott Award, Honor
- Timothy Robbins Climbs the Mountain (1967)
- It’s Time Now (1969)
- The Beaver Pond (1971)
- What Did You Leave Behind? (1978)

With Louise Fatio:

- The Happy Lion (1954)
- The Happy Lion in Africa (1955)
- The Happy Lion Roars (1957)
- The Three Happy Lions (1959)
- The Happy Lion's Quest (1961)
- The Happy Lion and the Bear (1964)
- The Happy Lion's Holiday, aka The Happy Lion's Vacation (1967)
- The Happy Lion's Treasure (1970)
- The Happy Lion's Rabbits (1974)
- The Happy Lioness (1980)

Others:

- Mother Goose: A Comprehensive Collection of Rhymes by William Rose Benét (1936)
- The Happy Time by Robert Louis Fontaine (1945)
- The Camel Who Took a Walk by Jack Tworkov (1951)
- The Talking Cat and Other Tales of French Canada by Natalie Savage Carlson (1952)
- The Night Before Christmas by Clement Clarke Moore (1954)
- Wobble, the Witch Cat by Mary Calhoun (1958)
- Houn' Dog by Mary Calhoun (1959)
- The Hungry Leprechaun by Mary Calhoun (1962)
- The Poodle Who Barked at the Wind by Charlotte Zolotow (1964)
- The Rain Puddle by Adelaide Holl (1965)
- The Old Bullfrog by Berniece Freschet (1968)
- Earth and Sky by Mona Dayton (1969)
- Santa's Dream (unknown date), advertising piece for Peck's Toy Village; included a story and games for children
