= My Friend Joe =

- Directed by: Chris Bould
- Written by: David Howard
- Produced by: Steve Matthews (co-producer); Gerhard Schmidt (executive producer); Sytze Van Der Laan (producer)
- Starring: Schuyler Fisk; John Cleere; Stephen McHattie
- Cinematography: Michael Faust
- Edited by: Rodney Holland
- Music by: Ronan Hardiman
- Release date: 29 August 1996 (Germany)
- Running time: 101 or 102 minutes
- Countries: United Kingdom; Germany; Ireland
- Language: English

My Friend Joe is a 1996 film directed by Chris Bould starring Schuyler Fisk and John Cleere. The film is based on the 1985 Swedish novel Janne, min vän (Johnny, My Friend) by Peter Pohl.

== Plot summary ==
Chris' new best friend, the American Joe, turns out not to be a boy, but a girl.

== Cast ==
- Schuyler Fisk as Joe
- John Cleere as Chris Doyle
- Stephen McHattie as Curt
- Stanley Townsend as Mr. Doyle
- Pauline McLynn as Ms. Doyle
- Eoin Hughes as Boyler
- Mark Hannigan as Conor
- Stuart Dannell-Foran as Noel
- Joel Grey as Simon
- Katie Carroll as Suzie
- Katy Davis as Aideen
- Didier Pasquette as Nicolai

== Awards and honors ==
- 16th Ale Kino! International Young Audience Film Festival, 1998
  - Chris Bould won "Silver Poznan Goat" for "Best Live-Action Film"
  - The film won "Marcin - Children's Jury Award" for "Best Live-Action Film"
  - Schuyler Fisk won "Poznań Goats" for Best Foreign Child Actor or Actress
- Berlin International Film Festival, 1996
  - Chris Bould won "Award of the Senator for Women, Youth and Family"
- Carrousel International du Film, 1996
  - Chris Bould won "Audience Camério"
- German Children's-Film & TV-Festival, 1997
  - The film won "Children Jury Golden Sparrow" for "Best Feature - Long"
- Chicago International Children's Film Festival, 1998
  - Chris Bould won 2nd prize "Children's Jury Award" for "Feature Film and Video"
