= I Miss You =

I Miss You may refer to:

== Film and television ==
- I Miss You (1992 film), a Thai film
- I Miss You (2011 film), a Swedish film
- I Miss You (2019 film), a Bolivian film
- I Miss You (TV series), or Missing You, a 2012–2013 melodrama

== Music ==
=== Albums ===
- I Miss You (album), by Harold Melvin & The Blue Notes, or the title song, 1972
- I Miss You (EP), by Girl's Day, or the title song, 2014

=== Songs ===
- "I Miss You" (Aaron Hall song), 1994
- "I Miss You" (Badfinger song), 1974
- "I Miss You" (Basshunter song), 2008; originally recorded by Westlife as "Miss You", 1999
- "I Miss You" (Beverley Craven song), 1999
- "I Miss You" (Beyoncé song), 2011
- "I Miss You" (Björk song), 1995
- "I Miss You" (Blink-182 song), 2004
- "I Miss You" (Boyfriend song), 2017
- "I Miss You" (Clean Bandit song), 2017
- "I Miss You" (Darren Hayes song), 2002
- "I Miss You" (DMX song), 2001
- "I Miss You" (Haddaway song), 1993
- "I Miss You" (Jeannie Seely song), 1974
- "I Miss You" (Klymaxx song), 1985
- "I Miss You" (Miley Cyrus song), 2007
- "I Miss You" (N II U song), 1994
- "I Miss You" (Sarah Engels song), 2011
- "I Miss You" (Webbie song), 2008
- "I Miss You (Toki o Koete)", by Misia, 2001
- "I Miss You" / "The Future", by Cute, 2014
- "I Miss U", by Jax Jones and Au/Ra, 2020
- "I Miss You", by 5 Seconds of Summer from Unplugged, 2012
- "I Miss You", by Adele from 25, 2015
- "I Miss You", by Grey, 2017
- "I Miss You", by Incubus from Make Yourself, 1999
- "I Miss You", by Jason Chan, 2008
- "I Miss You", by Kacey Musgraves from Same Trailer Different Park, 2013
- "I Miss You", by Kylie Minogue from Kylie, 1988
- "I Miss You", by Mamamoo from Melting, 2016
- "I Miss You", by Randy Newman from Bad Love, 1999
- "I Miss You", by Elvis Presley from Raised on Rock / For Ol' Times Sake, 1973
- "I Miss You", by Thundamentals, 2018
- "I Miss You", by Yohanna from Butterflies and Elvis, 2009

== See also ==
- "Honey (I Miss You)", a 1968 song by Bobby Goldsboro
- I Miss You, I Miss You!, a 1992 novel by Peter Pohl and Kinna Gieth
- "Stay (I Missed You)", a 1994 song by Lisa Loeb
- Miss (disambiguation)
- Miss You (disambiguation)
- "Missing" (Everything but the Girl song)
- Missing You (disambiguation)
