= Agnes Cecilia – en sällsam historia =

1991 film

- Directed by: Anders Grönros
- Written by: Maria Gripe; Margareta Simonsson-Sarnecki; Anders Grönros
- Produced by: Waldemar Bergendahl; Ingrid Dalunde
- Starring: Gloria Tapia; Ronn Elfors
- Cinematography: Per Källberg
- Release date: 29 August 1991
- Running time: 128 minutes
- Country: Sweden
- Language: Swedish

Agnes Cecilia – en sällsam historia is a 1991 Swedish mystery film directed by Anders Grönros, based on Maria Gripe's young adult novel of the same name. Grönros won the award for Best Director and Per Källberg won the award for Best Cinematography at the 27th Guldbagge Awards. It was also nominated for Best Film and Gloria Tapia was nominated for Best Actress in a leading role.

== Plot ==
As a five-year-old, Nora loses her parents in a car accident. Her relatives never tell her the truth of what happened. Ten years later, Nora moves with her foster family into an old apartment building, where strange things begin to happen. She hears footsteps stopping outside her room, she barely escapes a fatal accident thanks to an anonymous phone call, and a book of Russian folk tales repeatedly falls open to the page reading "Go I Know Not Whither and Fetch I Know Not What". Together with her foster brother Dag, Nora searches for answers to all the questions surrounding her.

== Production ==
Filming took place in Nyköping, Gamla Stan, and Stockholm Central Station between 9 October 1989 and May 1990.

== Cast ==
- Gloria Tapia – Eleonora "Nora" Hed
- Ronn Elfors – Dag Sjöborg
- Stina Ekblad – Karin Sjöborg
- Allan Svensson – Anders Sjöborg
- Vanna Rosenberg – Lena, Nora's friendess
- Cecilia Milocco – Agnes Cecilia Eng / Tetti
- Mimi Pollak – Hulda Persson, Inga's mother
- Meta Velander – Vera Alm, Nora's mat. grandmother
- Percy Brandt – Birger Alm, Nora's mat. grandfather
- Natasha Chiapponi-Grönros – Nora as a child
- Benjamin Elfors – Dag as a child
- Bojan Westin – Inga, Lena's mat. grandmother
- Suzanne Reuter – Carita Eng, Tetti's mother
- Beatrice Chiapponi-Grönros – Anna Hed, Nora's mother
- Björn Andrésen – Per Hed, Nora's father
- Olle Johansson – Clockmaker
- Måns Westfelt – Doll-doctor
- Fredrik Grundel – Teacher
- Anne Otto – Nurse
- Clemens Paal – Construction-worker
