= Kinna Gieth =

Swedish writer (born 1976)

Anna Katarina "Kinna" Gieth Castellano (née Gieth; born 21 June 1976) is a Swedish writer. She was awarded the August Prize for children's and young adult literature in 1992 for her book I Miss You, I Miss You! (Jag saknar dig, jag saknar dig!), jointly with her co-author Peter Pohl. Aged only sixteen at the time, she is the youngest ever recipient of the August Prize, one of Sweden's most prestigious literary prizes. The book is a novel for young adults. It is semi-autobiographical and inspired by her life following the death of her twin sister Jenny in a traffic accident at the age of thirteen. In the autumn of 1990 Gieth, then aged fourteen, wrote to her favourite author, the established writer Peter Pohl, wondering if he could help her writing a book about her grief and life following the death of her sister. The book has been translated into German, Danish, Norwegian, Dutch, Finnish, Icelandic, English, and Slovene. After the German translation was published, she also received the Deutscher Jugendliteraturpreis in 1995. In 2011 her book was adapted into a motion picture, Jag saknar dig (I Miss You), directed by Anders Grönros.

== Works ==
- I Miss You, I Miss You! (Jag saknar dig, jag saknar dig!), 1992 (English translation 1999)
  - adapted into the film I Miss You (Jag saknar dig), 2011

== Awards ==
- August Prize, 1992
- Deutscher Jugendliteraturpreis, 1995
