= Cross-dressing in literature =

Cross-dressing as a literary motif is well attested in older literature but is becoming increasingly popular in modern literature as well. It is often associated with character nonconformity and sexuality rather than gender identity. Some may also relook at older literature as early representations of transgender and non-binary identities.

== Analysis and function of the motif ==
Female characters who cross-dress as men are also frequently portrayed as having done so to attain a higher social or economic position, a phenomenon known as the social progress narrative. Hijjas (2011) suggests that this motif also functions to subvert traditional values associated to specific genders, such as male possessing moral intellect and rationality, while female is subjected to their desires. Additionally, Chen (2024) observes that these heroines typically disguise themselves as men after suffering from setbacks and dilemmas. Furthermore, the success of a cross-dressed heroine often creates a paradox against innate male superiority, where feminine virtues such as mercy and intuition are shown to be superior when applied in masculine roles in governance and war. There is also a notion of Body-Mind dualism, where the soul and intellect has no gender, a theme famously explored in Virginia Woolf's Orlando.

Assuming a male identity allows them to travel safely, pursue jobs traditionally only reserved for men, and experience heterosexual romance by breaking away from the all-female social world of the private sphere during the nineteenth and early twentieth centuries. Literary analysis often distinguishes between those who cross-dress out of survival and those who does for freedom. A successful cross-dresser frequently requires a specific rhetoric or code-switch speech pattern to match their disguised gender. These characters are generally described as heroic, courageous, and virtuous. The cross-dressed heroine often gains a male gaze inversion, becoming the observer rather than the observed, allowing her to witness the "true" nature of men when they believe no women are present. Craft-Fairchild (1998) argues that the motif of female-to-male cross-dressing symbolizes women's discontent with their relegation to the domestic sphere of society. However, the discovery of the characters' assigned sex is often met with disapproval, indicating the endurance of traditional expectations of femininity. The reveal of their disguise function as a climax before it restores the female character's true gender.

Male-to-female cross-dressing is much less common in literature, and it is often used for comedic value or as a form of punishment for a male character. When it does appear, characters are often negatively feminized or portrayed as villains, in contrast to the heroism among female-to-male cross-dressers. The most well known example of this concept is the wolf from Little Red Riding Hood. Male-to-female cross-dressing is also almost always more closely linked to a character's sexuality and that of their partners than in female-to-male cross-dressing. However, in some literary traditions such as the Japanese Onnagata prose like The Great Mirror of Male Love the cross-dressed male is portrayed as an idealized form of femininity that transcends the capabilities of biological female woman.

The following is a non-exhaustive list of literary works that address the motif of cross-dressing:

== Ancient and medieval literature ==
- Achilles on Skyros (Achilleid, 1st century)
- Torikaebaya Monogatari (ca. 1100)
- Roman de Silence (13th century)
- Hagiography of Marina the Monk, portray cross-dressing as a tool for asceticism, where a woman becomes male to achieve higher holiness.
- Old Norse Sagas, including the Hervarar sagas which feature women who adopt male names and clothing to reclaim ancestral honor and heirlooms.
- Þrymskviða from the Poetic Edda - Thor dresses as a bride and Loki as the bridesmaid to retrieve Thor's hammer Mjölnir.

In the myth of the Trojan War, Achilles' mother Thetis wanted to keep him from joining the Greek forces (and thus dying in battle as was prophesied), so she dresses him in women's clothes and hides him among a cloister of women. When the Greek envoy arrives to fetch him for battle, Odysseus is suspicious of Achilles' absence and concocts a scheme to reveal the deception: he offers gifts to all the women, including among them a sword and shield. Then he has an alarm sounded, and when Achilles instinctively grabs the weapons to defend himself, the ruse is revealed and he must join the Greek army and fight at Troy.

In Ludovico Ariosto's Orlando Furioso, Bradamante, being a knight, wears full-plate armor; similarly, Britomart wears full-plate armor in Edmund Spenser's The Faerie Queene. Intentionally or not, this disguises them as men, and they are taken as such by other characters. In Orlando Furioso, Fiordespina falls in love with Bradamante; her brother Ricciardetto disguises himself as his sister, dressing as a woman, persuades Fiordespina that he is Bradamante, magically changed into a man to make their love possible, and in his female attire is able to conduct a love affair with her. This suggests that the skill of knight is gender-neutral rather than categorized by sex.

== Early modern literature ==
Female-to-male disguises were a frequent subject of early-modern theater and literature; these scenarios were typically comedic in nature, but could also embody dramatic implications. The existence of cross-dressing in Renaissance and early-modern literature additionally served to complicate the sexual dynamics presented throughout the work, most notably seen in tragicomic plays. The humor in these scenarios was enhanced by the fact that boy players commonly depicted women in English theater, adding to the comedic aspect of cross-dressing.

As an early modern playwright, William Shakespeare included cross-dressing in several of his plays. He most frequently depicted cross-dressing female characters who took on masculine clothing to carry out actions difficult for women. Relevant examples include:

- In The Merchant of Venice (c. 1596-1598), Portia and her maid dress as men to plead in court on the merchant's behalf, and are quite successful in their ruse; in the same play, Shylock's daughter Jessica dresses as a man to elope with her Christian lover.
- When Rosalind and Celia flee court in As You Like It (c. 1599), Rosalind dons a male persona named Ganymede for her and Celia's safety. The situation is complicated to comic levels when Orlando, a man madly in love with Rosalind, finds Ganymede in the forest. Ganymede then pretends to be a woman to aid Orlando in gaining practice for wooing Rosalind; in the midst of this fervor, a shepherdess named Phoebe falls in love with Ganymede and attempts to abandon her engagement to be with him.
- Twelfth Night, or What You Will (c. 1601–1602) depicts cross-dressing through its protagonist, Viola, who finds herself shipwrecked at the start of the play. She disguises herself as Cesario and immediately finds herself caught up in a love triangle: she loves Duke Orsino who loves Countess Olivia who loves Cesario. A frequent source of the play's comedy is found in the dramatic irony of challenging Cesario's manhood, which only the audience knows is nonexistent. Luckily, all is resolved when Viola's presumed dead twin brother Sebastian comes along.
- Cymbeline (c. 1611) in which Cymbeline's daughter, Imogen, dresses as a page and calls herself "Fidele".

In Chinese tanci (plucking rhymes) of the Ming and Qing dynasties, the disguised heroine often takes form of a male scholar. Characters like Meng Lijun (Zai Sheng Yuan) cross-dress to participate in the Imperial Examination system, rising to the rank of prime minister.

Edmund Spenser's The Faerie Queene (1590-1596) includes a long section about Britomart, who dons male armor, falls in love with a woman, and has many adventures as a man.

In Arcadia (1593), Sir Philip Sidney has one of the heroes, Pyrocles, disguise himself as an Amazon called Zelmane in order to approach his beloved Philoclea.

Belle-Belle ou Le Chevalier Fortuné (1698), a fairy tale by Madame d'Aulnoy in which the female protagonist, Belle-Belle, disguises herself as a male knight to help the ruler of her kingdom defeat an emperor.

== 18th and 19th-century literature ==
Literature of the late 17th and early 18th-centuries often mirrored the theatrical popularity of breeches role employing female-to-male disguise as a mechanism for comedy and erotic fascination. Many works were also influenced by the Comedia dell'arte archetypes, where the lover frequently disguised herself as a page to secretly travel. Works of these centuries typically featured cross-dressing as an opportunity for characters to escape the rigid gender and class boundaries of society; Victorian sensationalist fiction featured cross-dressing motifs frequently for these reasons.

- The Monk (1796), written by Matthew Lewis, depicts Matilda, a young woman who disguises herself as a boy named Rosario to study in Ambrosio's monastery. Her ruse is further complicated by the reveal that "Matilda" is a further disguise for an emissary of Satan, sent upon Ambrosio to make him fall to sin.
- Lord Byron's Don Juan (1819–1824) features the titular Don Juan disguised as a woman in a harem.
- Mademoiselle de Maupin by Theophile Gautier (1834) in which the eponymous heroine dresses as a man to discover what men are like when not in the company of women before she gets married.
- In Riau Penyengat, a subgenre of Malay syair (narrative poems) emerged featuring a victorious wife archetype. Works such as Syair Siti Zubaidah and Syair Sultan Yahya depict heroines who assume male identity as kings or warriors after their husbands are incapacitated.
- Charlotte Brontë's Jane Eyre (1847) depicts Mr Rochester cross-dressing as a Gypsy fortune-teller in order to fool Jane into confessing her love for him.
- War and Peace (1869) - Nicholas dresses in a hooped skirt, Petya dresses as a Turkish girl, Natasha dresses as a hussar, and Sonya dresses as a Circassian with a burnt-cork mustache and eyebrows to go mummering. This event is what sparks Nicholas's romantic interest in Sonya.
- In Conrad Ferdinand Meyer's novella Gustav Adolf's Page (1882), a businessman's much braver orphaned niece "Guste", in disguise as a man, goes to serve in the military, rather than his cowardly son August, under the command of the Swedish king in the Thirty Years' War.
- In Mark Twain's Adventures of Huckleberry Finn (1884), Huckleberry disguises himself as a girl while on the run and calls himself Sarah Williams. His disguise fails almost immediately when he gives typically masculine responses to the tests of Mrs. Loftus, who remarks that his half-hearted ruse would only fool men.
- The Black Arrow: A Tale of the Two Roses (1888) by Robert Louis Stevenson - Joanna Sedley is disguised as a boy by Sir Daniel so he can marry her without interference.
- A Scandal in Bohemia (1891), Irene Alder dresses as a man who wish Sherlock Holmes goodbye.

== 20th and 21st-century literature ==
Modern literature has seen a shift in the function of disguise to job or vocational access, reflecting contemporary debates about women in a certain industry reserved for males. Additionally, in post-colonial literature, cross-dressing is often used as a metaphor for cultural mimicry, where characters adopt Western dress to navigate colonial power structures. War memoirs and fictionalized accounts of female soldiers (Deborah Sampson) created a subgenre that challenged notions of female weakness during wartime. Young Adult series like Tamora Pierce's Song of the Lionness, cross-dressing is not only a plot device but a long-term professional necessity for gender-restricted careers. In speculative and Cyberpunk fiction, digital avatars allow characters to inhabit different genders in virtual reality, detaching identity from the physical body entirely.

"The current popularity of cross-dressing as a theme in art and
criticism represents, I think, an undertheorized recognition of the
necessary critique of binary thinking, whether particularized as
male and female, black and white, yes and no, Republican and
Democrat, self and other, or in any other way."
—Marjorie Garber, 1991

=== As a relevant theme ===
- These Old Shades by Georgette Heyer (1926); historical novel. During the reign of Louis XV, a girl disguises herself as a boy.
- The Masqueraders, by Georgette Heyer (1928); historical novel. Two siblings impersonate the opposite gender to escape persecution after the 1745 Jacobite Rising.
- In Anthony Powell's From a View to a Death (1933), Major Fosdick's penchant for going to his room and donning a black sequin evening dress and a large picture-hat ultimately leads to his unraveling.
- The Corinthian by Georgette Heyer (1940); historical novel. In which a young woman disguises herself as a boy in order to escape an unwanted marriage to her cousin.
- The Famous Five book series (1942) - Georgina wears boy's clothes, prefers to be called "George" and is pleased to be mistaken for a boy.
- In Tolkien's The Lord of the Rings (1954-1955), Éowyn disguises herself as man under the name Dernhelm to fight in the Battle of the Pelennor Fields outside the city Minas Tirith, and confronts the Witch-King of Angmar, Lord of the Nazgûl.
- In the short story "Man for All Work" by Richard Wright, collected in the story collection Eight Men (1961), the plot focuses on Carl, a desperate Black husband and father who disguises himself as a woman to get domestic work and provide for his family.
- Yentl the Yeshiva Boy (1962) by Isaac Bashevis Singer - A young Jewish girl in Poland dresses and lives as a man in order to study Talmudic Law; in 1983 it was adapted into the film Yentl starring Barbra Streisand.
- The Rose of Versailles (1972) - The female protagonist, Oscar François de Jarjayes, dresses as a man, but privately acknowledges her feminine side.
- Song of the Lioness - The main character, Alanna, disguises herself as a boy to become a knight.
- Johnny, My Friend (a translation of the Swedish novel Janne, min vän from 1985) - Johnny is a girl disguising as a boy.
- In Giannina Braschi's mock diary, "Intimate Diary of Solitude", the third part in her postmodern poetry collection Empire of Dreams (1988), the heroine Mariquita Samper is a cross-dressing Macy's makeup artist who plots a literary revolution to kill the narrator.
- Soldier's Secret - A fictional retelling by Sheila Solomon Klass of Deborah Sampson's life, who disguises herself as a soldier during the Revolutionary War.
- Hana Kimi - A manga where the female protagonist, Ashiya Mizuki, disguises herself as a boy to attend an all-boys school that her idol attends.
- In Tamora Pierce's The Song of the Lioness series (1983–1988), the main character, Alanna, disguises herself as a boy for eight years in order to become a knight.
- The Outlaws of Sherwood (1988) by Robin McKinley - A young girl disguises herself as a boy and joins Robin Hood's band of outlaws.
- Rowan Hood: Outlaw Girl of Sherwood Forest (2002) by Nancy Springer - A girl dresses as a boy to find her father, the famous outlaw Robin Hood.
- In Ouran High School Host Club, a series by Bisco Hatori, a female student named Haruhi works as a male host in the titular host club to pay off her debt.
- Monstrous Regiment (2003) by Terry Pratchett - After her brother vanishes, Polly Perks dresses up like a man to find him. The novel additionally satirizes wartime cross-dressing.
- Boy2Girl (2004) by Terence Blacker - Sam, the main character Matthew's male American cousin, is dared to go to school disguised as a girl as a challenge to prove himself to Matthew and his friends. However, the prank doesn't turn out the way it was planned.
- In the Princess Princess series by Mikiyo Tsuda, a young male student is invited to join an elite club at his new school whose members dress like girls.
- Leviathan (2009) by Scott Westerfeld - Deryn Sharp, a young girl, dresses up like a man so she can join the British Air Service.
- The Pearl that Broke Its Shell (2014), a novel by Nadia Hashimi - An Afghan girl named Rahima in 2007 needs to adopt the ancient custom of bacha posh in order to take care of herself and her sisters. Her great-aunt, Shekiba, saved herself and built a new life the same way a decade earlier after being left orphaned.

=== As a minor plot element ===
- The Scarlet Pimpernel (1905) - The Scarlet Pimpernel dresses as a violently anti-monarchist woman to smuggle French aristocrats out of danger in revolutionary France.
- The Wind in the Willows (1908) by Kenneth Grahame - Toad escapes from prison dressed as a washerwoman.
- Simon the Coldheart by Georgette Heyer (1925); historical novel. In which Lady Margaret disguises herself as a young man in order to escape captivity.
- The Password to Larkspur Lane (1933), Ned Nickerson poses as a nurse.
- Cigars of the Pharaoh (1934), Tintin dresses up as an old woman to escape Thomson and Thompson.
- The Talisman Ring by Georgette Heyer (1936) is a historical novel in which the young male protagonist disguises himself as a maid in order to escape the Bow Street Runners.
- In Frenchman's Creek (1941), Dona dresses as a man to be with Aubéry.
- The Return of the King (part of The Lord of the Rings) (1955) - Éowyn disguises herself as the man Dernhelm and travels with the Riders of Rohan to the Battle of the Pelennor Fields.
- To the Hilt (1996), a crime novel by Dick Francis. The protagonist hires a young private detective who is skilled in disguise, mainly disguising himself as a woman.

== See also ==
- Cross-dressing in film and television
- Cross-dressing in music and opera
