= Missing You =

Missing You, Missin' You, or Missing U may refer to:

== Film and television ==
- Missing You (2008 film), a Singaporean film
- Missing You (2016 film), a South Korean film
- Missing U (film), a 2013 short animated film by Brooke Wagstaff
- Missing You (Hong Kong TV series), a 2012–2013 drama starring Linda Chung and Jason Chan
- Missing You (South Korean TV series), a 2012–2013 drama starring Yoochun and Yoon Eun-hye
- Missing You (2025 TV series), a Netflix adaptation of the Harlan Coben novel (see below)

== Literature ==
- Missing You, a 2006 novel by Meg Cabot
- Missing You (Coben novel), a 2014 novel by Harlan Coben

== Music ==
=== Albums ===
- Missing You (The Marcy Brothers album) or the title song, 1989
- Missing You (Peabo Bryson album) or the title song, 2007
- Missing You, by E-Rotic, 2000
- Missing You, by Fann Wong, 1999
- Missing You, by Fly to the Sky, 2003
- Missing You, by Gina Thompson, 2009
- Missing You, by John Ellison, 2000
- Missing You, by Sammi Cheng, 1996
- Missing You, an EP by the Vamps, 2019

=== Songs ===
- "Missing You" (2NE1 song), 2013
- "Missing You" (Black Eyed Peas song), 2010
- "Missing You" (Brandy, Gladys Knight, Tamia, and Chaka Khan song), from the film Set It Off, 1996
- "Missing You" (Case song), 2001
- "Missin' You" (Charley Pride song), 1979
- "Missing You" (Chris de Burgh song), 1988
- "Missing You" (Christy Moore song), a 1980s folk song written by Jimmy MacCarthy
- "Missing You" (Dan Fogelberg song), 1982
- "Missing You" (Diana Ross song), 1984
- "Missing You" (Ingrid Michaelson song), 2019
- "Missing You" (John Waite song), 1984, covered by Tina Turner (1996) and Brooks & Dunn (1999)
- "Missing You" (Mary J. Blige song), 1997
- "Missing You" (Red Sovine song), 1955, covered by Webb Pierce (1957), Ray Peterson (1961), and Jim Reeves (1964)
- "Missing You" (The Saturdays song), 2010
- "Missing You" (Soul II Soul song), 1990
- "Missing You" (Steve Perry song), 1994
- "Missing U" (song), by Robyn, 2018
- "Missing You", by Alex Gaudino, 2013
- "Missing You", by All Time Low from Future Hearts, 2015
- "Missing You", by Artful & Ridney featuring Terri Walker, 2013
- "Missing You", by Betty Who from Take Me When You Go, 2014
- "Missing You", by Beverley Craven from Beverley Craven, 1990
- "Missing You", by Bob Mould from Body of Song, 2005
- "Missing You", by Brand New from Leaked Demos 2006, 2015
- "Missing You", by BtoB from Brother Act., 2017
- "Missing You", by Budjerah, 2020
- "Missing You", by Chance the Rapper from 10 Day, 2012
- "Missing You", by Coro from Coro, 1991
- "Missing You", by David Guetta featuring Novel from One Love, 2009
- "Missing You", by Green Day from ¡Tré!
- "Missing You", by Hunter Hayes from Red Sky
- "Missing You", by Jolin Tsai from J-Game, 2005
- "Missing You", by Kim English from Higher Things, 1998
- "Missing You", by Lucy Carr, 2002
- "Missing You", by the Reklaws from Freshman Year, 2019
- "Missing You", by Stephen Sanchez featuring Ashe, 2022
- "Missing You", by Trace Adkins from Comin' On Strong, 2003
- "Missin' You", by Trey Songz from Trey Day, 2007
- "Missing You: It Will Break My Heart", by Ken Hirai from Life Is..., 2003
- "Missing You: Time to Love", by Nami Tamaki from Ready!, 2011

== See also ==
- "I Am Missing You", a 1974 song by Ravi Shankar
- "I'm Missin' You", a 2000 song by Shirley Myers
- Miss You (disambiguation)
- I Miss You (disambiguation)
