= Emma Pérez =

American author and professor (born 1954)

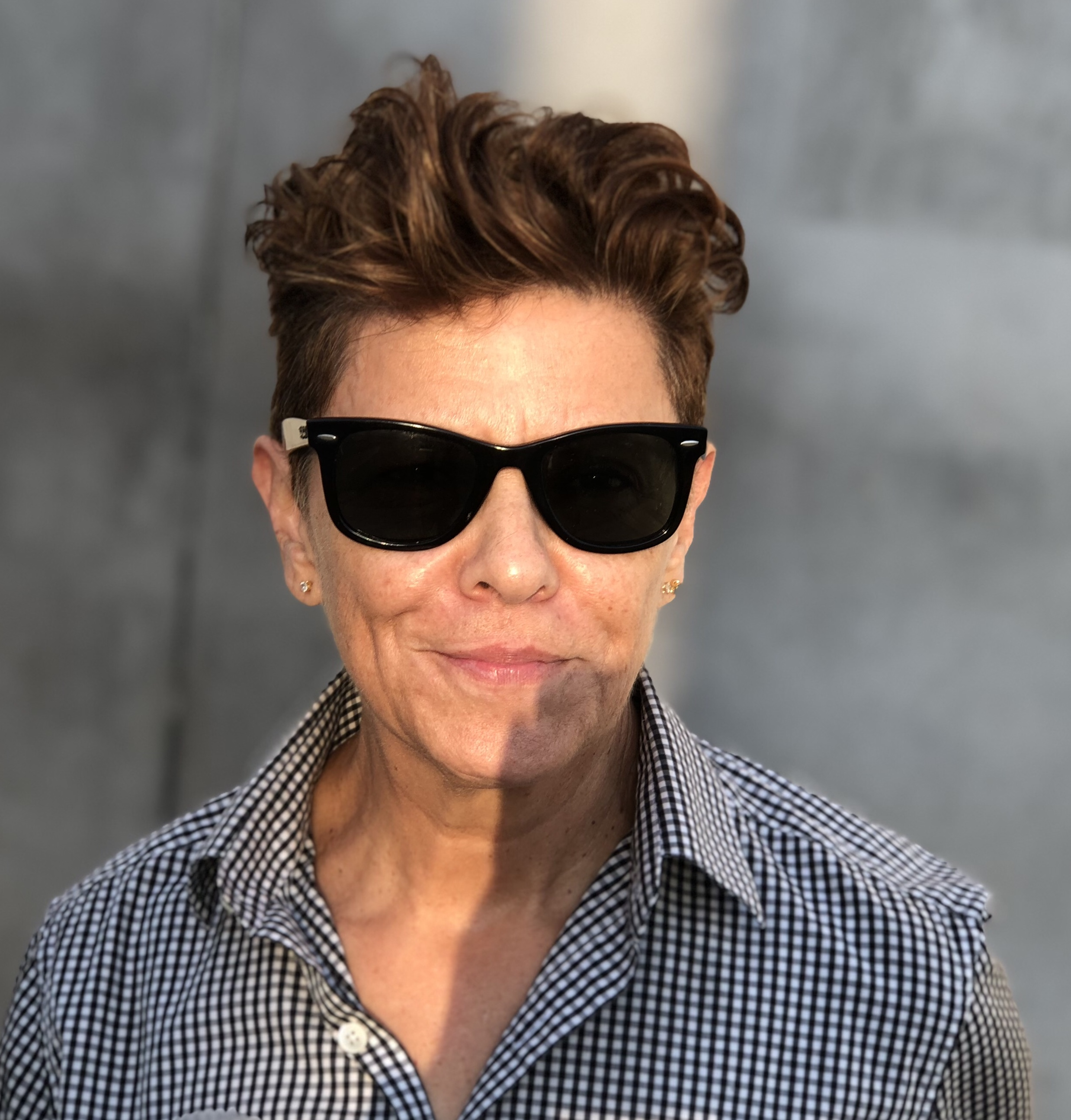
- Born: October 25, 1954 (age 72); El Campo, Texas

Academic background
- Education: University of California, Los Angeles

Academic work
- Institutions: University of Arizona
- Main interests: Feminism; Queer Studies; Postcolonial Feminism

Emma Pérez is an American author and professor, known for her work in queer Chicana feminist studies.

== Biography ==
Pérez was born in El Campo, Texas on October 25, 1954. In 1979, she received an undergraduate degree in political science and women's studies from the University of California, Los Angeles. She obtained her master's and doctorate in history from the University of California, Los Angeles in 1982 and 1988, respectively.

Pérez was a professor at the University of Texas at El Paso (1990–2003), where she became the Chair of the History Department. In 2003, she became a professor and the chair of the department of Ethnic Studies at the University of Colorado at Boulder and taught in their Ph.D. in Comparative Ethnic Studies.

Since 2017, Pérez has been a research social scientist at the Southwest Studies Center at the University of Arizona where she is also a professor in the Gender and Women's Studies department.

As a scholar, she specializes in Chicana history, feminist studies, queer history, and decolonial theory.

== Writing ==
=== Literary contributions ===
Pérez's first literary work, Gulf Dreams, published in 1996, is a coming of age story set in a small racist Texas town. It touches on childhood sexual abuse, the legacies of colonialism, sexual repression, and same-sex desire and is considered to be one of the first Chicana lesbian novels in print.

Her second novel, published in 2009, Forgetting the Alamo, Or Blood Memory, is a historical fiction set against the backdrop of the 1836 battles of the Alamo and of San Jacinto. It is a tale of travel and adventure that narrates the story of a young cross-dressing tejana and her romance with a mixed race woman, both of whom are witnesses to the racial complexities of the southwest during this turbulent period. It is suggested that the novel "inverts the traditional Alamo narrative" in order to highlight the racial violence of that historic event. Forgetting the Alamo won the Christopher Isherwood Writing Grant in 2009, the National Association for Chicana/Chicano Studies Regional Book Award for fiction in 2011 and was a finalist for the Lambda Literary Awards in 2010. According to Rocky Mountain Modern Language Association "Forgetting the Alamo, Or Blood Memory" proposes that sexuality and gender are inextricably linked to language, culture, and race, something that has been under-theorized in many articulations of queer and feminist theory".

Her third book, Electra's Complex was nominated for the Golden Crown Literary Award. It is an erotic murder mystery set on a university campus that features the sexual adventures of a Chicana lesbian professor, her trans man best friend, and the detective assigned to the case. Critic Kendy Rivera argues that the book reclaims and re-imagines negative stereotypes about masculine women and butches, even as it appropriates and queers the womanizing behaviors associated with machista cultures for butch women.

=== Academic contributions ===
The Decolonial Imaginary: Writing Chicanas into History (1999) is recognized as one of the founding influences of decolonial studies and of queer of color critique. It is credited with offering new understandings of Chicano historiography by highlighting the role of archival silences, erasures, and omissions in the production of knowledge. Pérez argues that the shadow of colonialism inflects how history is understood and challenges readers to construct a "decolonial imaginary" as a way to challenge dominant narratives of history. The book develops the idea of third space feminism by looking at different discursive events including Yucatán's Socialist Revolution, El Partido Liberal Mexicano, and Texas social clubs. Pérez's theoretical formation is credited with connecting Chicana and women of color feminist thought to the work of Michel Foucault, Jacques Lacan, Homi Bhaba and other postcolonial theorists.

In 2020, Emma Pérez updated her initial academic contribution, The Decolonial Imaginary: Writing Chicanas into History (1999) to The Imaginary as Will to Feel: Beyond the Decolonial Turn in Chicanx/Latinx Feminism (2020). Perez revamped her original work to better represent and further the idea of equality in history regarding gender and the gender experience by taking a more internal, individual approach. Perez argues that her old theory was too broad, generalized, and borrowed as well as did not leave enough room for the individual imaginary. Perez states her new stance will have its own hermeneutics, as well as its own method and theory in comparison to her previous 1999 book, The Decolonial Imaginary: Writing Chicanas into History. The updated book develops on Perez's new point and idea of the “will to feel” in which she presses the question of whether or not the world can have the “will to feel” differently about the unjustness of Chicanx/Latinx individuals enough to cut them a space into public history and taken out of the interstitial spaces they currently reside in. Perez's updated theoretical formation offers new insight and problem-solving ideas from the influence of Michael Foucault, Emmanuel Levinas, Gloria Anzaldua, and other postcolonial theorists.

Alongside Gloria Anzaldúa and Cherríe Moraga, she is considered one of the most prolific Chicana feminists, especially for making sexuality a central part of Chicana feminism.

In 2020, Emma Pérez was inducted into the Texas Institute of Letters, a distinguished honor society founded in 1936 to celebrate Texas literature and to recognize distinctive literary achievement.

== Publications ==
Books

- Testimony of a Shifter, Arte Publico Press, 2023.
- Electra's Complex, Bella Books, May 2015.
- Forgetting the Alamo, Or, Blood Memory. Austin: University of Texas Press, Chicana Matters Series, September 2009.
- The Decolonial Imaginary: Writing Chicanas into History. Bloomington: Indiana University Press, June 1999.
- Gulf Dreams. Berkeley: Third Woman Press, 1996. San Francisco: Aunt Lute Books, 2009, reprint.
- Chicana Critical Issues. Edited by Norma Alarcón, Rafaela Castro, Emma Pérez, Beatríz Pesquera, Adaljiza Sosa Riddell, Patricia Zavella. Berkeley: Third Woman Press, 1993.

Journal articles

- "Gloria Anzaldúa, La Gran Nueva Mestiza Theorist, Writer, Activist Scholar." National Women's Studies Association Journal, 17:2 (Summer 2005): 1–10.
- "Borderland Queers: The Challenges of Excavating the Invisible and Unheard. " Frontiers: A Journal of Women's Studies 24: 2 and 3 (2003): 122–31.
- "So Far From God, So Close to the United States: A Call for Action by U.S. Authorities." Aztlán: A Journal of Chicano Studies, 28:2 (2003): 147–51.
- "Women's Studies on the Border: University of Texas at El Paso." With Scarlet Bowen. Women's Studies Quarterly, 30: 3 and 4 (2002): 73–81.
- "Oral Narratives as Chicana (His)tory Text." In Working Paper Series, No. 34, Southwest Institute for Research on Women, Tucson, Arizona, 1994, 1–24.
- "She Has Served Others in More Intimate Ways: The Domestic Service Reform in Yucatán, 1915–18." Aztlán: A Journal of Chicano Studies 20:1 (1993): 11–38.

Book chapters

- "Between Manifest Destiny and Women's Rights: Decolonizing Women's History." In Entre Guadalupe y Malinche: Tejanas in Literature and Art. Eds. Ines Hernandez-Avila and Norma Elia Cantu. Austin: University of Texas Press, 2016, 115–124.
- "Decolonial Border Queers: Case Studies of Lesbians, Gay Men and Transgender Folks in El Paso/Juárez." In Performing the US Latin@ Borderlands. Eds. Arturo J. Aldama, Peter J. Garcia, and Chela Sandoval. Bloomington: Indiana University Press, 2012, 192–211.
- "It's Not About the Gender in My Nation, But About the Nation in My Gender: The Decolonial Virgen in A Decolonial Site." In Our Lady of Controversy. Eds. Alicia Gaspar de Alba and Alma López. Austin: University of Texas Press, 2011, 148–163.
- "Decolonial Critics for Academic Freedom." In Academic Repression: Reflections from the Academic Industrial Complex. Eds. Anthony J. Nocella II, Steven Best, Peter McLaren. Oakland: AK Press, 2010, 364–373.
- "Chicana/o Cultural Studies: Marking Interdisciplinary Relationships and Conjunctures." In The Chicana/o Cultural Studies Forum: Critical and Ethnographic Practices. Ed. Angie Chabram-Dernersesian. New York: New York University Press, 2007, 40.
- "Staking the Claim: Introducing Applied Chicana/o Cultural Studies." In The Chicana/o Cultural Studies Forum: Critical and Ethnographic Practices. Ed. Angie Chabram-Dernersesian. New York: New York University Press, 2007, 121–124.
- "Chicana History." In Chicana/o Cultural Studies Reader. Ed. Angie Chabran-Dernersesian. New York: Routledge Press, 2006.
- "Chicanos and Chicanas." The Oxford Encyclopedia of Latinos and Latinas in the United States. Eds. Deena González and Suzanne Oboler. New York: Oxford University Press, Volume 1, 2005, 322–332.
- "Feminism-in-Nationalism: The Gendered Subaltern at the Yucatán Feminist Congresses of 1916." In Between Woman and Nation: Nationalisms, Transnational Feminisms and the State. Eds. Caren Kaplan, Norma Alarcón, and Minoo Moallem, 219–39. Durham: Duke University Press, 1999.
- "Irigaray's Female Symbolic in the Making of Chicana Lesbian Space and Language: Sitio y Lengua." In The Lesbian Postmodern. Ed. Laura Doan. New York: Columbia University Press, 1994. Reprint, Living Chicana Theory. Ed. Carla Trujillo, 87–101. Third Woman Press, 1998.
- "Speaking from the Margin: Uninvited Discourse on Sexuality and Power." In Building With Our Hands. Eds. Adela de La Torre and Beatriz Pesquera, 57–71. Berkeley: University of California Press, 1993. Reprint, Feminist Theory: A Reader. Eds. Wendy Kolmar and Frances Bartkowski, 490–497. Mountain View, California: Mayfield Publishing Company, 2000.
- "Sexuality and Discourse: Notes from a Chicana Survivor." In Chicana Lesbians. Ed. Carla Trujillo, 159–84. Berkeley: Third Woman Press, 1991.
- "A La Mujer: A Critique of the Mexican Liberal Party's Ideology on Women." In Between Borders. Ed. Adelaida Del Castillo, 459–82. Los Angeles: Floricanto Press, 1990.

Fiction

- "Trio." Short Story. Jota: Queer Latina Voices. T. Jackie Cueves, Anel I. Flores, Candace López, and Rita Urquijo-Ruíz, editors, Korima Press, 2016.
- "Here, Eat This." Prose Poem. In Edible Baja Arizona: Celebrating the foodways of Tucson and the borderlands: 14 (2015): 163.
- "Chichis." Novel excerpt. In JotaZine 3 (2006): 16–17.
- "Have Your Cake." Novel excerpt. In Voces: Chicana/Latina Journal 5: 2 (2006): 102–114.
- "Gulf Dreams." Novel excerpt. In Chloe Plus Olivia: An Anthology of Lesbian Literature From the Seventeenth Century to the Present. Ed. Lillian Faderman. New York: Viking Press, 1994, reprint.
