= Gloria Tapia =

Swedish actress (born 1972)

- Born: 5 March 1972 (age 54); Chile
- Education: Luleå Theater Academy
- Occupation: Actress
- Years active: 1991–present

Gloria Tapia (born 3 March 1972) is a Swedish actress. She was nominated for the award for Best Actress at the 27th Guldbagge Awards for her role in Agnes Cecilia – en sällsam historia.

She was born on 3 March 1962 in Chile. Her family left Chile after the 1973 coup d'état and came to Sweden as refugees. She attended Rudbeck gymnasium in Sollentuna.

She made her feature film debut as Eleonora "Nora" Hed in Agnes Cecilia – en sällsam historia (1991), an adaptation of Maria Gripe's novel of the same name. Tapia's performance was praised by Maaret Koskinen in Dagens Nyheter.

She graduated from Luleå Theatre Academy in 2003.

In 2024, she played a teacher in Young Royals.

== Acting credits ==
=== Film ===
Year	Title	Role	Notes	Ref.
1991	Agnes Cecilia – en sällsam historia	Eleonora "Nora" Hed	Nominated for Guldbagge	

=== Theater ===
Year	Title	Role	Theater	Notes	Ref.
2009	Nära livet	Hjördis	Östgöta Theatre in Norrköping		
2021	Mammorna	Ensemble	National Swedish Touring Theatre		
