= The Glassblower's Children =

- Swedish: Glasblåsarns barn
- Directed by: Anders Grönros
- Screenplay by: Anders Grönros
- Story by: Maria Gripe
- Produced by: Anders Birkeland; Hans Lönnerheden
- Cinematography: Philip Øgaard
- Release date: 27 February 1998 (Sweden)
- Running time: 111 minutes
- Countries: Sweden, Norway, Denmark
- Language: Swedish

The Glassblower's Children (Swedish: Glasblåsarns barn) is a Swedish film, first intended to open on 25 December 1996, but ending up released to cinemas in Sweden on 27 February 1998, directed by Anders Grönros. It is based on the novel with the same name by Maria Gripe.

== Cast ==
- Stellan Skarsgård – Albert
- Pernilla August – Sofia
- Thommy Berggren – the Emperor
- Elin Klinga – the Empress
- Lena Granhagen – Flaxa Mildväder
- Oliver P. Peldius – Klas
- Jasmine Heikura – Klara
- Ann-Cathrin Palme – Nana
- Måns Westfelt – the coachman
- Ewa Fröling – Nana (voice)
- Johan Ulveson – Kloke (voice)
- Helge Jordal – the glass-seller
- Margreth Weivers – the doll-selleress
- Martin Lange – a butler
- Peter Nystedt – a butler
