= Restless (2011 film) =

- Theatrical release poster
- Directed by: Gus Van Sant
- Written by: Jason Lew
- Produced by: Brian Grazer; Ron Howard; Bryce Dallas Howard; Gus Van Sant
- Starring: Henry Hopper; Mia Wasikowska; Ryō Kase; Schuyler Fisk; Jane Adams
- Cinematography: Harris Savides
- Edited by: Elliot Graham
- Music by: Danny Elfman
- Production companies: Imagine Entertainment; 360 Pictures
- Distributed by: Sony Pictures Classics (United States and Canada); Sony Pictures Releasing International (International)
- Release dates: May 12, 2011 (Cannes Film Festival); September 16, 2011 (United States)
- Running time: 91 minutes
- Country: United States
- Language: English
- Budget: $8 million (estimated)
- Box office: $2.8 million

Restless is a 2011 American romantic drama film directed by Gus Van Sant, written by Jason Lew, and produced by Brian Grazer, Ron Howard and his daughter Bryce Dallas Howard. The film stars Henry Hopper and Mia Wasikowska, with Ryō Kase, Schuyler Fisk, and Jane Adams playing supporting roles. The film was shot in Portland, Oregon.

Restless had its world premiere at the 64th Cannes Film Festival on May 12, 2011, where it was presented in the Un Certain Regard section. It was theatrically released in the United States on September 16, 2011, by Sony Pictures Classics.

== Plot ==
Teenager Enoch Brae takes the death of his parents hard and lives with his aunt and guardian Mabel. A year ago, his parents died in a car accident, while he himself experienced clinical death and was in a coma for a month. Enoch does not go to school (he was expelled after a fight with a student who spoke badly about his dead parents) and has an unusual hobby—attending strangers' funerals; he also befriends the Japanese ghost of kamikaze pilot Hiroshi, who he began to see after waking up from his coma.

At one of the funerals, he meets teenage girl Annabel. After they grow closer, Annabel tells him she is a volunteer at a hospital for children with cancer, and they start spending time together. Later, Annabel confesses that she lied: she herself suffers from brain cancer and has three months to live. Enoch tells Annabel that he can help her get ready and offers to spend this time as fun as possible. Their relationship becomes romantic, and Enoch no longer needs to attend funerals and spend all his time with a ghost.

Onсе the couple quarrels and Enoch, deeply traumatized by the theme of death, realizes that he will soon lose Annabel like his parents. In desperation, he destroys the monument to his parents and demands Annabel's doctor help her. Meanwhile, Annabel is getting worse, and the couple reunite in the hospital. Enoch reconciles with his aunt, and sees for the last time Hiroshi, who decides to accompany Annabel on her last journey. Annabel dies, but Enoch is left with a memory of their short relationship that changed him and his attitude to life.

== Cast ==
- Henry Hopper as Enoch Brae
- Mia Wasikowska as Annabel "Annie" Cotton
- Ryō Kase as Hiroshi Takahashi, a ghost and Enoch's friend
- Schuyler Fisk as Elizabeth Cotton, Annabel's older sister
- Jane Adams as Mabel Tell, Enoch's aunt and guardian
- Chin Han as Dr. Lee, Annabel's physician
- Lusia Strus as Rachel Cotton, Annabel and Elizabeth's mother

== Production ==
=== Pre-production and casting ===
The film was produced through Columbia Pictures and Imagine Entertainment by daughter and father Bryce Dallas Howard and Ron Howard, as well as Brian Grazer. In August 2009, Gus Van Sant signed on to direct Restless. Based on a play by Jason Lew, the story centers on young love and mortality. Lew and Bryce Dallas Howard were fellow drama students at New York University; she encouraged him to take his project further and agreed to be a producer on the script. Her father Ron wanted to direct, but his schedule did not allow for it. "It was honestly like, 'If we could get a Gus Van Sant-type director...' That's what we were saying. We never thought we would actually get him to direct it," Bryce Dallas Howard said in an interview for the film's soundtrack release. "But he said yes immediately, and five weeks later we were shooting."

Casting was done in Los Angeles with the intention of casting unknowns for the leads. In October 2009, Mia Wasikowska joined the project as the female lead. The following November, Henry Hopper was cast as the male lead.

=== Filming ===
Principal photography began in Portland, Oregon on November 12, 2009, and concluded in December. Post-production was completed in July 2010. Wasikowska cut her hair for the film.

The film is dedicated to the memory of actor Dennis Hopper, Henry Hopper's father, who died of cancer in May 2010.

== Soundtrack ==
In 2013 La-La Land Records released a limited edition album of Danny Elfman's score.

Track listing (the titles are intentionally all in lower case):

1. titles 2:41
2. battleship 1:09
3. reconciliation 1:26
4. sorry for your loss 1:54
5. waterbirds 1:43
6. meet the parents 2:20
7. on the beach 2:09
8. hiroshima 1:06
9. morning affair 1:33
10. morgue 1:18
11. crime scene 2:45
12. death scene 2:06
13. happy dead girl 1:11
14. battleship 2 1:50
15. a ghost 1:00
16. the letter 1:34
17. parents' grave 1:49
18. weepy donuts 3:31
19. enoch's goodbye 1:21

== Release ==
A trailer was released in October 2010. Restless was initially scheduled for release on January 28, 2011, but Columbia announced that they had pulled it from that slot in hopes of opening it later in the year. Columbia consequently withdrew the film from the 2011 Sundance Film Festival lineup as well.

The film opened the Un Certain Regard section of the 64th Cannes Film Festival on May 12, 2011. Restless was theatrically released in the United States on September 16, 2011, by Sony Pictures Classics.

=== Home media ===
The film was released on DVD and Blu-ray on January 24, 2012. In addition to numerous featurettes, the Blu-ray release also contains a silent version of the film. The silent version runs at 76 minutes and contains takes in which Van Sant asked the actors to act as if there was a silent version of the script.

== Reception ==
On review aggregator Rotten Tomatoes, the film has an approval rating of 36% based on 110 reviews, with an average rating of 5.1/10. The site's critical consensus reads, "Mia Wasikowska puts in a nuanced performance but nobody else, actors and directors included, are capable of finding a compelling angle beneath the twee veneer." On Metacritic, the film has an average score of 47 out of 100, based on 30 critics, indicating "mixed or average reviews".

Noted film critic Roger Ebert (Chicago Sun-Times) gave the film 3/4 stars and called it "wholly fresh and beguiling". Critic Peter Travers of Rolling Stone gave the film 2.5/4 stars: "Wasikowska, from Alice in Wonderland to Jane Eyre, is an actress of translucent expressiveness. And Hopper has his father’s brooding intensity and a quicksilver humor all his own. They are both so good, I suggest you dive into the story unfolding in their eyes rather than the banal one in the script." Film critic James Berardinelli described Restless as "an emotionally rewarding experience: strong performances from leads Henry Hopper and Mia Wasikowska and a tender love story conveyed with genuine feeling".

Sheri Linden of Los Angeles Times described Restless as "Director Gus Van Sant's attempt to bring an indie spirit to screenwriter Jason Lew's pedestrian romantic drama. [...] The insistently quirky details don't disguise the fact that the drama grows ever more predictable and precious, complete with falling-in-love montage." Ann Hornaday of The Washington Post wrote: "Mia Wasikowska and Henry Hopper - making an assured debut - manage to deliver distinctive performances here as wise, attractively troubled teenagers [...] They manage to bring winsome charm to "Restless".

Jake Coyle of Associated Press wrote: "Hopper, who handles humor well and has something of his father's roguishness, and Wasikowska, the fine young actress of Jane Eyre and In Treatment, are well matched. [...] Nevertheless, the material isn't up to Van Sant's abilities, and the impression of Restless is of a filmmaker playing with familiar themes". Film critic Leonard Maltin wrote: "Restless adds to my ever-growing admiration for Mia Wasikowska and provides a pleasant sense of discovery in seeing Dennis Hopper’s son acquit himself so well in a part that any actor would find challenging to put across." Liam Lacey of The Globe and Mail wrote that "Restless feels counterfeit in any scenes that deal with real matters of illness and death".

Derek Malcolm of London Evening Standard wrote, "This paean to the troubles of youth has none of Van Sant's edge, which seems to have been replaced by whimsicality". Rich Cline of Shadow on the Wall wrote: "Hopper has a terrific screen presence that holds our attention from the start. He may be slightly too beautiful, but he has a compelling inner life that conveys Enoch's teen fragility and resilience. But then we can't take our eyes off Wasikowska, who delivers yet another magnetic performance packed with unexpected emotion and offhanded humour".
