= Maria Gripe =

Swedish children's writer (1923–2007)

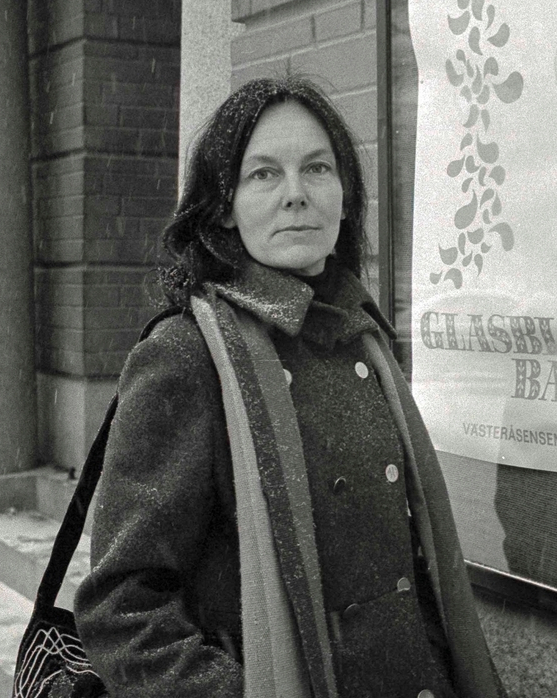
- Gripe in 1974
- Born: Maja Stina Walter; 25 July 1923; Vaxholm, Sweden
- Died: 5 April 2007 (aged 83); Rönninge, Sweden
- Occupations: Journalist, writer
- Writing career
- Language: Swedish
- Period: 1954–1997
- Genre: children's literature

Maria Gripe, born Maja Stina Walter (25 July 1923 – 5 April 2007), was a Swedish author of books for children and young adults, which were often written in magical and mystical tone. She has written almost forty books, with many of her characters presented in short series of three or four books (e.g., the Hugo and Josephine books, the Shadow series, and the titles about Lotten). For her lasting contribution to children's literature, she received the Hans Christian Andersen Medal for Writing in 1974.

== Biography ==
Maja Stina Walter was born in Vaxholm, Uppland, Sweden. When Maria was six, her family moved from Vaxholm to Örebro. They moved again to Stockholm for her secondary schooling and studies at Stockholm University.

In 1946 she married the artist Harald Gripe, who created cover illustrations for most of her books. His illustration career, in fact, began in connection with his wife's debut as the author of I vår lilla stad ("In our little town"). Maria Gripe's first major success was Josephine (1961), the first of a series of novels that later included Hugo and Josephine and Hugo.

During most of her adult life, Maria Gripe lived in Nyköping, where an adaptation of her book Agnes Cecilia was filmed. After a long period of dementia, Maria Gripe died at 83 in a nursing home in Rönninge outside Stockholm; her husband Harald had predeceased her by 15 years. Their daughter Camilla Gripe is also a children's author.

== Writing style ==
Much of her writing, particularly the later work, is suffused with a supernatural or mystical element. Fairy-tales were recurring motifs and these were often intertwined with psychological realism presented in a poetic style. The change in her writing style from her less mature work was partly a result of the influence of Edgar Allan Poe, Charlotte and Emily Brontë, and Carl Jonas Love Almquist, and partly a reaction to violence in entertainment that had begun to gain ground in cultural expression; Gripe sought to manufacture plot tension in less overt ways.

A prominent feature of Maria Gripe's writing is a respect for individuals and their unique characteristics, a trait which is especially perceptible in the social realism of the Elvis series, which she co-wrote with her husband Harald in the 1970s.

Another recurring leitmotif in Gripe's books is shadow, particularly in the series which began with Skuggan över stenbänken ("The shadow on the stone bench", 1982).

== Books in English translation ==
- Josephine (Josefin, 1961)
- Hugo and Josephine (Hugo och Josefin, 1962)
- Pappa Pellerin's Daughter (Pappa Pellerins dotter, 1963)
- The Glassblower's Children (Glasblåsarns barn, 1964)
- In the Time of the Bells (I klockornas tid, 1965)
- Hugo (Hugo, 1966)
- The Land Beyond (Landet utanför, 1967)
- The Night Daddy (Nattpappan, 1968)
- Julia's House (Julias hus och nattpappan, 1971)
- Elvis and his Secret (Elvis Karlsson, 1972)
- Elvis and his Friends (Elvis! Elvis!, 1973)
- The Green Coat (...ellen, dellen..., 1974)
- Agnes Cecilia (Agnes Cecilia – en sällsam historia, 1981)

== Adaptations and translations ==
Gripe wrote 38 books, translated into 30 different languages, making her one of Sweden's most prolific writers. Her last published book was Annas blomma ("Anna's Flower", 1997). Several of Gripe's books have been filmed, such as Glasblåsarns barn ("The Glassblower's Children") and Agnes Cecilia - en sällsam historia ("Agnes Cecilia: a singular history"), directed by Anders Grönros in the 1990s. In 1967, Kjell Grede directed Hugo and Josephine, considered the first Swedish children's film, which received critical acclaim for its artistic value as well as for the story itself. In 1976, Kay Pollak also filmed Elvis! Elvis! (Elvis and his friends), which Gripe co-wrote with him after his serial The Secret Reality made a profound impression on the author. There is also Marianne Ahrne who directed the 1989 television series Flickan vid stenbänken ("The girl by the stone bench", based on the "Shadow" series).

Dramatized versions of Tordyveln flyger i skymningen ("The scarab flies at dusk") and Agnes Cecilia were produced as radio serials, and an audio version of Tanten ("The elderly lady"), narrated by Margaretha Krook, was also recorded for radio. Gripe also wrote the original Swedish television script for Trolltider ("Magic Time", 1979).

== Recognition for Gripe's work ==
The biennial Hans Christian Andersen Award conferred by the International Board on Books for Young People is the highest recognition available to a writer or illustrator of children's books. Gripe received the writing award in 1974.

Stockholm University Literature professor Boel Westin praised Maria Gripe to a writer for Svenska Dagbladet, declaring that her Shadow books presented an exciting narrative that enabled readers to feel as if they were participants: "She has meant a lot. She renewed children's prose."

Literary researcher Ying Toijer-Nilsson, who wrote a biography Skuggornas förtrogna ("Confidant to shadows") of the author, echoed the remarks, saying that she would miss "the warm and humorous human being who was Maria Gripe." The biographer continued: "She has done a lot for the children's book world, and she got her readers to think about philosophy, about the world and about death." Toijer-Nilsson pointed out that Gripe's books also have "a significant tendency to support the social advancement of women."

Her books have won many awards. She was the first recipient of Expressens Heffaklump in 1966. She was the 1979 Swedish winner of the Dobloug Prize for Swedish and Norwegian fiction. In 1985 she was awarded the Nordic Children's Book Prize. Gripe's publisher Bonnier Carlsen established the Maria Gripe Prize in 2005, which is a literary prize awarded annually.
