= Vi kallar honom Anna =

Book by Peter Pohl

- First edition cover
- Author: Peter Pohl
- Language: Swedish
- Published: 1987 (Swedish); 1989 (Danish); 1989 (Norwegian); 1991 (German); 1993 (Danish)
- Publisher: AWE/Geber
- Publication place: Sweden

Vi kallar honom Anna (We call him Anna) is a 1987 Swedish novel by Peter Pohl. It is about Anders, a boy visiting a summer camp who is severely bullied. It is written from the perspective of Micke, one of the leaders of the summer camp.

Vi kallar honom Anna has been translated into Dutch (We noemen hem Anna, 1993), German (Nennen wir ihn Anna, 1991), Danish (Vi kalder ham Anna, 1989) and Norwegian (Vi kaller ham Anna, 1989).

It is the fifth book from the rainbow series. Micke's experiences may be autobiographic. Micke is youth leader for sports in the same summer camp and the same period as Pohl was. Both do running and win prizes, are the same age and pass for the exams at Södra Latin in the same year. Further, the very sparse references to Micke's past correspond with Pohl's.

It is not clear whether it is a youth book or a book for adults. It can be read in different ways, by children (13+) as well as by adults. Some libraries place it in the youth section, while others place it with the adults' books. It describes both the fate of a 14-year-old boy, as well as the psychological impact his fate has on a 17-year-old boy.

== Plot summary ==
The story starts in 1958. Anders Roos, 14 years old, arrives one week late at Södra Latins' summer camp (which is 10 weeks in total). The leaders of the camp have put him in another barrack than his peers, because they know there are "troubles" at school. Usually peers are together. The other people in the barrack have to decide on a nickname for him: all people in the camp have one. They decide to call him Anna because they think he looks like a girl. Anders is far too small for his age, cannot play football and cannot swim.

At summer camp, Anders is severely bullied. In the morning, when all boys have to fix their bed, the other people will not let him. This results in a low number of points, and because he gets a low number of points for his bed, the other boys throw him into the sea. A number of times, he is beaten up so badly that he is unable to leave his bed for many days. The camp leaders do not want to send anyone home: the camp reputation would be severely damaged.

Micke is the sports' leader at the camp. Through the ten weeks at summer camp, Anders discovers that he can trust Micke. He tells Micke that he is the only one he likes: at home, his father mistreats him. When he eats, his father tells him exactly how much money he owes. On the other hand, his father always complains that Anders is much too small and that he is an imbecile. He also forces him to watch when he rapes his mother. Micke finds it very difficult to react to this openness, but tries to be open and be a friend.

When the summer camp is finished, Micke needs to work for his exams, at the end of the year. He also trains a lot, and wins a lot of matches by running fastest. He has hardly any time left for Anders, and the few times he sees him, Anders tells him a lot about how he is mistreated everywhere. Micke finds it increasingly difficult to know how to handle the situation. He tries to contact the school about it, but the school direction does not believe that there is any bullying at Södra Latins.

Later, it seems Anders' life might be getting better, because he and his mother are finally moving out of his fathers' house and Anders may be able to change school. However, at a later moment, Anders has a fight with his mother. The neighbours, who he visits sometimes, are not at home, and he cannot find Micke either. At this moment, he commits suicide by hanging himself.

When Micke visits Anders' parents after his suicide, Anders' father asks Micke if he wants to sell his model railway track.

== Major themes ==
The theme can be summarized by a citation that occurs several times in the book:

Man bör tänka sig själv som en person som finns i framtiden och kan bedöma - fördöma eller gilla - det jag som handlar idag, det jag som håller stånd eller sviker. -- Eyvind Johnson "Om mod", I angeläget ärende, Tor Andreæ, Stockholm 1941,

This could be translated as "One should view oneself as someone in the future looking back — approving or disapproving — the self that acts today, the self that either makes a stand or gives in."

== Awards and nominations ==
- German book of the month in September 1991, by Bulletin Jugend + Literatur
- Nominated for the German Jugendliteraturpreis, 1992
- Dutch Vlag en Wimpel, 1994, by the Stichting Collectieve Propaganda van het Nederlandse Boek

== Sources and further reading ==
- Peter Pohl on Vi kallar honnom Anna (Swedish)
- Text on the backside of the book (Swedish)
