= 27th Guldbagge Awards =

Annual Swedish film awards ceremony

- Date: 16 March 1992
- Site: Cirkus, Stockholm
- Hosted by: Tomas Bolme; Kim Anderzon

Highlights
- Best Picture: Il Capitano: A Swedish Requiem
- Most awards: Agnes Cecilia – en sällsam historia (2)
- Most nominations: Il Capitano: A Swedish Requiem & Agnes Cecilia – en sällsam historia (4)

Television coverage
- Network: TV4

The 27th Guldbagge Awards ceremony, presented by the Swedish Film Institute, honored the best Swedish films of 1991, and took place on 16 March 1992. Il Capitano: A Swedish Requiem directed by Jan Troell was presented with the award for Best Film.

== Winner and nominees ==
=== Awards ===
Winners are listed first and highlighted in boldface.

**Best Film**: **Il Capitano: A Swedish Requiem**; Agnes Cecilia – en sällsam historia; Underground Secrets	**Best Director**: **Anders Grönros – Agnes Cecilia – en sällsam historia**; Susanne Bier – Freud Leaving Home; Clas Lindberg – Underground Secrets
**Best Actress in a leading role**: **Gunilla Röör – Freud Leaving Home**; Ghita Nørby – Freud Leaving Home; Gloria Tapia – Agnes Cecilia – en sällsam historia	**Best Actor in a leading role**: **Lasse Åberg – Den ofrivillige golfaren**; Antti Reini – Il Capitano: A Swedish Requiem; Rolf Lassgård – Önskas
**Best Screenplay**: **Clas Lindberg – Underground Secrets**; Marianne Goldman – Freud Leaving Home; Per Olov Enquist – Il Capitano: A Swedish Requiem	**Best Cinematography**: **Per Källberg – Agnes Cecilia – en sällsam historia**; Sven Nykvist – The Ox; Jan Troell – Il Capitano: A Swedish Requiem
**Best Foreign Film**: **Monsieur Hire (France)**; The Double Life of Véronique (France, Poland); The Fisher King (United States)	**Creative Achievement**: **Jan Gissberg**; **Leif Furhammar**
**The Ingmar Bergman Award**: **Georg af Klercker**; **Inga Adolfsson**
