= Schuyler Fisk =

American actress and singer-songwriter

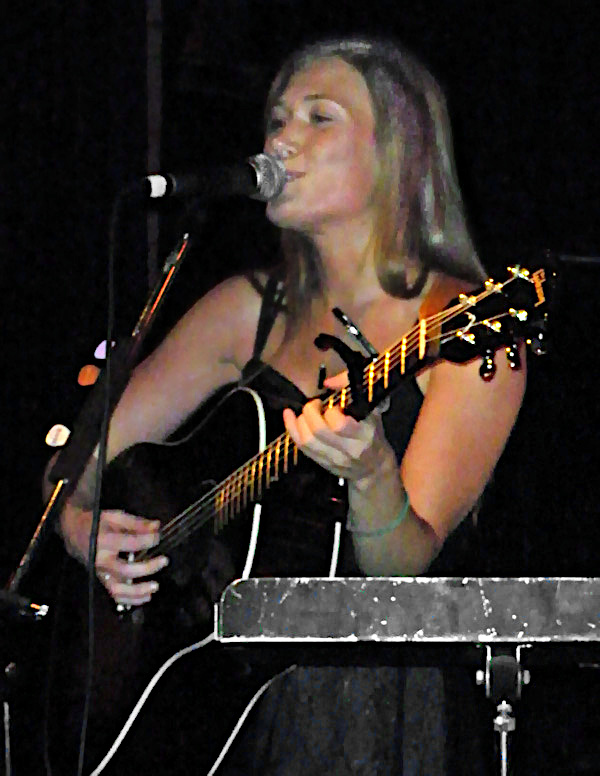
- Fisk performing at the Record Bar in Kansas City, Missouri, in February 2009
- Born: Schuyler Elizabeth Fisk; July 8, 1982 (age 44); Los Angeles, California, U.S.
- Education: University of Virginia (2006)
- Occupations: Actress, singer-songwriter
- Years active: 1990–present
- Parent(s): Jack Fisk; Sissy Spacek

Schuyler Elizabeth Fisk (pronounced /ˈskaɪlər/ SKY-lər; born July 8, 1982) is an American actress and singer-songwriter.

== Early life and education ==
Fisk was born on July 8, 1982, in Los Angeles to actress Sissy Spacek and production designer Jack Fisk.

Fisk began acting in school plays as a child and progressed to acting in film roles. Her first part was playing a bumblebee in a community theatre production of Charlotte's Web. In sixth grade she had her first lead role playing the title character in Annie. She studied visual arts at the College of Arts & Sciences at the University of Virginia; she graduated from there and was signed to Universal Records before leaving the label in 2008.

== Career ==
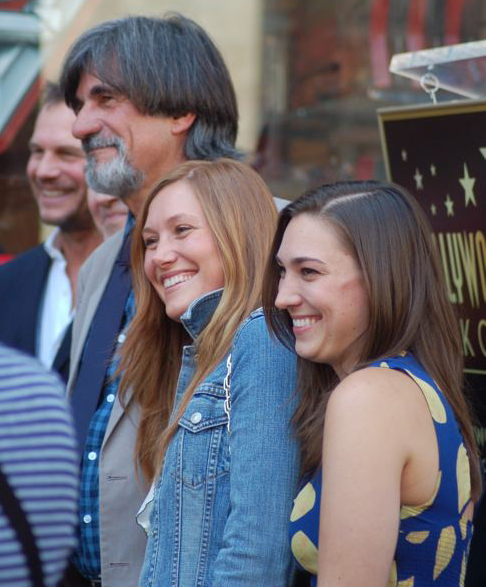
Fisk with Jack and Madison Fisk at a ceremony for Sissy Spacek to receive a star on the Hollywood Walk of Fame in August 2011

=== Acting ===
Fisk had her film breakthrough in 1995 as Kristy Thomas in The Baby-Sitters Club. Her next appearance was in the 2000 comedy Snow Day as Lane Leonard. She is likely most well known for her supporting role as Ashley in the 2002 teen comedy Orange County; starring with Colin Hanks and Jack Black. Her notable TV appearances include an appearance on One Tree Hill as Daytona in the 2005 episode "I'm Wide Awake, It's Morning", and an appearance on Law & Order: Special Victims Unit as Ella Christiansen in the 2006 episode "Taboo." She played the overbearing and protective sister in the 2011 film Restless. She also starred in The Best of Me in 2014.

=== Music ===
==== Solo career ====
Fisk plays the guitar; she learned to play guitar from her mother and sang in various musicals as a child. She began writing and playing her own songs at age 15 and, in 2004, signed with Universal Records. In 2006, she put her acting career on hold in favor of honing her skills as a musician and recorded a demo with Joshua Radin, with whom she toured for two years. In early 2006 the duo wrote a song entitled "Paperweight." Radin introduced Fisk to Zach Braff, who in turn used the duet on the soundtrack of his film The Last Kiss; the song was also included on the Dear John soundtrack. Various projects followed, including the song "I Just Remember Goodbye" for the film Gray Matters starring Tom Cavanagh, Heather Graham, and Bridget Moynahan, as well as "Waking Life" for the film Penelope starring Christina Ricci.

In 2008, Fisk left Universal amicably. Plans to release an EP were scrapped in favor of releasing a full-length album, which was released digitally on January 27, 2009, as a download at several online retailers. As of the week of February 4, 2009, Fisk's debut album The Good Stuff, climbed to No. 1 on the iTunes Folk Charts. On Amazon, Fisk's album ranked No. 17 on the Folk chart in MP3 albums. The album was well received by various media outlets including the New York Times. She then toured with Ben Taylor.

On March 1, 2011, Fisk released her second album, Blue Ribbon Winner (through her label Cassidy Barks), then toured with the band Harper Blynn (they collaborated with her on the title track of the album). In November 2011, Fisk released a Christmas EP titled Sounds of the Holiday on iTunes and Amazon. Tracks included holiday standards such as "Have Yourself a Merry Little Christmas," "Rockin' Around the Christmas Tree," and "Silver Bells," as well as original Christmas music. Fisk's band FM Radio debuted an album titled Out of the Blue in April 2012.

==== Me and My Brother ====
Fisk, singer-songwriter Carl Anderson, and Sons of Bill touring members Sam Wilson formed The Restless Hearts. After an initial tour, the band changed their name to Me and My Brother. Their first single was called "Restless Heart".

== Other pursuits ==
She graduated from the College of Arts & Sciences at the University of Virginia in 2006.

== Filmography ==
=== Film ===
| Year | Title | Role | Notes |
|---|---|---|---|
| 1990 | Daddy's Dyin': Who's Got the Will? | Little Sara Lee Turnover | |
| 1990 | The Long Walk Home | Judy | |
| 1991 | Hard Promises | Mary | |
| 1994 | Trading Mom | Suzy | |
| 1995 | The Baby-Sitters Club | Kristy Thomas | |
| 1996 | My Friend Joe | Joe | |
| 2000 | Snow Day | Lane Leonard | |
| 2001 | Skeletons in the Closet | Robin | Direct-to-video film |
| 2002 | Orange County | Ashley | |
| 2005 | American Gun | Cicily | |
| 2006 | I'm Reed Fish | Jill | |
| 2011 | Restless | Elizabeth Cotton | |
| 2014 | The Best of Me | April | |
| 2016 | Hot Air | Summer | |
| 2017 | The Nanny | Anna | |
| 2018 | A Holiday Wish Come True | Tracie | |
| 2022 | Sam & Kate | Kate | |

=== Television ===
| Year | Title | Role | Notes |
|---|---|---|---|
| 1999 | Figure It Out | Herself/Panelist | One episode |
| 2000 | Double Dare 2000 | Herself | Episode: "Snow Day vs. The Amanda Show" |
| 2005 | One Tree Hill | Daytona Green | Episode: "I'm Wide Awake, It's Morning" |
| 2006 | Law & Order: Special Victims Unit | Ella Christiansen | Episode: "Taboo" |
| 2016 | Fear the Walking Dead | Jessica Stowe | Episode: "Do Not Disturb" |
| 2018 | Castle Rock | Young Ruth Deaver | Recurring role (season 1) |
| 2018 | Every Other Holiday | Tracie | Television film (Lifetime) |
| 2024 | The Chicken Sisters | Amanda Moore-Hillier | Series regular |

== Discography ==
=== Studio albums ===
- The Good Stuff (2009)
- Blue Ribbon Winner (2011)

=== Live album ===
- We Could Be Alright (2022)

=== EPs ===
- Songs for Now (2006)
- One World. Be Kind. (2008)
- Sounds of the Holiday (2011)

=== Singles ===
- "Love Somebody." (2009)
- "Eastside" (2021)

=== Soundtracks ===
- "Skeletons in the Closet" ("Catching up with Yesterday") (2000)
- "Snow Day" ("It's Not Her") (2000)
- "American Gun" ("The Good Stuff") (2005)
- "I'm Reed Fish" ("From Where I'm Standing", "On Your Arm") (2006)
- "Penelope" ("Waking Life") (2006)
- "Gray Matters" ("I Just Remember Goodbye") (2006)
- "Dear John" ("Paperweight") (2010)
- Life Unexpected (TV series)

- Bride Unbridled (2010) (writer: "Fall Apart Today" – uncredited / performer: "Fall Apart Today" – uncredited)

- Ugly Betty (TV series)

- The Past Presents the Future (2010) (writer: "Be My Only" – uncredited / performer: "Be My Only" – uncredited)

- "House" (TV series – Season 8 EP 8) ("Waking Life") (2011)
- AppleBox (short) ("15 Miles Ago") (2011)

== Awards and nominations ==
| Year | Event | Award | Category | Movie | Result |
|---|---|---|---|---|---|
| 1998 | 16th Ale Kino! International; Young Audience Film Festival | Poznań Goats | Best Foreign Child Actor or Actress | My Friend Joe | Won |
