= Cross-dressing in music and opera =

Element of music performance

Cross-dressing in music and opera refers to musical performers or opera singers portraying a character of the opposite gender. It is parallel to cross-dressing in film and television and draws on a long history of cross-gender acting.

== In opera ==
An entire cross-dressing genre of operatic roles, called "breeches roles" (aka trouser or pants roles) or travesti. These are male roles performed by women, typically mezzo-sopranos but occasionally by sopranos. Some female opera singers specialize in these types of roles.

One artistic reason for breeches roles was that some storylines included young boy characters, but the actual performance required an adult's vocal strength and stage experience in addition to a high, boyish voice. Women were thus better suited to these roles than actual boys. Some examples of these roles are Cherubino in The Marriage of Figaro, Siebel in Faust, and Hansel in Hansel and Gretel. Other breeches roles were created due to the need for an adult male character to seem other-worldly (Orpheus in Orfeo ed Euridice) or unmanly (Prince Idamante in Idomeneo). In some cases, the casting of a woman may have been an excuse to have an attractive actress appear in tight-fitting trousers. During the Grand Opera era, women typically worn voluminous dresses onstage. Some male operatic roles originally written to be sung in the voice range of castrati (men castrated in boyhood, whose voices never descended into the normal male register) are now usually cast with female singers in male costume.

Beethoven's only opera, Fidelio, is unusual in that it features a female character who cross-dresses as part of the plot. The woman disguises herself as a young man as part of a plan to rescue her husband from prison. In The Marriage of Figaro, Cherubino dresses as a girl to avoid army duty. The part of Cherubino is thus played by a woman, who plays a man who dresses as a woman.

In the early 20th century, German composer Richard Strauss included a major trouser role in two operas: the Composer in Ariadne auf Naxos and Octavian in Der Rosenkavalier.

== In modern music ==
- David Bowie
- Boy George
- Peter Gabriel in the early 70s, while being lead singer in Genesis, used to wear his wife's red dress during the performance of their song '"The Musical Box"', until he changed his costume for 'the old Henry' mask.
- "Arnold Layne", the first released single by British psychedelic rock group Pink Floyd, is about a transvestite who steals women's clothes from washing lines. (The song was written by Syd Barrett who supposedly cross-dressed at a later point in his life when going through a mental breakdown.)
- Nicky Wire, bassist of the Manic Street Preachers, has cross dressed throughout his career.
- The Kinks' 1970 hit "Lola" is a song about an encounter with a transvestite.
- Pete Burns, the lead singer of the new wave band Dead or Alive, cross-dressed in the band's music videos, performances, and in his appearances on TV. However, Burns is dismissive of the term "cross-dressing" to describe his style, as said in numerous television interviews and in his autobiography.
- Actor and singer Harris Glenn Milstead became known for his drag persona, Divine.
- Prince, in his early career made androgynous fashion choices; he wore high-heeled shoes.
- Marilyn Manson often wears androgynous costumes in their performances, music videos and public appearances.
- Maynard James Keenan of the band Tool cross-dressed during performances in the late 1990s as part of his stage act.
- Kurt Cobain, the lead singer of the American grunge band Nirvana, often cross-dressed at home and on stage.
- Billie Joe Armstrong of Green Day wrote a song about cross-dressing called "King for a Day", which was featured in the band's 1997 album nimrod..
- Brian Viglione, member of the punk cabaret group The Dresden Dolls, has cross-dressed since he was 12 years old.
- The Who's song "I'm a Boy" is about a young boy dressed as a girl.
- The Bitch and Animal song "Drag King Bar" is about cross-dressing.
- "Be My Human Tonight" by Norman Iceberg also talks about the concept.
- Frank Zappa and the Mothers of Invention wore dresses for the covers and center art of their third album We're Only in It for the Money
- Queen cross-dressed in their video for the song, "I Want to Break Free".
- Annie Lennox is seen dressed in a suit, tie, gloves, and cane in the music video for "Sweet Dreams (Are Made of This)".
- The rock band Twisted Sister often dresses cross dressed on stages and photo shoots.
- Philo Cramer from the band Fear wore a green dress when they infamously appeared on Saturday Night Live
- Red Hot Chili Peppers frontman Anthony Kiedis has been known to crossdress on stage and, occasionally, in videos.
- AC/DC's former singer Bon Scott dressed once as a school girl (as an opposite to Angus Young)
- Placebo's frontman Brian Molko is androgynous and bisexual, often cross-dressing on and offstage.
  - Placebo's song Nancy Boy is about a sensitive boy who "Does his makeup in his room" and dresses like a girl.
- IAMX (also Chris Corner) cross-dresses in his video for My Secret Friend along with Imogen Heap.
- Verka Serduchka, Ukrainian male singer who always performs as a female.
- Jeffree Star, male singer and Myspace celebrity, is almost always wearing women's clothes.
- In Japan, visual kei musicians often appear crossdressing such as Hizaki and Jasmine You (both from Versailles), Kaya (vocalist of Schwarz Stein), Bou (ex-guitarist of An Cafe), Yumehito (guitarist of Ayabie), Tatsuhi (bassist of Zoro) and Aya (Guitarist of Psycho le Cému). In addition to his musical career, Mana, from the bands Malice Mizer and Moi dix Mois, is a fashion designer who often cross-dresses.
- Lou Reed wrote songs about / including "T.V.'s", with the earliest example being "Sister Ray" from the Velvet Underground's 1968 album White Light/White Heat, and followed by Reed's solo album hit, the infamous "Walk on the Wild Side" from the Bowie-produced 1972 album Transformer. This song was in reference to the T.V.'s who were a part of the Andy Warhol entourage: "Sugar Plum Fairy", "Candy Darling", and "Jackie 'O'".
- U2 wore dresses on the Achtung Baby sleeve notes.
- Led Zeppelin also dressed in drag in one of the pics on Physical Graffiti, they also hung out with drag queens.
- Steven Tyler of Aerosmith is a known crossdresser. Aerosmith's song "Dude Looks Like A Lady" is about stumbling upon a transvestite
- New York Dolls donned an androgynous wardrobe, wearing disheveled wigs, smudged lipstick, stilted platforms, painfully tight lurex/satin pants and crimpoline dresses.
- Richie Stotts wore tutus and a naughty nurse costume during his stint in The Plasmatics, in order to keep up with the outrageousness of bandmate Wendy O. Williams
- Davey Faragher wore dresses on stage during his stint in Cracker. When the band performed on Late Night with David Letterman, David Letterman made a joke about it.

== See also ==
- Cross-dressing in literature
