= I Miss You (2011 film) =

2011 film directed by Anders Grönros

I Miss You (Swedish: Jag saknar dig) is a Swedish drama film directed by Anders Grönros and based on the 1992 young adult novel I Miss You, I Miss You! by Kinna Gieth and Peter Pohl. The film was released in 2011.

It was seen by 96,926 Swedish cinemagoers in 2011 and thus became the tenth most watched Swedish film that year.

== Premise ==
The film is about Tina and Cilla, two teenage twins who live with their mother and father in a small town near Piteå. Tina goes to parties and dates guys while Cilla devotes her time to theater. One morning when they are about to run to the school bus, on their mother's birthday, Cilla is hit by a car driven by their friend Martin. The film focuses on the everyday life of a girl who has lost her twin sister, and how Martin copes with his guilt.

== Cast ==
- Erica Midfjäll – Tina
- Hanna Midfjäll – Cilla
- Birthe Wingren – Katja
- Thomas Hanzon – Albert
- Ludvig Nilsson – Ailu
- Alva From – Sandra
- Agnes Blåsjö – Frida
- Einar Bredefeldt – Fredde
- Mikael Ersson – Martin
- Tom Ljungman – Stefan
- Ola Rapace – kuratorn George
- Basia Frydman – farmor
- Måns Herngren – director
- Filip Tallhamn – music producer
- Olivia Flodin – Lisa
- Erland Löfgren – Tobbe
- Anders Hedberg – man
- Monica Goossens – nurse
- Kristian Täljeblad – Kristian
- André Eriksson – André
- Mikael Odhag – teacher
- Maja Stenvall – Maja
- Sanna Eriksson – Sanna
