= Coro (singer) =

- Born: New York City
- Origin: New York City
- Genres: Freestyle
- Occupation: Singer
- Instrument: Vocals
- Label: Cutting Records

Coro (born in New York City) is an American Latin freestyle singer of Cuban and Dominican heritage, who first had roles in numerous episodes of the star's hit television series, Miami Vice. While appearing on Vice, (Jose) Coro struggled to put together a group to get his singing career off the ground. His first efforts never took off, but in 1987, Coro met Stevie B, who was enjoying the success of his first hit record and getting ready to tour. After a stint as a backup vocalist and dancer for Stevie B, the New York-born and Miami-raised Coro made the move back to his native Manhattan to initiate a solo singing career.

Coro partnered with freestyle music producers Zahid Tariq, Ziggy Gonzalez and Todd Terry in 1989,. Coro's first single, "Where Are You Tonight", became a popular dance song in New York and Miami. The song reached the Top 25 on Billboard 's club chart and put Coro on the road doing shows in dance clubs across the country. On his self-titled debut album, Coro collaborated with producers Zahid Tariq and Ziggy Gonzalez to create a selection of uptempo dance tunes like "Can't Let You Go", "Where Are You tonight", "My Fallen Angel" and ballads such as "Missing You".

== Discography ==
=== Studio album ===
Year	Album details	Record chart
Year	Album details	U.S. Heat (Northeast)
1991	Coro: Released: March 5, 1991; Label: Cutting Records / Charisma	10

=== Singles ===
Year	Single	Positions		Album
Year	Single	US	US Dance Sales	Album
1989	"Where Are You Tonight"	—	25	Coro
1990	"Can't Let You Go"	—	18	Coro
1991	"My Fallen Angel"	54	25	Coro
1991	"Where Are You Tonight '91"	—	—	Coro
1991	"Missing You"	—	—	Coro
1993	"Stand by Your Lover"	—	—	Cutting Records Dance Vault
1994	"One Night with You"	—	—	Only single
1996	"Do Unto Me"	—	—	Only single
1998	"Shadows"	—	—	Only single
2010	"Sexy Lady"	—	—	Only single
"—" denotes a release that did not make the stop.

=== Video clips ===
Year	Title	Director (s)
1991	"My Fallen Angel"	–
