= I Miss You, I Miss You! =

1992 novel by Peter Pohl and Kinna Gieth

- First edition
- Author: Kinna Gieth & Peter Pohl
- Original title: Jag saknar dig, jag saknar dig!
- Language: Swedish
- Subject: children and death
- Genre: children
- Published: 1992
- Publisher: Rabén & Sjögren
- Publication place: Sweden
- Awards: August Prize of 1992

I Miss You, I Miss You! (Swedish: Jag saknar dig, jag saknar dig!) is a novel by Swedish author Peter Pohl and Kinna Gieth (1992).

== Plot summary ==
Cilla and Tina are thirteen years old and identical twin sisters. As they hurry to catch the bus to school one day, Cilla is run over by a car and killed. Left behind is Tina, who now has to find her balance in life without her sister. The book follows the sisters during the months leading up to Cilla's death, and Tina's first year without her.

== Back story ==
Kinna Gieth and her twin sister Jenny read Peter Pohl's novel Alltid den där Annette, in which Annette loses her twin. While reading it, Kinna and Jenny talked about how neither one of them would be able to go on living if the other died. Just weeks later Jenny died, and Kinna contacted Pohl and asked him to help her write their story. Pohl used Kinna's letters, poems written by the twins and their diaries, and conversations with Kinna to form the basis of the book.

== Movie ==
The novel was made a movie by Swedish director Anders Grönros in 2010. The film, called I Miss You (Jag saknar dig), was released in 2011.
