= Miss You =

Miss You may refer to:

== Music ==
=== Albums ===
- Miss You, by the Stranglers or the title song (see below), 2003
- Miss You, by Mr. Children, 2023
- Miss You (EP), by Gabrielle Aplin, 2016

=== Songs ===
- "Miss You" (1929 song), a 1929 song first recorded by Rudy Vallée
- "Miss You" (Aaliyah song), 2002
- "Miss You" (Feeder song), 2008
- "Miss You" (Gabrielle Aplin song), 2016
- "Miss You" (Jérémie Makiese song), 2022
- "Miss You" (Louis Tomlinson song), 2017
- "Miss You" (M-flo song), 2003
- "Miss You" (Martin Tungevaag, Sick Individuals and Marf song), 2020
- "Miss You" (Robin Schulz and Oliver Tree song), 2022
- "Miss You" (Rolling Stones song), 1978
- "Miss You" (Westlife song), 1999, covered as "I Miss You" by Basshunter (2008)
- "Miss You" (Yuna Ito song), 2008
- "Miss You", by Alabama Shakes from Sound & Color
- "Miss You", by Bang Ye-dam from Only One
- "Miss You", by Candlebox from Into the Sun
- "Miss You", by Cashmere Cat
- "Miss You", by Clinic from Free Reign
- "Miss You", by Coldrain from Nothing Lasts Forever
- "Miss You", by Conan Gray from Found Heaven
- "Miss You", by the Crows
- "Miss You", by Dream from It Was All a Dream
- "Miss You", by Enrique Iglesias from Insomniac
- "Miss You", by Foster the People from Torches
- "Miss You", by Gen Hoshino from Yellow Dancer
- "Miss You", by the Happy Fits from Lovesick
- "Miss You", by Kashmir from The Good Life
- "Miss You", by MYMP from Soulful Acoustic
- "Miss You", by Manfred Mann from Soft Vengeance
- "Miss You", by Mariah Carey from The Remixes
- "Miss You", by Mirwais Ahmadzaï
- "Miss You", by Nickelback from No Fixed Address
- "Miss You", by the Stranglers from Written in Red
- "Miss You", by Trentemøller from The Last Resort
- "Miss U", by Charli XCX from 13 Reasons Why: Season 3 (A Netflix Original Series Soundtrack)
- "Miss U", by Faze from Faze Alone
- "Miss U", by the Notorious B.I.G. from Life After Death

== See also ==
- I Miss You (disambiguation)
- Missing You (disambiguation)
- "Miss You Much", a song by Janet Jackson
