= Per Källberg =

Swedish cinematographer (1947–2014)

- Born: 14 March 1947; Stockholm, Sweden
- Died: 17 February 2014 (aged 66)
- Occupation: Cinematographer
- Years active: 1973-2011

Per Källberg (14 March 1947 – 17 February 2014) was a Swedish cinematographer. At the 27th Guldbagge Awards he won the award for Best Cinematography for the film Agnes Cecilia – en sällsam historia. He worked on more than 45 films and television shows between 1973 and 2011.

Källberg was awarded the Swedish Film Photographers' Association's Film Course of the Year Award in 1983 for the photo in the documentary Nature's Revenge and in 1991 was awarded a Golden Bug for Best Photo with the feature film Agnes Cecilia. He was also nominated for a Gold Bag for I am your warrior (1998) and Stockholm East (2011).

Per Källberg died on 17 February 2014 at the age of 66.

== Selected filmography ==
- The Man on the Roof (1976)
- A Respectable Life (1979)
- Agnes Cecilia – en sällsam historia (1991)
- Night of the Orangutan (1992)
- Sökarna: Återkomsten (2006)
