= Breeches role =

Theatre role in which an actress wears male clothing

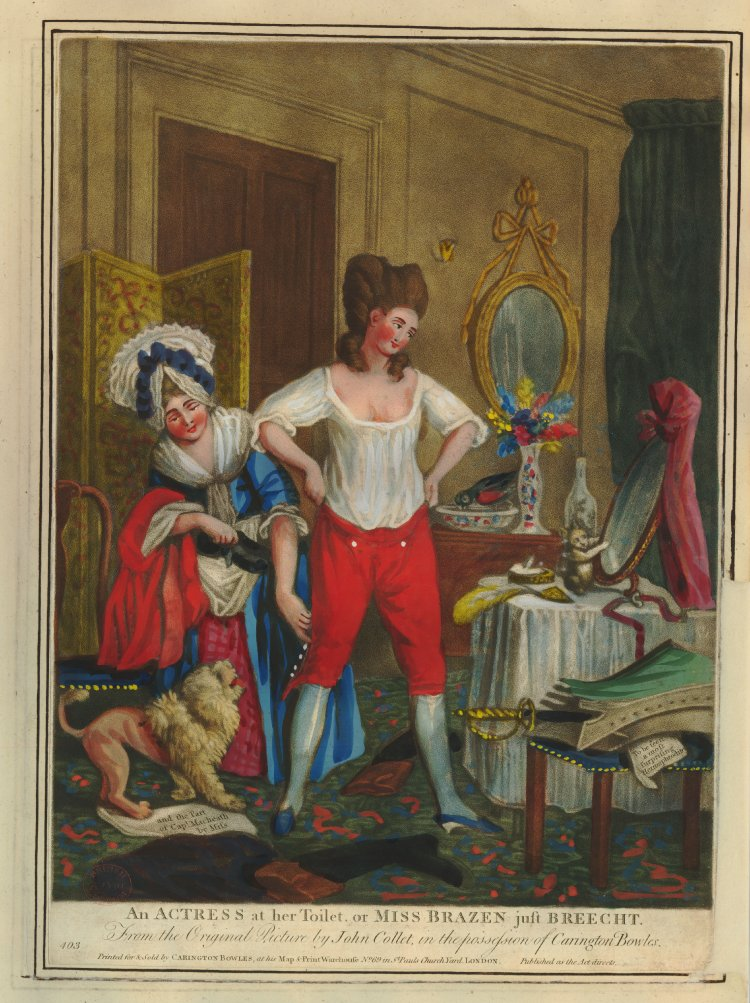
An Actress at Her Toilet, or Miss Brazen Just Breecht (John Collet, 1779)

In theater, a breeches role or breeches part (also pants role, pants part, trouser role, trouser part, and Hosenrolle) is a role in which a female actor performs in male clothing. Breeches, tight-fitting knee-length pants, were a standard male garment when these roles were introduced. The theatrical term travesti covers both this sort of cross-dressing and also male actors dressing as female characters. Both are part of the long history of cross-dressing in music and opera and later in film and television.

In opera, a breeches role refers to any male character that is sung and acted by a female singer. Most often the character is an adolescent or a very young man, sung by a mezzo-soprano or contralto. The operatic concept assumes that the character is male, and the audience accepts him as such, even knowing that the actor is not. Cross-dressing female characters (e.g., Leonore in Fidelio or Gilda in Act III of Rigoletto) are not considered breeches roles. The most frequently performed breeches roles are Cherubino (The Marriage of Figaro), Octavian (Der Rosenkavalier), Hansel (Hansel und Gretel) and Orpheus (Orfeo ed Euridice), though the latter was originally written for a male singer, first a castrato and later, in the revised French version, an haute-contre.

Because non-musical stage plays generally have no requirements for vocal range, they do not usually contain breeches roles in the same sense as opera. Some plays do have male roles that were written for adult female actors, and (for other practical reasons) are usually played by women (e.g., Peter Pan); these could be considered modern-era breeches roles. However, in most cases, the choice of a female actor to play a male character is made at the production level; Hamlet is not a breeches role, but Sarah Bernhardt once played Hamlet as a breeches role. When a play is spoken of as "containing" a breeches role, this does mean a role where a female character pretends to be a man and uses male clothing as a disguise.

== History and development ==
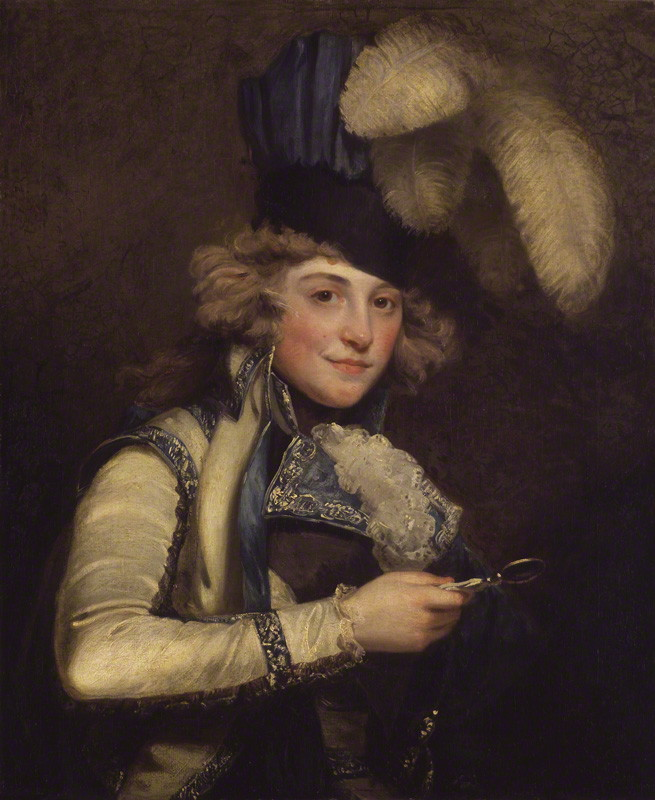
Dorothea Jordan as Hippolyta by John Hoppner, 1791

When the London theatres re-opened in the Stuart Restoration of 1660, the first professional actresses appeared on the public stage, replacing the boys in dresses of the Shakespeare era. To see real women speak the risqué dialogue of Restoration comedy and show off their bodies on stage was a great novelty, and soon the even greater sensation was introduced of women wearing male clothes on stage. Out of some 375 plays produced on the London stage between 1660 and 1700, it has been calculated that 89, nearly a quarter, contained one or more roles for actresses in male clothes (see Howe). Practically every Restoration actress appeared in trousers at some time, and breeches roles would even be inserted gratuitously in revivals of older plays.

Some critics, such as Jacqueline Pearson, have argued that these cross-dressing roles subvert conventional gender roles by allowing women to imitate the roistering and sexually aggressive behaviour of male Restoration rakes, but Elizabeth Howe has objected in a detailed study that the male disguise was "little more than yet another means of displaying the actress as a sexual object". The epilogue to Thomas Southerne's Sir Anthony Love (1690) suggests that it does not much matter if the play is dull, as long as the audience can glimpse the legs of the famous "breeches" actress Susanna Mountfort (also known as Susanna Verbruggen):

You'll hear with Patience a dull Scene, to see,
In a contented lazy waggery,
The Female Mountford bare above the knee.

Katharine Eisaman Maus also argues that as well as revealing the female legs and buttocks, the breeches role frequently contained a revelation scene where the character not only unpins her hair but as often reveals a breast as well. This is evidenced in the portraits of many of these actresses of the Restoration.

Breeches roles remained an attraction on the British stage for centuries, but their fascination gradually declined as the difference in real-life male and female clothing became less extreme. They played a part in Victorian burlesque and are traditional for the principal boy in pantomime.

== Opera ==
=== History ===
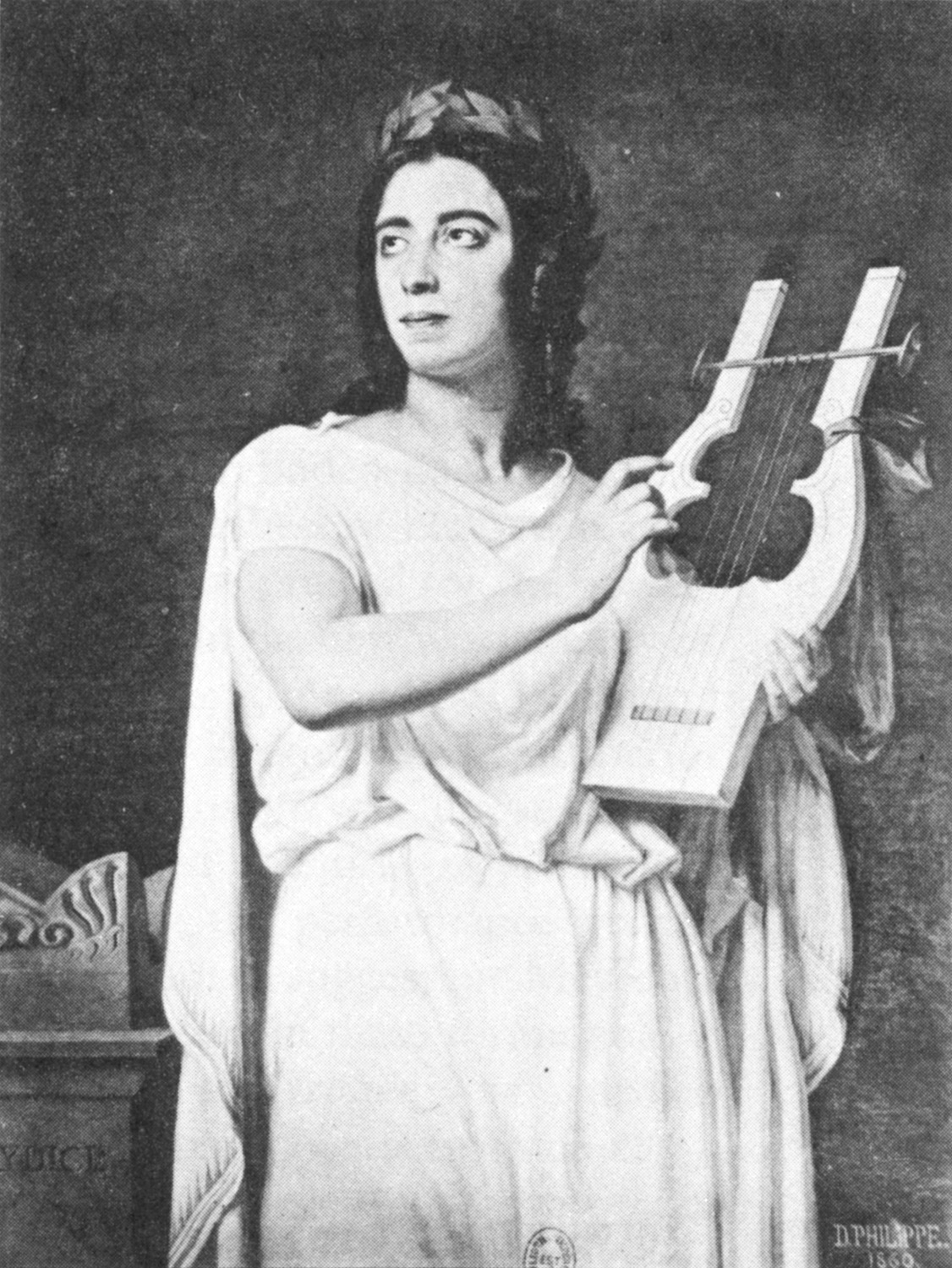
Pauline Viardot as Orphée (1860) in Gluck's opera

The classification of breeches roles has varied quite a bit depending on performance practice and audience expectations. In the Baroque era, the prevailing mindset was not at all concerned with gender alignment for stage roles. Thus, in early Italian opera, male leads—whether young lover, hero, or antagonist—were usually written for the high voices of castrati; further, it was also common to assign them to female performers of any vocal range—whenever castrati were unavailable or too expensive, or simply when the company included female performers who specialized in breeches roles (the most famous being Vittoria Tesi Tramontini). Conversely, in French opera—where castrati were not accepted—but also in seventeenth-century Italian opera, it was also common for low male voices to be entrusted with the 'skirt roles' of female deities associated with the underworld, malevolence, or war, as well as elderly, lecherous, or otherwise ridiculous women. Besides, as women were barred from performing on stage in Rome and vast areas of the Papal States until the end of the eighteenth century (a restriction virtually unknown in the rest of operatic Europe), female opera roles premiering there were originally conceived for and entrusted to castrati as 'skirt roles' (for example, Mandane and Semira in Leonardo Vinci's Artaserse; or Aristea and Argene in Giovanni Battista Pergolesi's L'olimpiade). Outside the area where the ban applied, the use of castrati in female roles never became widespread, and such roles were routinely reassigned to female singers when Roman operas were revived elsewhere.

As the use and availability of castrati began to decline toward the end of the eighteenth century, the male leads they had originally created were progressively taken over by female singers—usually contraltos—whom composers also turned to for their new operatic works, thereby contributing to what has later been known as the travesti tradition. Performers such as Marietta Alboni and Rosmunda Pisaroni became renowned for their heroic male roles, particularly in the Rossini repertoire. After the 1820s, however, the practice of the female "contralto musico" (musico being the former euphemistic term for a castrato) fell into disuse quite rapidly; the principal male roles that had once been the preserve of castrati passed on to tenors (for lovers and heroes) and baritones (for antagonists). Whereupon, travesti roles in general became a marginal category, and "breeches roles" were increasingly confined to the portrayal of pages or other youths, being usually performed by mezzo-sopranos.

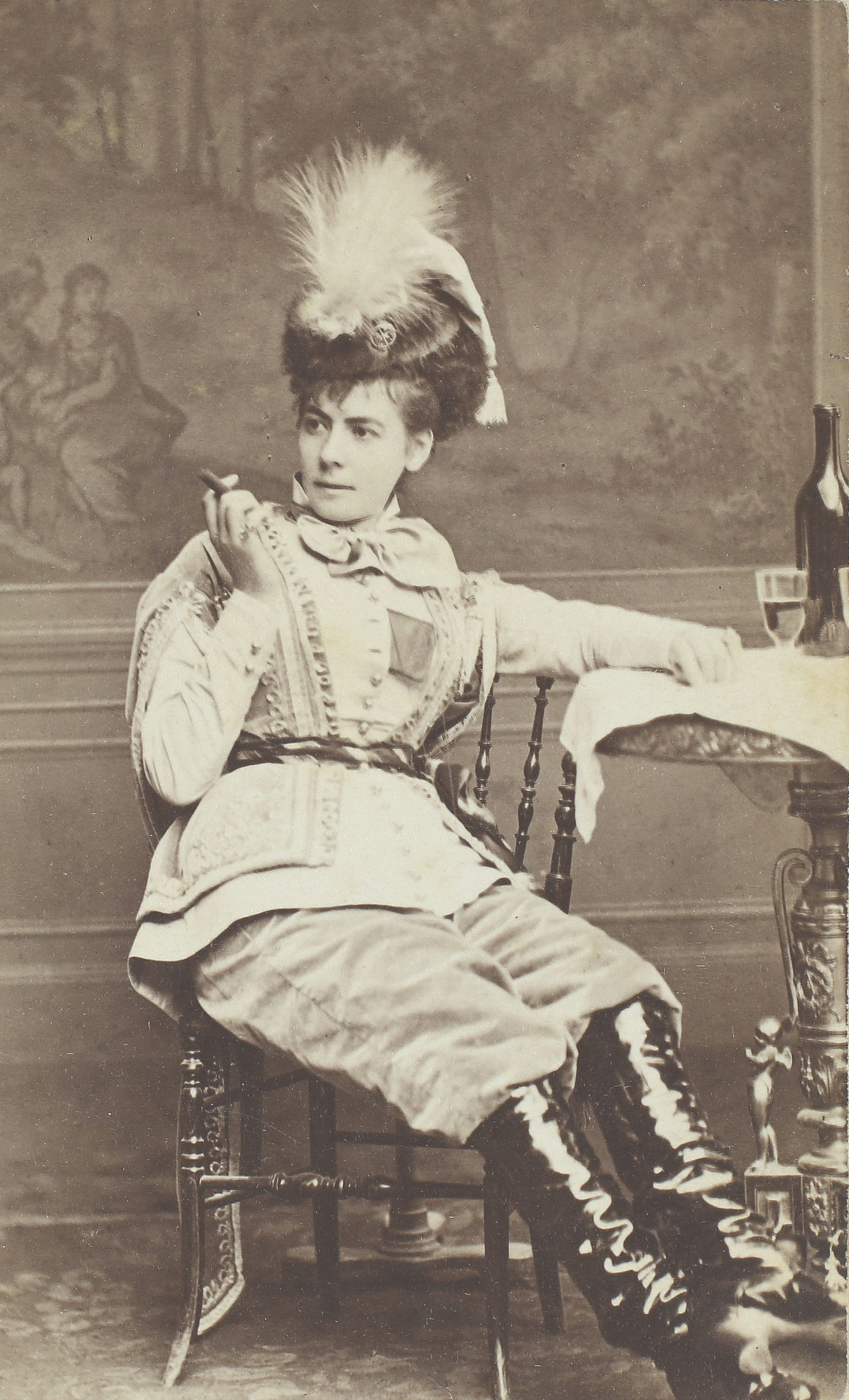
Anna Ulke as Prinz Orlofsky in "Die Fledermaus" (Vienna, 1875)

==== Terminology ====
The term travesty (from the French travesti, meaning disguised) applies to any roles sung by the opposite sex. A closely related term is a skirt role, a female character to be played by a male singer, usually for comic or visual effect. These roles are often ugly stepsisters or very old women, and are not as common as trouser roles.

=== Casting practices ===
In the modern performance of opera, these roles may be sung by female singers or countertenors depending on the production and availability of singers. For example, the role of Prince Orlofsky in Die Fledermaus is more often than not performed by a mezzo-soprano, but it is also sung by a countertenor sometimes which can change how the character is presented on stage. The breeches role remain a central part of the mezzo-soprano repertoire in modern opera, which reflects both historical vocal traditions and more modern, practical casting considerations.

==== Dramatic function ====
Breeches roles often serve specific dramatic purposes within opera, such as the portrayal of young male characters and the use of cross-gender casting for expressive or comic effect. Scholars have noted that these roles frequently emphasize youth, emotional openness, and physical expressivity in performance. The Madwoman in Britten's Curlew River and the Cook in Prokofiev's The Love for Three Oranges are later examples. The role of the witch in Humperdinck's Hänsel und Gretel, although written for a mezzo-soprano, is now sometimes sung by a tenor, who sings the part an octave lower. In the same opera the "male" roles of Hänsel, the Sandman, and the Dewman are however meant to be sung by women.

The examples below reflect a broader tradition of breeches roles across the operatic repertoire.

=== Roles in opera ===
- Adès's The Tempest: "Ariel" is sung by a soprano

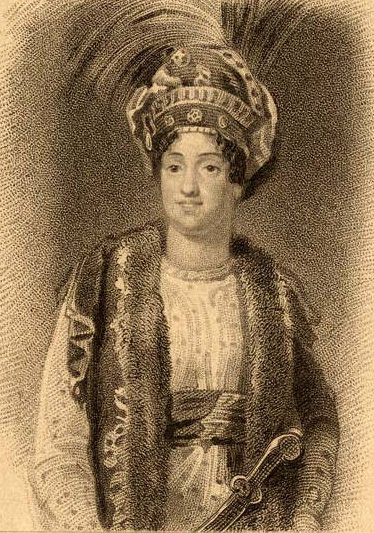
Madame Vestris as Artaxerses in Arne's opera of the same title

- Arne's Artaxerxes: "Arbaces" is sung by a mezzo-soprano
- Bellini's Bianca e Fernando: "Viscardo" is sung by a mezzo-soprano
- Bellini's Zaira: "Nerestano" is sung by a mezzo-soprano
- Bellini's I Capuleti e i Montecchi: "Romeo" is sung by a mezzo-soprano
- Berg's Lulu: "Der Gymnasiast" (a schoolboy) is sung by a contralto
- Berlioz's Benvenuto Cellini: "Ascanio" is sung by a mezzo-soprano
- Berlioz's Les Troyens: "Ascagne" is sung by a soprano
- Catalani's La Wally: "Walter" is sung by a soprano
- Chabrier's L'étoile: "Lazuli" the peddler is sung by a soprano
- Chabrier's Une éducation manquée: "Gontran de Boismassif" is sung by a soprano
- Charpentier's David et Jonathas: "Jonathas" is sung by a soprano; La Pythonisse is sung by an haute-contre, which is a high-pitched male voice, similar to a countertenor.
- Corigliano's The Ghosts of Versailles: "Cherubino" (a recreation of the same character from Le nozze di Figaro) is sung by a mezzo-soprano
- Donizetti's Alahor in Granata: "Muley-Hassem" is sung by a contralto
- Donizetti's Anna Bolena: "Smeton" is sung by a mezzo-soprano
- Donizetti's Lucrezia Borgia: "Maffio Orsini" is sung by a contralto
- Dvořák's Rusalka: "The Kitchen Boy" is sung by a soprano
- Glinka's A Life for the Tsar: "Vanya" is sung by a contralto
- Glinka's Ruslan and Lyudmila: "Ratmir", a Khazar prince, is sung by a contralto
- Gluck's Orfeo ed Euridice: Originally written for a castrato, "Orfeo" (Orphée in the 1774 French version) is sung by a mezzo-soprano, contralto or countertenor
- Gluck's Paride ed Elena: Originally written for a castrato, "Paride" is sung by a soprano
- Gounod's Faust: "Siebel" is sung by a contralto, a mezzo-soprano or a soprano
- Gounod's Romeo and Juliet: "Stefano" is sung by a soprano
- Hahn's Mozart: The title is sung by a soprano
- Händel's Alcina: "Ruggiero" is sung by a mezzo-soprano
- Händel's Ariodante: The role of "Ariodante" was premiered by a soprano-castrato and is performed today by a mezzo-soprano; "Lurcanio" was originally written for contralto, but later rewritten by Handel for tenor. In modern performances it is generally left to the director to decide whether to use contralto (or countertenor) or a lyric tenor.
- Händel's Giulio Cesare: "Julius Caesar" was originally written for an alto-castrato and is today sung by a mezzo-soprano or countertenor; "Sesto" is sung by a soprano
- Händel's Rinaldo: the title role "Rinaldo", sung at its premiere by a castrato, is currently sung by a mezzo-soprano or a countertenor
- Händel's Xerxes: the title role "Xerxes", sung at its premiere by a castrato, is currently sung by a mezzo-soprano or a countertenor
- Haydn's La canterina: The role of "Don Ettore" is sung by a soprano and the role of "Apollonia" is sung by a tenor
- Haydn's Lo speziale: The role of "Volpino" is sung by a soprano

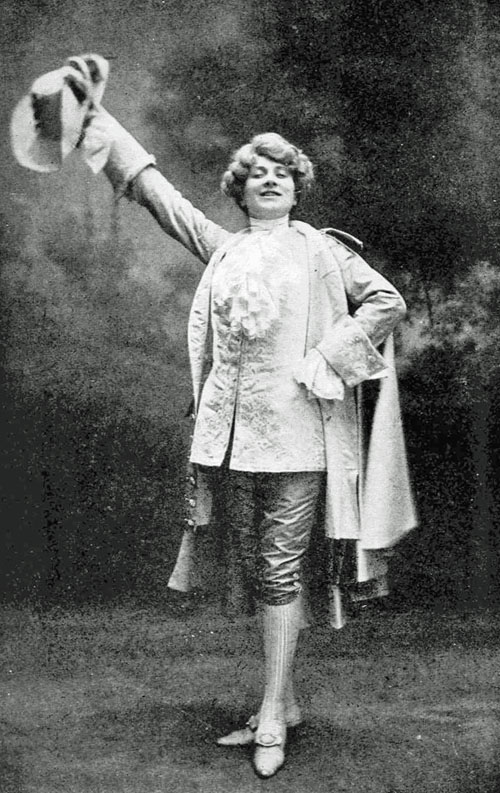
Mary Garden as Chérubin, Opéra-Comique, 1905

- Lecocq's Le petit duc: the title role is sung by a soprano
- Humperdinck's Hänsel und Gretel: "Hänsel" is sung by a mezzo-soprano; The Sand-Man and The Dew-Man sung by sopranos; The Witch often sung by a tenor
- Janáček's From the House of the Dead: Aljeja, a young Tartar is sung by a mezzo-soprano
- Massenet's Cendrillon: the role of "Le Prince Charmant" was written for a soprano (in some performances the role is taken by a tenor)
- Massenet's Chérubin: The title role is sung by a soprano
- Meyerbeer's Les Huguenots : "Urbain" the page is sung by a mezzo-soprano
- Monteverdi's L'incoronazione di Poppea: "Nero" is sung by a soprano (today the role is often sung by a male tenor or contratenor)
- Mozart's Le nozze di Figaro: "Cherubino" is sung by a mezzo-soprano
- Mozart's La clemenza di Tito : "Annio" is sung by soprano; "Sesto" was originally written for a castrato and is performed today by a mezzo-soprano
- Mozart's Idomeneo: "Idamante" is sung by a mezzo-soprano
- Mozart's Il re pastore: "Aminta" was originally written for soprano-castrato, and in modern performances is sung by a lyric soprano
- Mozart's Lucio Silla: "Cecilio" and "Lucio Cinna" are sung by sopranos
- Mozart's Ascanio in Alba: "Ascanio" and "Fauno" are sung by sopranos
- Mozart's Mitridate, re di Ponto: "Farnace" is sung by a mezzo-soprano or contralto, and "Sifare" and "Arbate" are sung by sopranos. However, "Farnace" is commonly done by a countertenor.
- Mozart's La finta giardiniera: "Ramiro" is sung by a mezzo-soprano

Thérèse Björklund as Nicklaus in The Tales of Hoffmann, Stockholm, 1907

- Offenbach's Mesdames de la Halle: Croûte-au-pot (the kitchen boy) is sung by a soprano; Madame Poiretapée, Madame Madou, and Madame Beurrefondu are sung by a tenor and two baritones
- Offenbach's Geneviève de Brabant: "Drogan" the young baker is sung by a soprano
- Offenbach's Daphnis et Chloé: "Daphnis" is sung by a mezzo-soprano
- Offenbach's Le pont des soupirs: The page "Amoroso" is sung by a mezzo-soprano
- Offenbach's Les bavards: The young poet "Roland" is sung by a contralto
- Offenbach's La belle Hélène: "Oreste" is sung by a mezzo-soprano
- Offenbach's Robinson Crusoé: "Friday" is sung by a mezzo-soprano
- Offenbach's Les brigands: The farmer "Fragoletto" is sung by a mezzo-soprano
- Offenbach's La jolie parfumeuse: The young clerk "Bavolet" is sung by a soprano
- Offenbach's Madame l'archiduc: "Fortunato, captain of the archduke's dragoons" is sung by a mezzo-soprano
- Offenbach's Le voyage dans la lune: "Prince Caprice" is sung by a mezzo-soprano
- Offenbach's The Tales of Hoffmann: "Nicklausse" is sung by a mezzo-soprano
- Offenbach's Orphée aux enfers: "Cupidon" (Cupid) is sung by a soprano
- Pfitzner's Palestrina: Ighino is sung by a soprano; Silla by a mezzo-soprano
- Ravel's L'enfant et les sortilèges: the title role, a young boy, is written for a mezzo-soprano; the Shepherd is sung by a mezzo-soprano
- Rimsky-Korsakov's The Snow Maiden: Lel is sung by contralto
- Rossini's Tancredi: "Tancredi" and "Roggiero" are sung by mezzo-sopranos or contraltos
- Rossini's Bianca e Falliero: "Falliero" is sung by a mezzo-soprano
- Rossini's La donna del lago: "Malcolm" is sung by a contralto
- Rossini's Le comte Ory : "Isolier" is sung by a mezzo-soprano

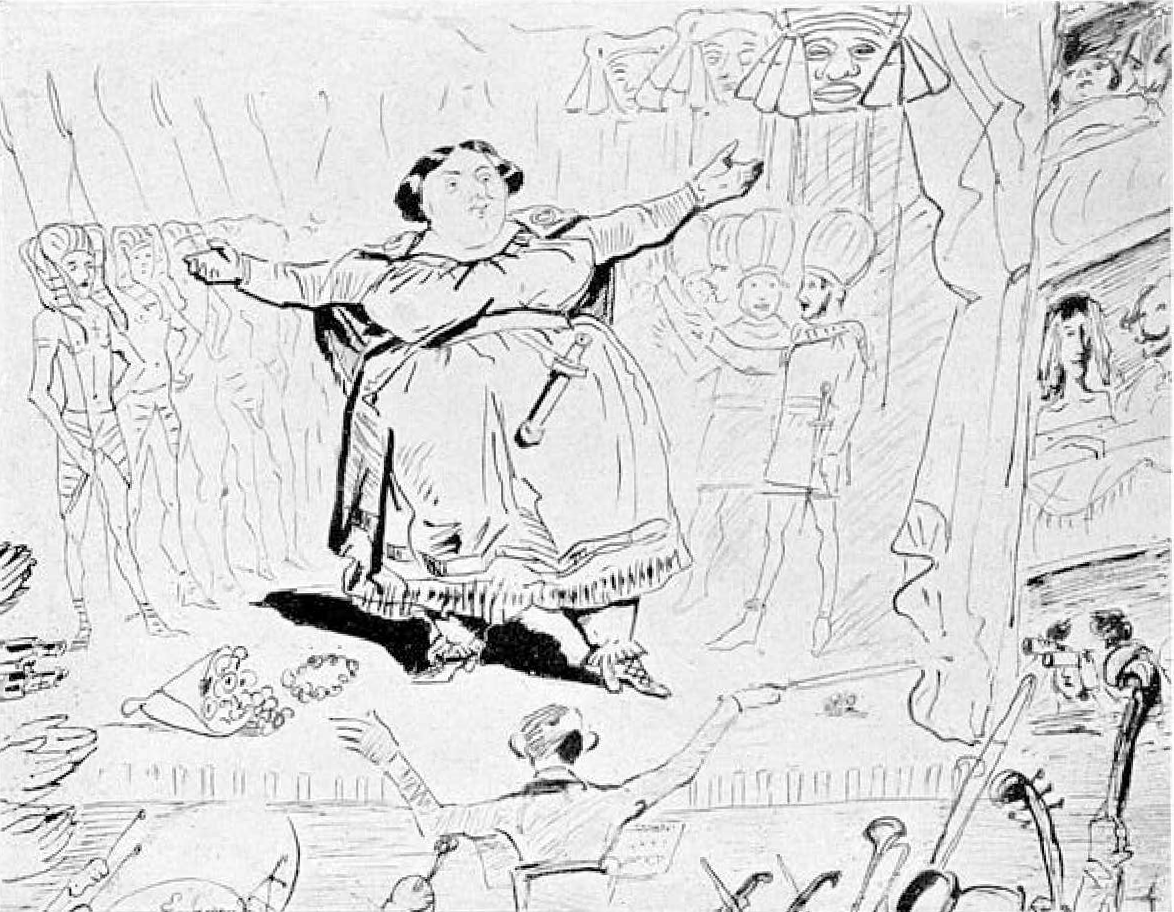
Caricature of Marietta Alboni as Arsace in Rossini's Semiramide

- Rossini's Semiramide: "Arsace" is sung by a mezzo-soprano
- Rossini's Otello: the title role was written for a tenor, but also was sung by mezzo-soprano Maria Malibran
- Rossini's Guillaume Tell: Tell's son Jemmy is sung by a soprano
- Gil Shohat's The Child Dreams: "The Child" is sung by a soprano; "The Crippled Youth" (i.e. The Poet) by a mezzo-soprano
- Kaija Saariaho's L'Amour de loin: "The Pilgrim" is sung by a mezzo-soprano
- Johann Strauss II's Die Fledermaus: "Prince Orlofsky" is sung by a mezzo-soprano (almost always)
- Richard Strauss's Salome: "The Page of Herodias" is sung by a contralto
- Richard Strauss's Ariadne auf Naxos: "The Composer" is sung by a mezzo-soprano
- Richard Strauss's Der Rosenkavalier: "Octavian" is sung by a mezzo-soprano
- Tchaikovsky's The Queen of Spades: Milovzor is sung by contralto
- Verdi's Un ballo in maschera: "Oscar", Gustavus III's page, is sung by a soprano
- Verdi's Don Carlos: The page Thibault (Tebaldo) is sung by a soprano
- Wagner's Rienzi: "Adriano" is sung by a mezzo-soprano
- Wagner's Tannhäuser: The Young Shepherd is sung by a soprano
- Wagner's Parsifal: Two novices in the all-male society of Knights of the Grail are sung by sopranos
- Wagner's Die Meistersinger von Nürnberg: Several apprentices are sung by women
- Weber's Oberon: "Puck" is sung by a mezzo-soprano

== See also ==
- Breeching (boys)
- Principal boy
- Travesti (theatre)
- Otokoyaku
- History of cross-dressing
