= Percy Brandt =

Swedish actor (1922–2005)

- Born: 7 November 1922; Lahore, British India (now Pakistan)
- Died: 4 December 2005 (aged 83); Gothenburg, Västra Götalands län, Sweden
- Occupation: Actor
- Years active: 1950–1994
- Spouse: Else-Marie Brandt
- Children: 4

Percy Brandt (7 November 1922 – 4 December 2005) was a Swedish film and television actor.

Brandt was born in Lahore, Punjab, Pakistan. His father, Erik Brandt, was a Swede of German and Dutch ancestry, and his mother, Aminah Hussain, was Pakistani.

Brandt's daughter, Paula Brandt, is also an actress.
