= Coro (album) =

Studio album by Coro
- Released: March 5, 1991
- Genre: Latin freestyle
- Length: 43:54
- Label: Cutting/Charisma
- Producers: Zahid Tariq, Hector Gonzalez

Singles from Coro
- 1. "Where Are You Tonight" Released: June 23, 1989; 2. "Can't Let You Go" Released: June 11, 1990; 3. "My Fallen Angel" Released: May 13, 1991; 4. "Missing You" Released: November 21, 1991

Professional ratings
Review scores
Source	Rating
Allmusic	3/5 stars

Coro is the debut studio album by the Latin freestyle singer Coro. It was released on March 5, 1991, by Charisma Records.

== Track listing ==
No.	Title	Length
1.	"Where Are You Tonight"	4:06
2.	"Can't Let You Go"	4:14
3.	"You're Just Who I Need"	3:59
4.	"Missing You"	5:10
5.	"Promise You My Love"	5:02
6.	"No Way Out"	4:29
7.	"My Fallen Angel"	3:59
8.	"I Wanna Hold You"	3:50
9.	"We Belong Together"	5:36
10.	"Mega Beats"	3:29

== Charts ==
Singles - Billboard (North America)

Year	Single	Chart	Position
1989	"Where Are You Tonight"	Hot Dance Music/Maxi-Singles Sales	25
1990	"Can't Let You Go"	Hot Dance Music/Maxi-Singles Sales	18
1991	"My Fallen Angel"	Hot Dance Music/Maxi-Singles Sales	25
1991	"My Fallen Angel"	The Billboard Hot 100	54
