= Katie Carroll =

American singer-songwriter

- Genres: Pop; Indie folk
- Years active: 2010-present
- Labels: unsigned
- Website: http://www.KatieCarroll.com/

Katie Carroll is an American singer-songwriter from Dallas, Texas. She released her debut album, Paper Girl, on August 13, 2010. The Dallas Observer reported that her song, "Paper Girl", was No. 32 in Dallas for the year 2010. Her second album, Desperada, was released in 2012.

== Discography ==
=== Albums ===
- Paper Girl (2010)
- Desperada (2012)
