= Johnny, My Friend =

1985 novel by Peter Pohl

Johnny, My Friend (Swedish: Janne, min vän) is the first novel by the Swedish author Peter Pohl. It was published in Sweden in 1985. The English translation by Laurie Thompson was published in 1991.

== Plot summary ==
Johnny, My Friend is narrated by 12-year-old Krille. Krille is a naive youth, having grown up in a safe, supporting family in 1950s Stockholm. A new boy, Johnny, appears in Krille's life, and quickly impresses the neighborhood boys with his bicycling prowess. His popularity aside, Johnny is a bit of a mystery, rarely saying anything about his life. The boys of the neighborhood do not know where he lives, and sometimes he disappears for long periods, only to turn up again without explanation. Krille determines to solve the mystery of Johnny.

== Translations ==
The novel has been translated into 11 languages:

- Danish: Min bedste ven 1987
- Norwegian: Janne min venn 1988
- German: Jan, mein Freund 1990 (won the Deutscher Jugendliteraturpreis)
- Dutch: Jan, mijn vriend 1991
- English: Johnny, My Friend 1991
- French: Jan, mon ami 1995
- Italian: Il mio amico Jan 1996
- Estonian: Janne, mu sõber 1997
- Japanese: 『ヤンネ、ぼくの友だち』 1997
- Icelandic: Janni vinur minn 1997
- Low German: Jan, mien Fründ 2000

== Film adaptation ==
- The 1996 film My Friend Joe is based on the book.
