= Peter Pohl =

Swedish author, director and screenwriter

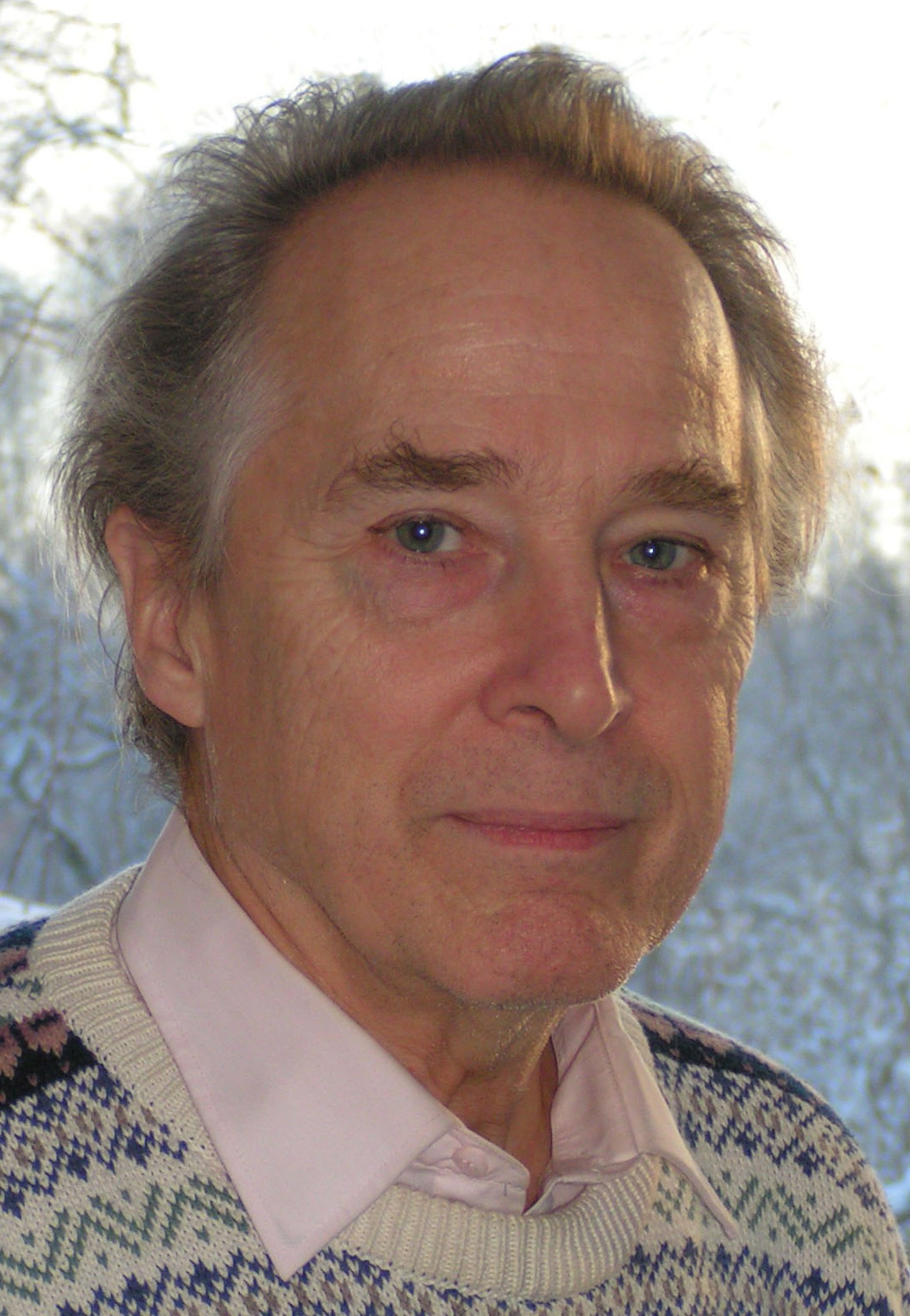
- Born: 5 December 1940 (age 85); Hamburg, Germany
- Occupation: Novelist
- Writing career
- Genres: Literature; young adult fiction; children's literature
- Website: www.nada.kth.se/~pohl/ppforf.html

Peter Pohl (born 5 December 1940) is a Swedish author and former director and screenwriter of short films. He has received prizes for several of his books and films, as well as for his entire work. From 1966 until his retirement in 2005, he was lecturer in Numerical analysis at KTH Royal Institute of Technology in Stockholm, Sweden.

== Biography ==
Peter Pohl was born on 5 December 1940 in Hamburg, Germany. He lost his father during World War II and moved to Sweden with his mother in 1945, where he started school in 1947. He went to the Södra Latin gymnasium in Stockholm until 1959. During this period, he engaged in medium-distance running, with good results, but he quit running when he was 19 years old. From his 15th until his 30th (1970), Pohl was part of the schools summer camp at Värmdö and later at Blidö. This period of his life is described in the books that form the Rainbow Series and are of particular influence of his other books.

He studied mathematics and physics and was a research assistant at the Swedish National Defence Research Institute for several years, starting in 1963. Pohl soon returned to university in order to graduate at KTH Royal Institute of Technology in Stockholm, where he received his doctorate in Numerical analysis in 1975. He became a lecturer in Numerical analysis and wrote several textbooks on this subject.

Pohl started filming in 1980 and won various prizes for his work. His writing career started in 1983 and two years later he published his first and most successful book, translated in English as Johnny, My Friend. Since then, he has published (As of 2008) 26 works of fiction.

He retired as a lecturer in 2005.

== Director ==
Before he published his first book, Pohl created a number of short films. Most of them were published in the 1980s and many have won various prizes, from, among others, the Union Internationale du Cinéma, Swedish short film and video, and Nordic short film.

Pohl has made a number of short films, mainly in the 1980s.

=== Filmography ===
- Nyckeln (The key), 1981, 15 minutes. It has been awarded several prizes:
  - Viktor (1st prize in amateur category) from Svensk Smalfilm och Video (now Sveriges Film- och Videoförbund, SFV), 1982.
  - Silver medal and editing prize (klippningspriset) at Nordisk Smalfilm, 1982.
  - 1st prize in the category Fantasy and 5th prize in all categories, short film contest, Argentina, 1982.
- Du har ju mej! (But you have me!), 1982, 20 minutes. Won the bronze prize and the actor prize at Svensk Smalfilm och Video in 1982.
- Medan nålen vandrar, 1982, 18 minutes.
- Visiten (The visit), 1982, 12 minutes.
- Alla klockor stannar (All clocks stop), 1983, 27 minutes.
- Resan till havet (The journey to the sea), 1984, 23 minutes. The contents are similar to those in his book Havet inom oss (the sea inside us).
  - Bronze medal at Svensk Smalfilm och Video, 1986.
- Muntlig tentamen (Oral exam), 1984.
  - Bronze medal at Svensk Smalfilm och Video, 1984.
  - Bronze medal at Union Internationale du Cinéma (UNICA), European short film contest in the German Democratic Republic, 1984.
- Stipendiet (The scholarship), 1985, 20 minutes.
  - Director prize and prize for best female actor, Sandy gala, Västerås, 1987.
  - Silver medal and actor prize at Svensk Smalfilm och Video, 1988.
- Ja, jag kommer! (Yes, I'm coming!), 1986, 16 minutes.
- Gunga flöjt.
  - Bronze medal at Svensk Smalfilm och Video, 1989.
- Det blir bättre nästa gång (It will be better next time), 1989, 20 minutes.
  - Silver medal and actor prize at Svensk Smalfilm och Video, 1991.
  - Silver medal at Nordisk Smalfilm
  - Gold medal and prize for best film at UNICA, European short film contest in Switzerland, 1991.
- Änglar behövs dom? (Angels, are they needed?), 1990. This film was made after his book Glittras Uppdrag (Glittras assignment)

== Author ==
Pohl has published a total number of 35 books: 9 textbooks and 26 works of fiction. He is primarily known for his works of fiction.

His fiction is mostly drama, but also includes two works of poetry, a book with fairy tales and a "picture book without pictures" that defies categorisation. In most of his books, children and teenagers are the main characters. He considers this to be the most important period of a life. Typical themes are loneliness, betrayal, lies, a longing for friendship, death. On his website, he writes that he does so because it is reality for many adults, youths and kids, and it would be a shame to be silent about that.

Of his drama, two books were translated into English: Johnny, My Friend about a mysterious new boy in the neighborhood, and I miss you, I miss you! about the loss of a twin sister. In total, 13 of his books have been translated into 13 languages, mostly in Norwegian, Danish and German, but more recently also in languages such as Estonian and Polish.

Among the books he published in the first four years of his writer career are three of the autobiographical books that form the rainbow series. Those are true and about his own life Those start with Regnbågen har bara åtta färger (The rainbow has only eight colours). In this book, Pohl described his early childhood, starting immediately after he moved to Sweden, until he was eight years old. The story takes place between 1945 and 1948. It is followed by Medan regnbågen bleknar (While the rainbow is fading), covering the period 1949 – 1952. Vilja växa (Want to grow up) described the period 1952 – 1958. The fourth book, Vi kallar honom Anna, he describes one year, particularly one summer, where he, part of the summercamp organisation, observes how a teenage boy is severely bullied. This book was published before Medan regnbågen bleknar and Vilja växa, just shortly after Regnbågen har bara åtta färger, and received a lot of attention and prizes. The final book in the series is Klara papper är ett måste, which starts in 1966. Additionally, the book De Stora Penslarnas lek, which Pohl describes as a starting point for his writing, contains fairy tales, based on the fairy tales from the grandfather in Regnbågen har bara åtta färger.

Other books, such as I miss you, I miss you! (co-written with Kinna Gieth) and Sekten are based on true stories that came to him directly or indirectly.

Some of his books were originally published as adult literature, but later recategorised as books for youth. Pohl does not consider himself an author of primarily youth literature. However, some books were written for children. Examples are Glittras uppdrag, a fairy tale about an angel that protects a six-year-old boy, and Malins kung Gurra, written for a contest organised by publisher Rabén & Sjögren.

== Bibliography ==
=== Textbooks ===
- Linjära differensekvationer med konstanta koefficienter; Liber, 1976
- Numeriska Metoder (with Gerd Eriksson and Germund Dahlquist); THS, 1977
- 220 ± 30 Exempel i Numeriska Metoder (with Gerd Eriksson); THS, 1978
- Introduktion till BASIC-programmering; THS, 1979
- Analytiska och Numeriska Metoder (with Eike Petermann); KTH, 1984
- Elementära Numeriska Metoder; THS, 1991
- Problem och Exempel i Numeriska Metoder; THS, 1992; Print on Demand 1997
- Grunderna i Numeriska Metoder; THS, 1995; NADA, KTH 1999
- Grundkurs i numeriska metoder; Liber, 2005.

=== Fiction ===
- Janne, min vän (Johnny, My Friend), 1985.
  - Translations: Danish (Min bedste ven, 1987), Norwegian (Janne min venn, 1988), German (Jan, mein Freund, 1990), Dutch (Jan, mijn vriend, 1991), English (Johnny, My Friend, 1991, translated by Laurie Thompson), French (Jan, mon ami, 1995), Italian (Il mio amico Jan, 1996 and 2005), Estonian (Janne, mu söber, 1997), Japanese (1997), Icelandic (Janni vinur minn, 1997), Low German (Jan, mien Fründ, 2000).
  - Prizes:
    - Litteraturfrämjandets debutantpris (prize for first appearance), 1985;
    - Nils Holgersson Plaque 1986;
    - Honorary list, 11th edition of the Premio Europeo di Letteratura Giovanile (European Prize for Youth Literature), Pier Paolo Vergerio, Padova, Italy, 1987
    - Deutscher Jugendliteraturpreis (German youth literature prize), 1990.
    - Kulturskylt, Stockholm Public Library, November 1999
- Regnbågen har bara åtta färger (The rainbow has only eight colours), 1986
  - Translations: German (Der Regenbogen hat nur acht Farben, 1993), Dutch (De regenboog heeft maar acht kleuren, 1995)
- Vi kallar honom Anna (We call him Anna), 1987.
  - Translations: German (Nennen wir ihn Anna, 1981), Danish (Vi kaldar ham Anna, 1989), Norwegian (Vi kaller ham Anna, 1989), Dutch (We noemen hem Anna, 1993).
  - Prizes:
    - Eule des Monats (Owl of the Month), Bulletin Jugend & Literatur (Bulletin Youth + Literature), Hardebek, Germany, 1991
    - Nominated for the Deutscher Jugendliteraturpreis, 1992
    - Vlag en Wimpel, Amsterdam, Netherlands, 1994
- Havet inom oss (The ocean within us), 1988. This book has largely the same contents as the short film Resan till havet.
- Alltid den där Anette! (Always that Anette!), 1988
- De Stora Penslarnas Lek (fairy tales)
- Medan regnbågen bleknar (While the rainbow is fading), 1989.
  - Translations: German (Während der Regenbogen verblasst, 1994), Norwegian (Mens regnbuen blekner, 1991)
  - Prizes:
    - Heffaklumpen, children books prize, Expressen, 1989.
- Kan ingen hjálpa Anette? (Can nobody help Anette?), 1990
- Malins kung Gurra (Malins king Gurra), 1991
  - Translations: German (Ich bin Malin, 1992), Danish (Du må gerne sova i min hånd, 1993)), Norwegian (Malin og Kong Gurra, 1994), Estonian (Pärast viimast hoiatust, 1999)
- Man har ett snärj, 1991
- Glittras uppdrag (Glittrag assignment), 1992.
  - Translations: German (Glittrag Auftrag, 1997)
- Jag saknar dig, jag saknar dig! (I miss you, I miss you!), 1992, with Kinna Gieth
  - Translations: German (Du fehlst mir, du fehlst mir!, 1994), Danish (Jeg savner dig, jeg savner dig, 1993), Norwegian (Jeg savner deg, jeg savner deg, 1993), Dutch (Ik mis je, ik mis je!, 1994), Finnish (Sinä ja minä ikuisesti, 1997), Icelandic (Ég sakna þin, 1998), English (I miss you, I miss you!, 1999), Slovene (Pogrešam te, pogrešam te, 1999)
  - Prizes:
    - Augustpriset (August prize), Bokförläggarföreningen, 1992
    - Deutscher Jugendliteraturpreis, Germany, 1995
- En röd sten till Carina (A red stone to Carina), 1993
- Vill dig (Want you), 1994. Poems.
- Vilja växa (Want to grow up), 1994.
- När alla ljuger (When all are lying), 1995.
  - Translations: Danish (Når alle lyver, 2000)
- Minns det (Remember that), 1996. Poems.
- Men jag glömmer dig inte (But I won't forget you), 1997.
  - Translations: German (Aber ich vergesse dich nicht, 1998), Norwegian (Men jeg glemmer dig ikke, 1998), Danish (Men jeg glemmer deg aldri, 1998)
  - Prizes:
    - Nominated for Augustpriset, 1997.
    - Fällt aus dem Rahmen, Fachzeitschrift für Kinder- und Jugendmedien, April 1998.
- Intet bortom det yttersta, 1998.
  - Translations: German (Unter der blauen Sonne, 2002), Norwegian (Tims historie, 1999).
  - Prizes:
    - Fällt aus dem Rahmen, October 2002
- Klara papper är ett måste, 1998
- Tillsammans kan vi förändra världen (Together we can change the world), 1998. "Picture book without pictures"
- Man kan inte säga allt, 1999.
  - Translations: Norwegian (Man kan ikke sige alt, 2001), Finnish (Valonarkaa, 2000)
- Jag är kvar hos er (I am still with you), 2000
  - Translations: German (Ich werde immer bei euch sein, 2003), Estonian (Ma olen ikka teiega, 2003)
- Tusen kulor, 2002.
  - Translations: Norwegian (Tusind kugler, 2004), Polish: Tysiąc kulek, 2005
- Sekten (The sect), 2005.
- Nu heter jag Nirak (Now my name is Nirak), 2007.
- Anton, jag gillar dig! (Anton, I love you!), 2008. Not published yet.

=== Number of translations per language ===
(Swedish)
26, soon 27
German: 10; Danish: 9; Norwegian: 6; Dutch: 4; Estonian: 3; English, Finnish, Icelandic: 2; French, Italian, Low German, Slovenian, Polish: 1; Total
13 books have been translated into at least one language. In total, the books have been translated to 13 different languages.
