= Anders Grönros =

Swedish film director and screenwriter

- Born: Erik Anders Sixten Grönros; 19 October 1953 (age 72); Rotebro, Sweden
- Occupations: Film director, scriptwriter

Erik Anders Sixten Grönros (born 19 October 1953), is a Swedish film director. He was awarded the Guldbagge Award for Best Director at the 27th Guldbagge Awards, for the film Agnes Cecilia – en sällsam historia. In 2007, his documentary Ambres – en död talar, which dealt with the medium Sture Johansson, and the spirit called Ambres, was broadcast on SVT2. The medium are claiming that it speaks through him.

== Filmography ==
- 1979 – Den åttonde dagen (director, writer)
- 1991 – Agnes Cecilia – en sällsam historia (director, writer)
- 1998 – Glasblåsarns barn (director, writer)
- 2007 – Ambres – en död talar (director, writer)
- 2011 – Jag saknar dig (director, writer)

== Radio ==
In 2005, Anders Grönros dramatised and directed a radio play version of Agnes Cecilia.
