= Cross-dressing in film and television =

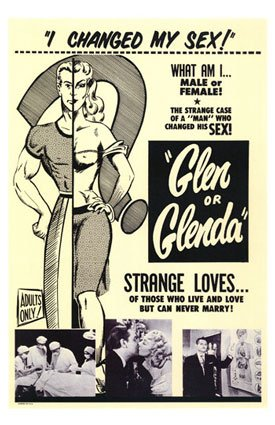
Film poster for Glen or Glenda

Cross-dressing and drag in film and television has followed a long history of cross-dressing and drag on the English stage, and made its appearance in the early days of the silent films. Charlie Chaplin and Stan Laurel brought the tradition from the English music halls when they came to the United States with Fred Karno's comedy troupe in 1910. Both Chaplin and Laurel occasionally dressed as women in their films. Even the beefy American actor Wallace Beery appeared in a series of silent films as a Swedish woman. The Three Stooges, especially Curly (Jerry Howard), sometimes appeared in drag in their short films. The tradition has continued for many years, usually played for laughs. Only in recent decades have there been dramatic films which included cross-dressing, possibly because of strict censorship of American films until the mid-1960s. One early exception was Alfred Hitchcock's thriller Murder!, where the murderer is a transvestite who wears particularly frilly dresses and petticoats. Cross-gender acting, on the other hand, refers to actors or actresses portraying a character of the opposite gender.

== Film and video ==
In Some Like It Hot (1959), two struggling musicians have to dress as women to escape the ire of gangsters. The film is a remake of a 1935 French movie, Fanfare of Love, from the story by Robert Thoeren and Michael Logan, which was remade in 1951 by German director Kurt Hoffmann as Fanfares of Love.

In Blake Edwards's 1982 musical comedy film Victor/Victoria, Victoria Grant, a struggling soprano, is unable to find work but she finds success when she becomes "Count Victor Grazinski", a female impersonator. The film is a remake of Viktor und Viktoria, a German film of 1933.

David Henry Hwang's 1988 play M. Butterfly focuses on a love affair between a French diplomat and a male Beijing opera singer who plays dan, or female, roles.

Dr. Frank 'n' Furter in The Rocky Horror Picture Show wore nothing but women's clothing the entire film/play.

In The Drew Carey Show, Drew's brother, Steve Carey, is a cross-dresser.

Robin Williams played a divorced father who dressed as a nanny to be with his children in the 1993 comedy Mrs. Doubtfire.

Dame Edna was an Australian female impersonator with "wisteria-colored hair" who did international chat shows in the 1990s.

Various installments of the British Carry On comedy film series, such as Carry On Constable (1960), Carry On Screaming! (1966), Carry On Again Doctor (1969), Carry On Matron (1972) and Carry On Girls (1973) featured male cast members who for various plot reasons masqueraded as women in female attire. Similarly, the films Carry On Jack (1966) and Carry On Dick (1974) featured female actors portraying male characters.

=== As a central plot element ===
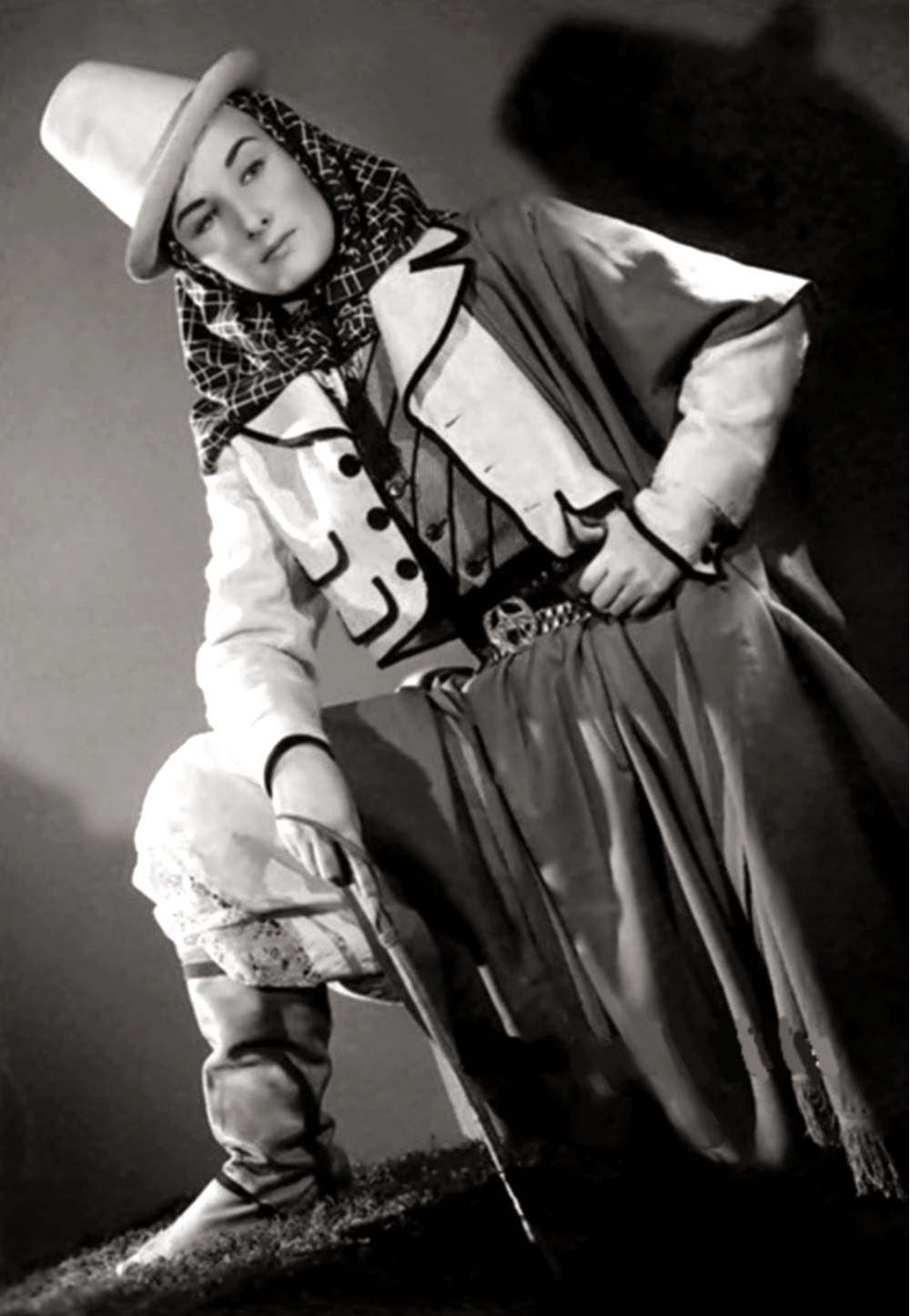
Actress Mirtha Legrand cross-dressed as a gaucho in the Argentine Golden Age film Vidalita (1949). Its parody of an icon of national identity and masculinity was panned on release but later reappraised.

Movies that feature cross-dressing as a central plot element:

- Films based on the 1599 or 1600 play As You Like It by William Shakespeare
  - As You Like It (1912) – an American film
  - As You Like It (1936)
  - As You Like It (2006)
- Films based on the 1601 or 1602 play Twelfth Night by William Shakespeare
  - Twelfth Night (1910) – an American film
  - Twelfth Night (1933) – an American film, the first film made by Orson Welles
  - Twelfth Night (1955) – a Soviet film
  - Twelfth Night (1986) – an Australian film
  - Twelfth Night: Or What You Will (1996) – a British film
- Several films based on the 1892 United Kingdom play Charley's Aunt by Brandon Thomas
  - La Zia di Carlo (1911) - an Italian film
  - Charley's Aunt (1915) – an American film
  - Charley's Aunt (1925) - an American film
  - Charley's Aunt (1926) - a Swedish film
  - Charley's Aunt (1930)
  - La tía de las muchachas (1938) – a Mexican film
  - Charley's (Big-Hearted) Aunt (1940)
  - Charley's Aunt (1941)
  - Fíjate qué suave (1948) – Mexican remake of La tía de las muchachas (1938)
  - Charleys Tante (1956) – a German film
  - Charles' Aunt (1959) – a Danish film starring Dirch Passer
  - Charleys Tante (1963) – a German film
  - Hello, I'm Your Aunt! (1975) – a Soviet film
  - La tía de Carlos (Charles' aunt) (1981) – a Spanish film starring Paco Martínez Soria
- Les Résultats du féminisme (1906) -- remade as In the Year 2000 (1912); the latter believed to be lost
- College Chums (1907) – a young man dresses a woman in order to get his friend out of trouble with his girlfriend
- Getting Even (1909) – Billy Quirk's character dresses as a woman to prank the other men in a mining camp
- Katchem Kate (1912) – Mabel Normand disguises herself as a man after becoming a detective
- Mabel's Adventures (1912) – Mabel Normand disguises herself as her "Cousin Jack" to test her suitors
- The Little House in Kolomna (1913) – a Russian comedy based on the joke poem by Alexander Pushkin starring Ivan Mosjoukine
- Mabel's Blunder (1914) – Mabel Normand's character and her brother swap clothes so she can spy on her fiancé
- The Masquerader (1914) – after being fired from a film studio, Charlie Chaplin's character dresses up as a woman in order to return to the studio
- Miss Bellboy (Fräulein Piccolo) (1914) – After the bellboy and maid of her parents' hotel run off together, Dorrit Weixler's character has to act (and dress) as both
- A Woman (1915) – Charlie Chaplin's character dresses up as "Nora" in order to spend more time with his new girlfriend Edna
- Her Father's Son (1916) – Vivian Martin's newly orphaned protagonist, taken in by her wealthy uncle (under the pretense, created by his estranged and relatively impoverished late brother, that his only child was actually a boy), impersonates his non-existent nephew in order to secure her promised share of his inheritance
- I Don't Want to Be a Man (Ich möchte kein Mann sein) (1918) – Ossi Oswalda is a woman who poses as a man to attend a lavish ball
- Know Thy Wife (1918) – After being secretly married, Dorothy Devore's character is brought home to meet the parents as her husband's friend "Steve"
- Yankee Doodle in Berlin (1919) – Bothwell Browne's character Captain Bob White dresses as a woman to steal a map from the Kaiser
- Chasing the Chaser (1925) – Frederick Kovert's detective disguises himself as a young woman to entrap an unfaithful husband
- Madame Behave (1925) – Julian Eltinge's character Jack poses as a woman to evade the police
- The Unholy Three (1925) – Lon Chaney's character Echo poses as an elderly woman to steal a necklace
- Beverly of Graustark (1926) – Marion Davies poses as her cousin, the Prince of Graustark, in order to secure the throne
- The Clinging Vine (1926) – Leatrice Joy starts the film as a severe businesswoman, with a suit and masculine hairstyle
- The Girl in Tails (1926) – Swedish comedy in which Magda Holm attends a graduation ceremony in her brother's tuxedo
- She Goes to War (1929) – Eleanor Boardman is the heroine who dresses as a man to fight in World War I
- That's My Wife (1929) – Stan Laurel poses as Oliver Hardy's wife to help him receive an inheritance
- The Unholy Three (1930) – sound remake
- Viktor und Viktoria (1933) – a woman impersonates a female impersonator, later remade as First a Girl (1935) and Victor Victoria in 1982; see below
- Queen Christina (1933) – Greta Garbo's character Christina often dresses as a boy to have greater freedom, eventually meeting Antonio, the Spanish envoy, dressed as a boy
- She Loves Me Not (1934), remade as True to the Army (1942) and How to Be Very, Very Popular (1955)
- Girls Will Be Boys (1934) – Dolly Haas disguises herself as a man
- Peter (1934) – a musical comedy by Henry Koster starring Franciska Gaal
- Czy Lucyna to dziewczyna? (Is Lucy a Girl?) (1934) – comedy directed by Juliusz Gardan; hoping to find work as a technician against the wishes of her father, the titular Lucyna disguises herself as a man
- Fanfare d'amour (1935) – a French comedy in which two poor musicians, played by Fernand Gravey and Julien Carette, dress as women to join an all-female jazz band. This movie inspired the later and more famous Some Like it Hot
- First a Girl (1935) – a comedy in which Jessie Matthews dresses as a man. English remake of Viktor und Viktoria (1933)
- Sylvia Scarlett (1935) – Katharine Hepburn dresses as a man for most of the film; this is her first film with Cary Grant
- The Devil Doll (1936) – Lionel Barrymore plays an evil, elderly woman
- Yiddle with His Fiddle (1936) – Molly Picon plays a traveling musician who dresses as a boy for safety
- Bringing Up Baby (1938) – Cary Grant cross-dresses
- Sysmäläinen (1938) – Finnish film set in the 17th century where the main female character disguises herself as a man who pretends to be a woman.
- The Black Sheep of Whitehall (1942) – comedian Will Hay wryly impersonates a nurse and spends the night with the hospital nurses in this wartime British comedy
- Luisito (1943) – Argentine comedy in which Paulina Singerman poses as her own fictitious brother in order to work as her boyfriend's secretary and investigate him
- Me ha besado un hombre (1944) – Mexican comedy in which María Elena Marqués adopts her deceased brother's identity to migrate from Spain to Mexico City; remade in 1953
- La hija del regimiento (1944) – Mexican musical comedy in which Mapy Cortés, secretly raised within an all-male regiment, cross-dresses as a cadet
- Fram för lilla Märta (1945) – a Swedish film; a musician, played by Stig Järrel, cross-dresses to get a job in an all-female orchestra
- Op med lille Martha (1946) – a Danish remake of Fram för lilla Märta
- Little Giant (1946) – Bud Abbott plays the Grandmother
- The Time of Their Lives (1946) – a comedy in which Marjorie Reynolds's character Melody Allen dresses as a man
- Boy! What a Girl! (1947) – playing the part of an out of work burlesque comic named Bumpsie, Tim Moore gives a frightfully hilarious female impersonation
- Enrédate y verás (1948) - Mexican comedy in which Emilia Guiú cross-dresses as her cousin, a soldier
- Vidalita (1949) – Argentine historical comedy in which Mirtha Legrand passes as a gaucho to win the approval of her grandfather, who wants a grandson, and is courted by an army captain who does not know whether she is a man or a woman; later reappraised as a veiled depiction of male homosexuality and a precursor of Argentine queer cinema
- I Was a Male War Bride (1949) – Cary Grant is a French officer who marries a U.S. Army officer played by Ann Sheridan and cross-dresses to pass as a bride
- Yo quiero ser hombre (1950) – Mexican comedy in which Alma Rosa Aguirre cross-dresses as a boy to carry out an inheritance scheme plotted by her aunt (Sara García)
- I Am Very Macho (1953) – Mexican comedy in which Silvia Pinal cross-dresses as her pilot brother and falls in love with the fleet's captain; remake of 1944's Me ha besado un hombre (A Man Kissed Me)
- Pablo and Carolina (1957) – filmed in 1955; Mexican musical comedy in which a socialite played by Irasema Dilián pretends to be her (non-existent) brother
- Das Wirtshaus im Spessart (1958) – young countess dresses as a poor boy and joins the robbers to save her friends
- Some Like It Hot (1959) – Tony Curtis and Jack Lemmon dress as women and join an all-female band in order to hide from the mob
- La joven mancornadora (1961) - Mexican rural musical comedy in which Lola Beltrán cross-dresses to avenge her father.
- Homicidal (1961) – male role played by Jean Arless was actually actress Joan Marshall
- Hussar Ballad (1962) – a Soviet musical comedy by Eldar Ryazanov based on the real-life story of Nadezhda Durova, a soldier during the Napoleonic Wars
- Blonde Cobra (1963) – Jack Smith spends the whole film in drag
- Me ha gustado un hombre (1965) – Mexican-Venezuelan co-production in which Tere Velázquez cross-dresses to get work as a hotel bellboy
- Gunn (1967) – the killer is revealed to be a cross-dresser
- Monsieur Hawarden (1968) – Mr. Hawarden is actually a woman disguised as a man to avoid prosecution for killing her lover, 15 years ago; based on a true story
- The Kremlin Letter (1969) – George Sanders plays a transvestite
- Sometimes Aunt Martha Does Dreadful Things (1971) – two criminals hide from the law, with one of them pretending to be the other's aunt
- Poszukiwany, poszukiwana (1973) – comedy directed by Stanisław Bareja; after a painting disappears from an art museum, an employee is falsely suspected of being responsible, and decides to go into hiding in the guise of a housemaid, until he can paint a perfect copy of the picture
- Female Trouble (1974) – Divine plays an obese criminal woman and an obese man
- The Rocky Horror Picture Show (1975) – Tim Curry plays a self-proclaimed "sweet transvestite from Transsexual, Transylvania"
- Once Upon a Girl (1976) – Hal Smith portrayed as the lewd Mother Goose who is on trial for obscenity due to telling the pornographic versions of three of the famous fairy tales
- Outrageous! (1977) – Craig Russell impersonates famous women.
- Perfect Gentlemen (1978) – The four wives (Lauren Bacall, Ruth Gordon, Sandy Dennis and Lisa Pelikan) pose as male robbers to rob a hotel safe
- La Cage aux Folles (1978) – features female impersonators
- Lady Oscar (1979) – the female protagonist dresses as a man, but privately acknowledges her feminine side
- Dressed to Kill (1980) – the killer dresses as a woman
- Victor Victoria (1982) – transvestism in various forms is included in this musical comedy, remake of Viktor und Viktoria (1933); see above
- Tootsie (1982) – Dustin Hoffman becomes the female star of a television soap opera
- Yentl (1983) – Barbra Streisand poses as a boy in order to study at a yeshiva
- The Wicked Lady (1983) – Faye Dunaway plays a bored English aristocrat who disguises herself as a highwayman in order to rob carriages carrying passengers
- A Blade in the Dark (1983) – Michele Soavi plays Tony Rendina/Linda
- Sahara (1984) – Brooke Shields disguises herself as a young man so she can compete in a car race in the African desert
- Her Life as a Man (1984) – Robyn Douglass is a female reporter who poses as a man to land a job as a sportswriter for a national magazine. Based on an article by Carol Lynn Mithers.
- Just One of the Guys (1985) – Joyce Hyser plays a boy so she can win a journalism contest
- He's My Girl (1987) – T.K. Carter plays Reggie who pretends to be Regina when his friend wins a contest trip to Los Angeles
- Mascara (1987) – a hermaphrodistic transvestite (played by Eva Robin's) and a trans woman (played by Romy Haag) are murdered
- Too Outrageous! (1987) – Craig Russell impersonates famous women.
- Delinquent in Drag (1988) – Suke Banji gets expelled from school and is forced to masquerade as a girl in his next school
- Torch Song Trilogy (1988) – Harvey Fierstein plays Arnold, a New York female impersonator
- Quisiera ser hombre (1988) – Mexican comedy in which Lucero poses as a man to get work in the fashion industry.
- Nobody's Perfect (1990) – Chad Lowe is kicked off his college's tennis team and dresses up as a girl to join the women's team and be closer to his crush
- Nuns on the Run (1990) – Eric Idle and Robbie Coltrane disguise as nuns
- Just Like a Woman (1992) – Adrian Pasdar is Gerald, a finance executive and transvestite, who finds himself thrown out by his wife, when she discovers women's underwear in their flat
- Ladybugs (1992) – Jonathan Brandis dresses as a girl to play on the girls' soccer team
- A Little Bit of Lippy (1992) – Chris Bernard Husband is discovered cross-dressing, wife and community must come to terms
- Little Sister (1992) – Bobby (Jonathan Silverman) becomes Roberta in order to infiltrate a sorority house and be close to Diana (Alyssa Milano)
- Mrs. Doubtfire (1993) – Robin Williams's character Daniel Hillard disguises himself as a woman so he can see his children
- Anything for Love (1993) – Chris (Corey Haim) dresses as a girl to avoid his tormentors at school
- My Summer as a Girl (1994) – Tony (Zach Braff) cross-dresses to get a job as a chambermaid
- The Adventures of Priscilla, Queen of the Desert (1994) – an offbeat comedy of two men and a trans woman traveling cross country to perform a drag show in the outback of Australia
- He's a Woman, She's a Man (1994) – Wing (Anita Yuen) is a sassy girl who enters a country-wide, males-only talent search, disguised as a man
- Color of Night (1994) – Jane March's character Rose disguises herself as her dead brother Richie
- Ed Wood (1994) – Directed by Tim Burton, the biopic stars Johnny Depp as the famous low-budget cross-dressing filmmaker
- All Men Are Liars (1995) – Mick becomes Michelle to join an all-female band in order to earn some money as a musician
- To Wong Foo, Thanks for Everything! Julie Newmar (1995) – three drag queens help people in a small town after their Cadillac breaks down on the way to Los Angeles
- My Friend Joe (1996) – Joe (Schuyler Fisk) is a girl disguising as a boy
- The Associate (1996) – Whoopi Goldberg dresses as a white man to prove Wall Street wrong
- The Birdcage (1996) – features drag queens, including Albert Goldman (Nathan Lane), who dresses up like Val Goldman's mother to help him win the hand of his girlfriend
- Chachi 420 (1998) – a Bollywood film reminiscent of Mrs. Doubtfire, in which a father gets divorced and also loses the custody of his daughter
- Mulan (1998) – a Chinese woman disguises herself as a soldier under the name Ping to fight the Huns in place of her father
- Shakespeare in Love (1998) – includes Shakespeare's use of female impersonators in his plays
- Ask Harriet (1998) - A sexist sports journalist decides to apply for the job of female advice columnist.
- Adolescence of Utena (1999) – Utena Tenjou, a bisexual girl, cross-dresses as a male student at Ohtori Academy where she is drawn into a series of swordsmen's duels to win the hand of Anthy Himemiya, the mysterious "Rose Bride"
- Flawless (1999) – a conservative security guard (Robert De Niro) suffers a stroke, and is assigned to a rehabilitative program that includes singing lessons with the drag queen next door
- Bruno (2000) – an eight-year-old boy who wears dresses as a source of empowerment as well as feeling the need to express himself while trying to win the spelling bee
- Big Momma's House (2000) – Martin Lawrence plays an FBI agent who goes undercover and dresses as a heavy-set woman
- Holiday Heart (2000) – Holiday Heart (Ving Rhames) is a gay drag queen who performs at a night club
- All the Queen's Men (2001) – Matt LeBlanc and Eddie Izzard head a team of Army men sent to infiltrate a German factory dressed as women
- Motocrossed (2001) – Alana Austin is a girl whose father will not let her race because she's a girl, so she goes undercover and poses as a male racer to race for her twin brother
- Triumph of Love (2001) – Mira Sorvino plays the daughter of a usurper, who disguises herself as a young male scholar named Phocion to get closer to Agis, the rightful heir to the throne
- Sorority Boys (2002) – Barry Watson, Michael Rosenbaum, and Harland Williams pose as girls when they're kicked out of their dorm
- Juwanna Mann (2002) – a disgraced NBA player (Miguel A. Núñez Jr.) is fired from his job and dresses as a loud-mouthed Southern belle in order to join the WNBA
- The Hot Chick (2002) – Rob Schneider plays a girl who turns into a man overnight, and must find a way to change back
- Girls Will Be Girls (2003) – all three of the main characters (Evie, Coco and Varla) are drag alter egos of the actors, who have existed "on their own" for several years
- Party Monster (2003) – Seth Green plays club personality James St. James
- Stage Beauty (2004) – Ned Kynaston (Billy Crudup) is an actor famed for his portrayal of female characters, particularly Desdemona in Othello
- Freddy vs. Jason (2003) - Freddy Krueger (Robert Englund) disguises himself as Jason Voorhees's mother, (Pamela Voorhees) to convince him to kill some people in Springwood.
- Connie and Carla (2004) – Nia Vardalos and Toni Collette go on the run, after accidentally witnessing a mafia hit in Chicago, and wind up posing as drag queens at a gay club
- White Chicks (2004) – Shawn and Marlon Wayans play FBI agent brothers who must protect two cruise line heiresses from a kidnapping plot while in disguise of the women they are protecting
- Kinky Boots (2005) – Chiwetel Ejiofor's character Simon cross-dresses as drag queen Lola
- Tyler Perry portrayed as Madea in a series of comedy films:
  - Diary of a Mad Black Woman (2005)
  - Madea's Family Reunion (2006)
  - Meet the Browns (2008)
  - Madea Goes to Jail (2009)
  - I Can Do Bad All by Myself (2009)
  - Madea's Big Happy Family (2011)
  - Madea's Witness Protection (2012)
  - A Madea Christmas (2013)
  - Boo! A Madea Halloween (2016)
  - Boo 2! A Madea Halloween (2017)
  - A Madea Family Funeral (2019)
  - A Madea Homecoming (2022)
  - Madea's Destination Wedding (2025)
- She's the Man (2006) – Amanda Bynes dresses as a man to be accepted in Illyria's boys' soccer team and get revenge in Cornwall; based on the play Twelfth Night by William Shakespeare
- Butch Jamie (2007) – writer/director/actor Michelle Ehlen plays a butch lesbian actress who gets cast as a man in a film
- Jolly Fellows (2009) – film about five drag performers
- Dil Bole Hadippa! (2009) – Bollywood actress Rani Mukerji plays a girl who dresses as a boy in order to play on the Indian cricket team
- Cockpit (2012) – Jonas Karlsson portrays the pilot Valle who re-applies for the job as Maria and wins it through affirmative action
- Sisterakas (2012) – a film from the Philippines starring Vice Ganda as Bernice Sabroso
- The Rocky Horror Picture Show: Let's Do the Time Warp Again (2016) – Laverne Cox plays a transvestite.
- Naughty Grandma (2017) – Aleksandr Rubenstein (Aleksandr Revva) is forced to hide from his pursuers in his uncle's nursing home, posing as a grandmother.
- Amnesia Love (2018) – Kimmer (Paolo Ballesteros) is a gay man who tries to remember his gender orientation after being washed up in a remote island
- Boyette: Not a Girl Yet (2020) – Boyette Camacho (Zaijian Jaranilla) is a flamboyant gay college student who generally cross-dresses while pretending to be straight to get closer to his crush Charles (Inigo Pascual)
- Stage Mother (2020) - A conservative Christian woman (Jacki Weaver) inherits her gay son's drag club in San Francisco following his death.
- Everybody's Talking About Jamie (2021) - The story follows and is based upon the true-life story of 16-year-old British Jamie Campbell, as he overcomes prejudice and bullying, to step out of the darkness and become a drag queen.
- Enter the Drag Dragon (2023) - A drag-themed B-movie parody in which a drag queen detective is drawn into a bizarre criminal underworld.
- Hemet, or the Landlady Don't Drink Tea (2023) - Liz Topham-Myrtle, the film's titular landlord, is portrayed in drag makeup by screenwriter Brian Patrick Butler.

=== As a non-comedic element ===
Most of the above films are comedies. Films in which cross-dressing is treated in a more serious manner are relatively rare, although the list does include several dramas and biopics.

- The Female Highwayman (1906) – Features a female criminal who dresses as a man while committing thefts and an armed robbery
- Filibus (1915) – The sky pirate Filibus disguises herself as both a Baron and Baroness in this Italian adventure/crime
- Poor Little Peppina (1916) – Mary Pickford's character disguises herself as a boy after running away from home
- Hamlet: The Drama of Vengeance (1921) – In this German adaptation, Hamlet (Asta Nielsen) was raised as a boy in order to secure the throne
- Beggars of Life (1928) – Louise Brooks's character goes on the run disguised as a boy after killing her abusive foster father
- Hotel Splendide (1932) – Features a criminal gang whose leader disguises himself as "Mrs. LeGrange"
- Young Fugitives (1938) – The heroine dresses as a man.
- Shadows on the Stairs (1941) – Tom Armitage (Miles Mander), dresses as a woman.
- The Wicked Lady (1945) – The heroine poses as a highwayman.
- She Wore a Yellow Ribbon (1949) – The heroine wears a cavalry uniform to accompany her uncle to safety.
- Glen or Glenda (1953) – Inspired by his own experiences, Ed Wood wrote, directed, and starred in the movie as a troubled cross-dresser, in a sort of plea for acceptance. Originally an exploitation film about Christine Jorgensen.
- Psycho (1960) – Norman Bates (Anthony Perkins), is a killer who wears his dead mother's clothes.
- Monsieur Hawarden (1968) – Title character Mr. Hawarden is actually a woman who disguises herself as a man to avoid prosecution for a murder she committed fifteen years ago.
- The Goat Horn (1972) - Kara Ivan (Anton Gorchev) is a Bulgarian shepherd. After his wife was raped and killed by the Turkish, he disguised his daughter Maria (Katya Paskaleva) as a boy and trained her in the masculine art of warfare to take refenge.
- Theatre of Blood (1973) – Edwina Lionheart (Diana Rigg) helps her father Edward execute a plan to get revenge on theater critics. To do this, she dresses as a man: puts on a wig, sunglasses and a false mustache.
- Dog Day Afternoon (1975) – Sonny robs a bank to finance his wife Leon's sex change operation. Chris Sarandon plays Leon.
- The Tenant (1976) – The main character suffers from a split personality.
- A Strange Role (1976) – The Hungarian revolutionary is forced to hide from the persecutors, changing into a woman's dress in the sanatorium Hercules Waters.
- Yentl (1983) – Barbra Streisand plays a Polish Jewish woman who disguises herself as a man so she can study the Talmud in early 20th-century Europe.
- Gardes-Marines, Ahead! (1988) – Dmitry Kharatyan plays a Gardes-Marine Aleksei Korsak who disguises himself as a girl.
- Last Exit to Brooklyn (1989) Alexis Arquette plays Georgette, a transvestite, thrown out of the family home who falls in love with a local criminal.
- The Silence of the Lambs (1991) – Ted Levine plays serial killer Jame Gumb, better known as Buffalo Bill who makes the skins of his female victims into a woman suit for him to wear.
- Pret-A-Porter - Danny Aiello's character is revealed to be a cross-dresser towards the end of the film, wearing a Chanel suit which viewers had presumed was for his mistress.
- The Ballad of Little Jo (1993) – A lone woman in the Old West takes on a male role in order to survive.
- M. Butterfly (1993) – a French diplomat (Jeremy Irons) becomes infatuated with a dan performer (John Lone) in a Chinese opera, where all roles are performed by men.
- The Adventures of Priscilla, Queen of the Desert (1994) — a drag queen takes his act on the road.
- The King of Masks (1996) – A Chinese girl poses as a boy in order to get adopted by an elderly man.
- Liang Po Po: The Movie (1999) – Jack Neo cross-dressed as an elderly woman.
- Baran (2001) – An Iranian boy falls in love with a young Afghan refugee, who must dress as a boy to keep her job at a construction site.
- Osama (2003) – A 12-year-old Afghan girl dresses like a boy in order to get a job during the regime of the Taliban.
- The Heart is Deceitful Above All Things (2004) – While on the run, Sarah disguises her son, Jeremiah, as a girl and passes him off as her "sister" until he is raped by her current boyfriend and is found out. (Note: In the film adaption, Jeremiah is played by both Cole and Dylan Sprouse in different scenes, both of whom have had several other roles that involved cross-dressing.)
- Peacock (2010) – Cillian Murphy plays John Skillpa, a man who as a result of severe child abuse has formed the alternate personality of Emma Skillpa and dresses as a woman to become Emma.
- Albert Nobbs (2011) – Glenn Close plays a 19th-century Irish woman who poses as a man to work as a butler in Dublin's most elegant hotel.
- Les Misérables (2012) – Éponine changes her clothes from feminine to masculine in order to join the June Rebellion.
- The Boxtrolls (2014) – Archibald Snatcher is disguised as Madame Frou-Frou.
- Rudhramadevi (2015) – A young princess is disguised as a boy to keep the succession of her royal family line intact.
- Teen Titans Go! To the Movies (2018) – Slade is disguised as a female film director named Jade Wilson.
- Jump, Darling (2020) - Russell (Thomas Duplessie) tries to build a name for himself as a drag performer after being forced to move from Toronto back to his hometown in Prince Edward County.
- Solo (2023) - A doomed romance between drag performers Simon (Théodore Pellerin) and Olivier (Félix Maritaud).
- Rose (2026) - A woman disguises as a soldier during the Thirty Years' War

=== As a minor plot element ===
Many other comedy films include instances of humorous cross-dressing, but do not feature it as a central plot element. Movies in which cross-dressing plays a minor but important role include:

- Comic Costume Race (1896) – Men compete in running, wearing women's clothes.
- Where Is Coletti? (1913) - As part of one of his disguises, the titular character dresses up as a woman
- His Wedding Night (1917) – Buster Keaton tries on a wedding dress
- The Four Horsemen of the Apocalypse (1921) – During a drunken feast in an occupied castle, some German officers start dancing while wearing women's dresses. Of the scene, June Mathis would later tell the Los Angeles Times, "I had the German officers coming down the stairs with women's clothing on. To hundreds of people that meant no more than a masquerade party. To those who have lived and read, and who understand life, that scene stood out as one of the most terrific things in the picture."
- Dr. Mabuse the Gambler (1922) – Anita Berber performs in a tuxedo
- Entr'acte (1924) – Inge Frïss poses as bearded ballerina.
- Morocco (1930) – Marlene Dietrich wears a tuxedo.
- Sherlock Holmes (1932) – Clive Brook poses as a woman.
- Babes in Toyland (1934) – Stan Laurel poses as a bride.
- The Scarlet Pimpernel (1934) – Leslie Howard poses as a woman.
- The Bold Caballero (1936) – Robert Livingston poses as a woman.
- Professor Beware (1938) – Harold Lloyd poses as a woman.
- Kentucky Moonshine (1938) – At the end of the radio show, the Ritz Brothers dance in women's dresses.
- Tower of London (1939) – Nan Grey poses as a chimney sweep.
- Vasilisa the Beautiful (1940) – Georgy Millyar plays an old witch Baba Yaga. He reprised this role in the films Jack Frost (1964), Fire, Water, and Brass Pipes (1968), The Golden Horns (1973) and (cameo appearance) Finist, the Brave Falcon (1976). He also voiced the role of Baba Yaga in the cartoon The Frog Princess (1954 cartoon) (1954).
- Honolulu Lu (1941) – Lupe Vélez dresses up as Adolf Hitler in this wartime comedy.
- This Is the Army (1942) - Ronald Reagan stars as Lt Johnny Jones, the producer of an all US Army musical revue featuring a performance of soldiers in drag.
- National Velvet (1944) – Elizabeth Taylor as Velvet Brown, who disguises herself as a male jockey, and trains a horse for the Grand National steeplechase.
- Sunset Boulevard (1950) – Gloria Swanson dresses up as Charlie Chaplin.
- Houdini (1953) – Janet Leigh dresses up as Harry Houdini.
- Calamity Jane (1953) – Dick Wesson poses as an actress.
- I Vitelloni (1953) – Alberto (Alberto Sordi) goes to the carnival in a woman's dress.
- Casanova's Big Night (1954) – Bob Hope appears in drag.
- The Belles of St. Trinian's (1954) – Alastair Sim plays twins, headmistress Millicent Fritton and her brother Clarence Fritton.
- White Christmas (1954) - Bing Crosby and Danny Kaye take over from Rosemary Clooney and Vera-Ellen's performance of "Sisters" in order for them to make a getaway from an abusive landlord.
- Abbott and Costello Meet the Keystone Kops (1955) – Lou Costello appears in drag.
- The Bridge on the River Kwai (1957) - Percy Herbert and a group of British soldiers perform in drag during a morale event celebrating the completion of the bridge.
- Man of a Thousand Faces (1957) – James Cagney dresses as a woman for a few scenes.
- South Pacific - Mitzi Gaynor and Ray Walston perform in drag during a show during a Thanksgiving morale event for the sailors stationed on a South Pacific island during World War II.
- Die schöne Lügnerin (1959) – Constanze Hübner (Romy Schneider) sneaks into the ball dressed as a man. In another episode, a secret police agent dresses up in a woman's dress, posing as a flower seller.
- Swiss Family Robinson (1960) – Janet Munro dresses as a boy to appear less vulnerable to pirates.
- The Night Before Christmas (1961) – Georgy Millyar, who played the Devil, also appears in a small role as a gossip girl.
- The Silence (1963) – Out of curiosity, Johan (Jörgen Lindström) enters the hotel room where the dwarf artists are staying. They jokingly dress the guest in a woman's dress.
- Thunderball (1965) – A former enemy of James Bond fakes his death and poses as his own widow in the prologue segment.
- The Producers (1968) – Roger De Bris (Christopher Hewett) appears in a women's evening gown and tiara.
- Head (1968) – T. C. Jones played the dual male/female roles of Mr. and Mrs. Ace.
- The Damned (1969) – Directed by Luchino Visconti. Martin's (a character played by Helmut Berger) drag performance as Marlene Dietrich in The Blue Angel at his grandfather's birthday celebration, notorious at the time of the film's release, has since become an iconic image in cinema history.
- Attention, Turtle! (1970) – Rolan Bykov plays Vova Didenko's grandmother.
- Diamonds Are Forever (1971) – Bond's arch enemy Ernst Stavro Blofeld dresses up as a woman to escape from his Hotel hideout.
- Gentlemen of Fortune (1972) – The Soviet criminal comedy; escaped prisoners dress up in women's clothing.
- Freebie and the Bean (1973) – Mystery hit man turns out to be a convincing transvestite.
- Three Wishes for Cinderella (1973) – Cinderella (Libuše Šafránková) uses a magical hazelnut to dress up as a young huntsman and join the Prince's hunting party.
- Arabian Nights (1974) – Zumurrud disguises as a man and comes to a far-away kingdom where she becomes king.
- Thunderbolt and Lightfoot (1974) – Jeff Bridges cross-dresses to distract bank guards in a robbery.
- Fantozzi (1975) – Adult actor Plinio Fernando plays Mariangela, Fantozzi's daughter. Also in some sequels.
- Salò, or the 120 Days of Sodom (1975) – The four masters dress in women's clothes and coerce their male victims, clothed in wedding dresses, into same-sex marriage.
- Incorrigible (1975) – Private eye Victor Vauthier (Jean-Paul Belmondo) dresses up as a transvestite to expose his client's cheating husband, but is arrested by the police during a raid.
- The Wild Goose Chase (1975) – The film's antagonists perform as drag queens as part of a theatrical show; the story is set in motion when one of them commits a robbery while in drag.
- Gable and Lombard (1976) – Carole Lombard (Jill Clayburgh) disguises herself as an extra to see Clark Gable (James Brolin) act.
- The Wing or the Thigh (1976) – Taster Charles Duchemin (Louis de Funès) disguises himself in a woman's dress to avoid being recognized by the owners of the restaurant.
- Hello, river! (1979) – A girl named Natasha, nicknamed "Bullet" (Katya Sychyova), pretends to be a boy in order to save the river together with other boys.
- The Apple Dumpling Gang Rides Again (1979) – Amos (Tim Conway) and Theodore (Don Knotts) disguise themselves as bar-room dance girls to hide themselves from the gang of "Big Mac" (Jack Elam).
- Monty Python's Life of Brian (1979) – Several "women" (actually portrayed by the all-male Python ensemble) disguise themselves as men in order to attend a stoning.
- Gift of Fate (1977) – Zoya (Natalya Chenchik) plays the role of Khlestakov in an amateur performance based on the Nikolai Gogol's play The Government Inspector.
- Dragonslayer (1981) – Caitlin Clarke plays a young woman whose father disguised her as a boy from birth in order to protect her from an annual lottery in which young women are selected to be fed to the dragon.
- Family Relations (1981) – Young actor Fedor Stukov plays Irishka, Nina's daughter.
- Das Boot (1981) - One of the crew performs in drag during a lighthearted moment as they let off some steam to ease the boredom of weeks on picket duty.
- Nighthawks (1981) – Wulfgar (Rutger Hauer) sets out to kill Irene DaSilva (Lindsay Wagner), unaware that it is Sgt. Dick DaSilva (Sylvester Stallone), who has donned women's clothing and a wig.
- Santa Claus Is a Stinker (1982) – Christian Clavier plays a transvestite named Katia.
- Liquid Sky (1982) – Anne Carlisle played the dual male/female roles of Jimmy and Margaret.
- The Year of Living Dangerously (1982) – Linda Hunt plays the male role of photographer Billy Kwan (but won an Oscar for Best Supporting Actress). Film critic Roger Ebert wrote about her performance: "Billy Kwan is played, astonishingly, by a woman—Linda Hunt, a New York stage actress who enters the role so fully that it never occurs to us that she is not a man. This is what great acting is, a magical transformation of one person into another".
- Deathstalker (1983) – The sorcerer Munkar, turns his henchman Gargit into the image of Princess Codille (Barbi Benton), in order to seduce the hero Deathstalker.
- Yellowbeard (1983) – Captain Hughes sneaks a woman on board ship by having her dress as a man.
- Spokoystvie otmenyaetsya (1983) – Demobilized sergeant Nikolai Gorovoy (Ivan Shabaltas) dresses up in a woman's gypsy outfit to deceive his father.
- Le Marginal (1983) – Jean-Claude Dreyfus plays the role of a transvestite.
- Angel (1984) – Dick Shawn plays street-smart transvestite, who is like a den-mother to the main character, child prostitute, Angel.
- Ronia, the Robber's Daughter (1984) – A robber dresses as a female to con other robbers.
- Mary Poppins, Goodbye (1984) – Oleg Tabakov plays Miss Euphemia Andrew.
- Cannonball Run II (1984) – J.J. McClure (Burt Reynolds), Victor Prinzi (Dom DeLuise), and Morris Fenderbaum (Sammy Davis Jr.) dress up as belly dancers.
- Pee-wee's Big Adventure (1985) – To disguise themselves from the police, Pee-wee Herman and an escaped convict dress as husband and wife, with Pee-wee as the wife.
- The Kings of Gag (1985) – Michel Serrault plays the role of popular TV comedian Gaëtan, famous among other things for his comedic female roles. Coluche also plays the role of Georges Khorseri, who appears in women's clothing.
- Castle in the Sky (1986) – Pazu disguises Princess Sheeta as a boy in attempt to escape from the air pirates.
- Armed and Dangerous (1986) – Frank Dooley (John Candy) dresses as a Divine-type drag queen to track down criminals.
- Betty Blue (1986) – Zorg dresses (and passes) as a woman ("Josephine") in two crucial scenes.
- Les Fugitifs (1986) – Jean Lucas (Gérard Depardieu), François Pignon (Pierre Richard) and his daughter Jeanne (Anaïs Bret) dress up and pretend to be the vacationing family: Jean being the father, François the mother, and Jeanne, after Jean giving her a haircut, as their son, Jean-Claude.
- Outrageous Fortune (1987) – Bette Midler and Shelley Long disguise themselves as pre-pubescent boys to gain entry into a remote brothel in New Mexico.
- Willow (1988) – Madmartigan (portrayed by Val Kilmer) disguises himself (unsuccessfully) as a woman to hide an apparent infidelity from a jealous husband.
- Hairspray (1988) – While not exactly a plot element, the role of Edna Turnblad has always been played by a man in drag, and was indeed written with that intention, most recently portrayed by John Travolta in the 2007 remake.
- Island of Rusty General (1988) – Alexander Lenkov plays the role of the robot Baba Yaga.
- Tango & Cash (1989) – Gabriel Cash (Kurt Russell) cross-dresses to escape from the police.
- Three Fugitives (1989) – Daniel James Lucas (Nick Nolte), Ned Perry (Martin Short) and his daughter Megan (Sarah Doroff) dress up and pretend to be the vacationing family: Daniel being the father, Ned Perry the mother, and Megan, after Daniel giving her a haircut, as their son.
- Total Recall (1990) – Arnold Schwarzenegger disguises himself as a woman in an attempt to avoid Michael Ironside, who wants to capture him on his return to Mars.
- Sleeping with the Enemy (1991) – Julia Roberts's character disguises herself as a young man in order to visit her elderly mother and avoid her possessive husband.
- Robin Hood (1991) – Uma Thurman's character Marion disguises as Martin to join the band of Robin Hood.
- Hook (1991) – Glenn Close plays a pirate who is part of Captain Hook's crew.
- Nothing but Trouble (1991) – John Candy plays twins, brother Dennis Valkenheiser and sister Eldona Valkenheiser.
- Good Luck, Gentlemen (1992) – Former Soviet officers, dressed in women's dresses, take part in a beauty contest.
- Weather Is Good on Deribasovskaya, It Rains Again on Brighton Beach (1992) – KGB agent Fyodor Sokolov (Dmitry Kharatyan) dresses up as a prostitute to catch a maniac.
- The Adventures of Huck Finn (1993) – Huckleberry Finn (Elijah Wood) disguises himself as a girl under the name Sarah-Mary Williams to steal things in a woman's house.
- Robin Hood: Men in Tights (1993) – Little John, Ahchoo, Will Scarlet O'Hara and Blinkin disguise themselves as women to go see the archery contest that Robin of Loxley is competing in.
- Mr. Nanny (1993) – Hulk Hogan's Sean Armstrong puts on the outfit of a ballerina.
- Fatal Instinct (1993) - Armand Assante's Ned Ravine dances in a pair of red stilettos to the tune of "Brown Eyed Girl" by Van Morrison.
- Junior (1994) – Arnold Schwarzenegger disguises himself to hide in a women's shelter during the last few months of an experimental male pregnancy.
- Captain Pronin 4: Captain Pronin at the Opera (1994) – Captain Pronin puts on the outfit of a ballerina.
- Haruka Tenou is a lesbian girl who regularly cross-dresses as a boy due to her romantic relationship with Michiru Kaiou in a series of Sailor Moon films:
  - Sailor Moon S: The Movie (1994)
  - Sailor Moon SuperS: The Movie (1995)
  - Sailor Moon Eternal (2021)
- The Brady Bunch Movie (1995) – RuPaul Charles appears in drag as high school guidance counselor named Mrs. Cummings.
- Shirli-myrli (1995) – Vasily Krolikov (Valery Garkalin) changes into a woman's dress, hiding from his pursuers.
- Kids in the Hall: Brain Candy (1996) – Several female characters played by The Kids in the Hall, a Canadian comedy troupe.
- Beverly Hills Ninja (1997) – Gobei (Robin Shou) disguises as a woman to look out for Haru (Chris Farley), who disguises as a waiter who unknowingly serves on a table Gobei sits on in a Japanese restaurant for a mission.
- Con Air (1997) – Renoly Santiago appears as Ramon 'Sally-Can't Dance' Martinez – an effeminate, transvestite inmate who appears sexually subservient to his fellow detainees.
- The Fifth Element (1997) – Chris Tucker appears as Ruby Rhod, a "RuPaul/Dennis Rodman"-inspired media sensation who tags along with Korben Dallas on his mission to save the earth.
- The Waterboy (1998) - In a black & white dream sequence, Henry Winkler's Coach Klein who is on the phone with his grandmother can be briefly seen in a pair of heels as he stomps in them three times by shouting "I just hate him, I hate him, I hate him!".
- Between Your Legs (1999) – Victor Rueda passes as a woman in this Spanish drama.
- Wild Wild West (1999) – U.S. Marshal Artemus Gordon (Kevin Kline) disguises himself as a prostitute. Jim West (Will Smith) also appears as a belly dancer to rescue U.S. Marshal Artemus Gordon from antagonist Arliss Loveless (Kenneth Branagh).
- The Boondock Saints (1999) – FBI Agent Paul Smecker (Willem Dafoe) disguises himself as a prostitute in order to infiltrate the Yakavetta headquarters.
- 100 Girls (2000) – Jonathan Tucker's character Matthew dresses in drag.
- The Last of the Blonde Bombshells (2000) – Ian Holm plays Patrick, who attempted to avoid enlistment during World War II by dressing as a woman.
- Wonder Boys (2000) – Michael Cavadias's character Tony/Antonia is a part-time transvestite.
- Sweet November (2001) – Sara's two confidantes, Chaz and Brandon, are gay transvestites.
- Lilo & Stitch (2002) – Pleakley, a male alien who formerly served as an agent of the Galactic Federation, disguises himself as a woman when visiting Earth with his partner Dr. Jumba Jookiba.
- Boat Trip (2002) – Two straight men (Cuba Gooding Jr. and Horatio Sanz) mistakenly end up on gay cruise together and encounter the flamboyantly gay Hector (Maurice Godin) who introduces himself in drag as well as Tom (Ken Campbell) who cross-dresses regularly. There are also other instances of drag throughout the film.
- The Mudge Boy (2003) – Duncan Mudge (Emile Hirsch) wears his deceased mother's wedding dress.
- Pirates of the Caribbean: The Curse of the Black Pearl (2003) – Pintel and Ragetti disguise themselves as women while Hector Barbossa's skeleton crewmen attack the British ship, HMS Dauntless.
- Camp (2003) – One of the main characters, Michael, gets beaten up for wearing a dress, fishnet stockings, and high heels to his high school prom. Later on in the film, in his birthday party at camp, all his friends dress in drag as part of the celebration. Because of this, the camp director is on a crusade to be more like a normal summer camp.
- The Lord of the Rings: The Return of the King (2003) – Éowyn dresses as a soldier to be allowed to fight with the men.
- L'île de Black Mor (The Island of Black Mor) (2004) – In Jean-François Laguionie's motion picture, Petit Moine (Little Monk), captured by the pirates in a monastery, reveals to be a girl disguised as a boy, which leads to many arguments, since women on board are forbidden by pirate law.
- Rent (2005) – One of the main characters, Angel, is a drag queen.
- Robots (2005) – Fender (voiced by Robin Williams) slowly unleashes his cross-dressing tendencies.
- The Producers (2005) – The gay director, Roger De Bris, wears a dress when he is supposed to be Grand Duchess Anastasia.
- Offside (2006) – An Iranian girl disguises herself as a boy to go attend the 2006 World Cup qualifying match between Iran and Bahrain.
- Pirates of the Caribbean: Dead Man's Chest (2006) – Elizabeth Swann disguises herself as a man aboard the merchant vessel Edinburgh Trader and convinces the crew to sail for Tortuga. Jack Sparrow mistakes Elizabeth for a "lad" trying to join his crew aboard the Black Pearl.
- Stardust (2007) – Captain Shakespeare is a closeted cross-dresser.
- Molière (2007) – Monsieur Jourdain (Fabrice Luchini) secretly enters a high society salon in a woman's dress.
- The Gamers: Dorkness Rising (2008) – Director Matt Vancil is a male gamer rather unsuccessfully plays a female character.
- Rage (2009) – Jude Law plays Minx, a transvestite supermodel.
- District 13: Ultimatum (2009) – While undercover, Damien Tomaso (Cyril Raffaelli) dresses up as a girl to infiltrate the lair of mafia boss Monsieur Wu.
- The Disappearance of Haruhi Suzumiya (2010) - During the alternate universe sequence, Haruhi, who in this universe is a Kouyouen student, wears Kyon's tracksuit when disguising herself as a North High student.
- Denizen (2010) – The lead character (J.A. Steel) is a lesbian with a cross-dressing father, who is a general in the US Army.
- Pirates of the Caribbean: On Stranger Tides (2011) – Angelica disguises herself as Jack Sparrow in order to recruit a crew members as volunteers hoping to sail with Sparrow, eventually having Sparrow himself shang-hai'ed aboard Blackbeard's ship, Queen Anne's Revenge.
- J. Edgar (2011) – after his mother dies, Hoover is shown donning her dress and necklace
- Paddington (2014) – Henry Brown (Hugh Bonneville) dresses up as a cleaning lady to help Paddington get information from the archives.
- The Hobbit: The Battle of the Five Armies (2014) – Alfrid Lickspittle (Ryan Gage) dresses in women's clothes to save his life.
- Paddington 2 (2017) – Phoenix Buchanan (Hugh Grant) dresses up as a nun to sneak into St Paul's Cathedral.
- Ready Player One (2018) – Helen Harris (Lena Waithe), the lesbian African-American, plays a virtual reality OASIS as her male avatar named Aech, while appearing to be more masculine in real life.
- A Star is Born (2018) – The lead character, Ally (Lady Gaga), works as a performer at a drag club where she is discovered by Jackson Maine.
- Ratsasan (2018) – In a twist, main antagonist Christopher cross-dresses as his mother Mary Fernandez when abducting schoolgirls.
- The Beach Bum (2019) – The lead character, Moondog, disguises himself in women's clothing to escape discovery from the police.
- Rocko's Modern Life: Static Cling (2019) – Ralph Bighead (voiced by Joe Murray) is a transgender cane toad who transitions to a girl under the name Rachel.
- Enola Holmes (2020) – Running away from home, Enola Holmes (Millie Bobby Brown) dresses in the clothes of her brother Sherlock, posing as a young man.
- Sailor Moon Eternal (2021) – Hawk's Eye is one of the evil circus performers who pretends to be a female owner of the herb store so that he can lure Makoto Kino into a trap.
- Cruella (2021) – Cruella de Vil (Emma Stone) disguises herself as a male truck driver to break Jasper and Horace Badun (Joel Fry and Paul Walter Hauser) out of jail.
- The Bad Guys (2022) - In one of Wolf's attempt plans to get the Golden Dolphin as a trophy, Shark disguises himself as a woman for the gala, complete with a wig. Wolf later dresses as a grandmother as part of a lesson in good manners.
- The Super Mario Bros. Movie (2023) - In Bowser's wedding rehearsal, Kamek dresses up as Princess Peach.

=== Comedic element ===
In the documentary Giuliani Time there are excerpts from Rudy Giuliani's appearance in a video, which was shown for the occasion of an Inner Circle press dinner.

The 1936 Polish film Bohaterowie Sybiru has an episode where Polish insurgents exiled to Siberia are partying with Siberian peasants. Two Polish officers make a mock performance of a Polish folk dance, with one of them making a makeshift impersonation of a woman.

There are quite a few adaptations of the 1892 farce Charley's Aunt. In the original, a teenager impersonates his friend's aunt.

== Television ==
- Milton Berle was one of the most famous early cross-dressing comedians in skits and such on his NBC shows from 1948 to 1956.
- Harvey Korman played a Jewish mother character on The Carol Burnett Show
- Jonathan Winters had a popular female character, Maude Fricket.
- Flip Wilson created the memorable recurring character Geraldine Jones on The Flip Wilson Show.
- The first episode of the Blackadder II series ends with Blackadder's servant, Baldrick, acting as bridesmaid, and Lord Flashheart swapping clothes and running off with Blackadder's bride.
- Some other comedy sketch shows, such as Monty Python's Flying Circus, Little Britain, The League of Gentlemen, Saturday Night Live, The Kids in the Hall and French and Saunders.
- Australian male comedian Barry Humphries has appeared as Dame Edna in several shows.
- Eddie Izzard, a British stand-up comedian and actor, previously described herself as an "executive" or "action" transvestite, but now is transgender.
- The Monty Python troupe have been known to cross dress in their TV series and films. One set of characters are older women referred to by the troupe as "pepperpots", and one sketch in Monty Python's Flying Circus, "The Lumberjack Song", describes a lumberjack (Michael Palin) who likes to "put on women's clothing and hang around in bars."
- In Clue: The Musical, Mrs. White is usually played by a man.
- In all versions of Hairspray—the original film, the stage musical, and the film adapted from the musical—Edna Turnblad is played by a man.
- Michael Herbig and Rick Kavanian often played female characters in the sketch comedy show Bullyparade.
- On some plays and films by Tyler Perry, he dresses up as a woman to play as Madea.
- Meryl Streep played a male rabbi in an episode of Angels in America (2003).
- Michelle Ehlen plays a butch lesbian actress who gets cast as a man in a film in the comedic feature Butch Jamie (2007).
- In the 1992 Kannada movie Bombat Hendthi, a well-known male actor and dancer named Sridar crossdresses. His character and the character's friends want to rent a house, but the owners are not willing to rent to bachelors. So Sridhar crossdresses to become his friend's wife, while the rest of the actors (Sihi-kahi Chandru, Tennis Krishna, Ramesh Bhatt, Malashri and Anjali) are in supporting roles.
- Xing En is known for cross dressing in several Chinese TV series. One notable character is a man named Su Xingchen in Chinese Paladin 5 (2016), who is a sage of Mt Shu and good at strategy. Another notable character is Mo Ruofei in I Will Never Let You Go, who often disguised herself as a man and has very handsome look.
- Park Shin-hye plays a character Ko Mi-nyeo in the Korean TV series You're Beautiful (2009), who was asked to disguise herself as her twin brother Ko Mi-nam in order to help keep his place in the band A.N.JELL.

== Programs that feature drag ==
- Accused - In the episode "Tracie's Story", Sean Bean plays Simon, an English teacher, who by night cross-dresses as Tracie.
- Ask Harriet - Jack Cody (Anthony Tyler Quinn) a sexist sportswriter loses his job and has to dress up as his female alter ego named Sylvia Coco in order to get it back.
- ¿Algo que declarar? - translated as Anything/Something to Declare?, a Spain version of American dating game show Baggage hosted by Pablo Chiapella, one of the flight attendant uniform wearing male assistant can be seen wearing a pair of bright colored purple high heels like the three female flight attendant uniform wearing assistants.
- All in the Family featured female impersonator character "Beverley Lasalle" in later episodes
- 'Allo 'Allo! featuring cross-dressing in most episodes.
- The 1st Shop of Coffee Prince (2007) – The main character pretends to be a boy in order to obtain a job at a coffee shop that only hires men.
- Angry Boys (2011) - Chris Lilley cross-dresses as two characters, Ruth (Gran) Sims and Jen Okazaki in this Australian comedy show.
- Amazing Stories - In the episode "Welcome to My Nightmare", Harry, a teenage horror movie buff's obsession lands him in a terrifying scene from the classic Alfred Hitchcock film Psycho but with him in the role of Marion Crane.
- Are You Being Served? often features John Inman taking on female roles. Some of the other cast members such as Frank Thornton occasionally appear in drag as well.
- Arrested Development – Tobias Fünke (played by David Cross) disguises himself as a British nanny named Mrs. Featherbottom in order to maintain a relationship with his estranged family. (This is a direct reference to the film Mrs. Doubtfire). This development is an outcropping of the fact that, throughout the series, Tobias exhibits signs of being a latent homosexual.
- Baskets - Louie Anderson portrays Christine Baskets, the matriarch of a quirky family in Bakersfield, California.
- Baywatch Nights - Mitch Buchannon goes undercover as a female impersonator in the episode "Kind of a Drag".
- In Axis Powers: Hetalia, Poland cross-dresses as a hobby and has a "valley girl" accent.
- The Big Bang Theory – In the first two episodes of the series a cross-dresser is described as having occupied Apartment 4B prior to Penny. The character was not named or seen until a flashback scene in Season 3, Episode 22 when Leonard Hofstadter knocks on her apartment door and Louie/Louise, portrayed by Ajgie Kirkland en femme, directs Leonard to the "crazy guy across the hall" (Sheldon Cooper). Sheldon also dresses up as a french maid after losing a bet with Howard Wolowitz. The whole gang dress as female DC superheroes after losing a bet.
- Blackadder has several drag incidents.
  - In "Bells", Kate (Gabrielle Glaister) dresses up as "Bob" in order to earn money working as a valet for Lord Blackadder, who finds himself attracted to this young "boy", eventually discovering Kate's identity and arranging a marriage, in which Baldrick takes the role of a bridesmaid. Lord Flashheart interrupts and steals away "Bob", but not before exchanging clothing with her.
  - In "Chains", Prince Ludwig the Indestructible (Hugh Laurie) impersonates Queenie with a perfect disguise (really Laurie overdubbing Miranda Richardson).
  - In "Amy and Amiability" from Blackadder the Third, Amy Hardwood (Miranda Richardson) assumes the role of a highwayman in order to get money for her bankrupt father.
  - Kate returns in "Major Star" from Blackadder Goes Forth as Bob Parkhurst, driver for General Melchett. Also, Lieutenant George (Hugh Laurie in a different role) dresses in drag as "Georgina" for a music-hall show, put on to entertain the troops. He inadvertently draws the amorous attentions of Melchett. "Georgina" is only able to escape Melchett's efforts at marriage through a report from Captain Blackadder, that she wandered into no-man's land and trod on a cluster of landmines.
- Black Butler (2010) - In one episode Ciel dresses as a woman.
- Bosom Buddies – Tom Hanks and Peter Scolari star as two single men who must regularly disguise themselves as women, in order to live in a ladies-only hotel, the only apartment they can afford.
- Boston Legal character Clarence Bell is a transvestite client who came for legal help after being fired from his job. He later joined the firm as a legal assistant and eventually as a lawyer.
- Boy Meets World – Different characters cross-dress in later episodes.
- Briefgeheim - French teacher Ms. Tijnman is actually a man dressed as a woman.
- Bucket & Skinner's Epic Adventures (2011) in the episode "Epic Girls" Bucket and Skinner disguise themselves as girls in order to sneak into a party. They are also shown trying on different dresses.
- Chappelle's Show - in the skit "The World's Greatest War", a dead black gangsta can be seen wearing a blue high heel in a video.
- In the Cory in the House episode "That's So in the House", Corey poses as his sister Raven.
- In season 4 of Criminal Minds Jackson Rathbone plays a janitor at a hotel with split-personality disorder. The character, Adam, is a shy, abused, withdrawn young man. His alter-personality, is a strong, confident, southern women named Amanda. Adam/Amanda tries to kill his/her father because of all of the abuse suffered. Afterwards 'Amanda' becomes the dominant personality. At the end of the episode 'Amanda' is shown to have undergone a transformation, complete with make-up, a long curled wig, and pink clothing.
- Crusoe (2008) – A recurring character Oliver is revealed to actually be a woman named Olivia (played by Mía Maestro). Crusoe discovered her one-day when she was bathing for the first time on the island after being aboard the ship for so long. She pretends to be Oliver and helps the doctor for her personal safety from the male crew.
- In Cyberchase, Delete impersonates Motherboard with a wig and some makeup.
- Cybersix from the 1999 serial and the comic, dresses as a male teacher named Adrian Seidelman, in order to escape Von Richter (her creator).
- Cybill, in the episode "Cybill with an S", a hooker reveals herself as an undercover policeman, very brief in the beginning.
- Chihiro Fujisaki from Danganronpa cross-dresses as a female because of his deep insecurity about his weak physique, resorting to cross-dressing to hide his gender identity.
- Dårfinkar & dönickar – The main character Simone is mistaken for a boy on her first day at a new school when she does not correct her teacher for mispronouncing her name as Simon.
- Deal or No Deal – On the episode that aired on February 14, 2008, contestant Edward Tommasi wore heels and a dress to win a $10 bet.
- Dexter's Laboratory – Many episodes feature Dexter in drag. Examples being Dimwit Dexter, Remember Me?, and Tribe Called Girl.
- Doctor Who
  - In the 1966 story "The Highlanders" the second Doctor (Patrick Troughton) dresses as an old washerwoman as a ruse to try to find his companions in a crowded tavern in the aftermath of the Battle of Culloden.
  - In 1973 in "The Green Death" the third Doctor (Jon Pertwee) disguises himself as a cleaning lady to infiltrate Global Chemicals, where he engages in banter with the UNIT operative Mike Yates and refers to his plastic bucket as his 'handbag'. Both these interludes of 'cross-dressing' are played mainly for their comic value amid serious story-lines.
- On Dog Eat Dog, episodes 13 and 23 of the series saw the balance beam challenge of the show altered with the requirement that the contestant who participates in the challenge must wear six-inch high heels to walk across the beam. Both contestants who were selected to attempt the challenge were men and both failed to complete the challenge. Other episodes of the show saw contestants attempt to find the woman among a group of drag queens or to find the man among a group of drag kings, as well as a derivative of the former where a contestant has to find the bearded lady among a group of five individuals.
- Dragon Ball
  - In the episode "Oolong the Terrible" (in a scene adapted from the Dragon Ball manga's fifth chapter "Oo! Oo! Oolong, Bulma and Goku learn that a shapeshifter named Oolong has been kidnapping village girls to marry him. Bulma comes up with a plan to rescue the girls by tricking Oolong into taking Goku crossdressing as Pochawompa the next girl Oolong has his sights on. When Oolong first appears he is in the form of a red devil and tries to flirt with Goku who unfortunately has to take a leak though Oolong mistakenly assumes "she" is being shy and transforms into a handsome man causing Bulma leave her hiding place to woo him, while Goku takes the opportunity to relieve himself unfortunately Oolong notices and enraged turns into a bull though Goku responds by removing the dress and challenging Oolong to a fight.
  - In the episode "Look Out for Launch" (in a scene adapted from the Dragon Ball manga's twenty-seventh chapter "Nothing to Sneeze At"), in order to trick Good Launch into wearing pink frilled black lingerie leotard with matching leggings, Master Roshi convinces her and Goku (who is young and naive) that it is a training uniform with Master Roshi, Krillin, and Goku wearing identical lingerie as "training uniforms" so Launch won't suspect Roshi's real reason which is to see Launch in lingerie as he is an old lecher in addition to being a legendary martial artist. Unfortunately for Roshi, Launch's personality changes when she sneezes, going from her good and innocent persona to her tough gun-toting Bad Launch persona, who unlike her good persona quickly realizes what she's wearing and angrily pulls out an IMI Uzi to shoot at them in a comical fashion before sneezing again and returning to her Good Launch persona with neither Goku nor Good Launch realizing Master Roshi's deception due to their pure-hearted personalities.
- Dragon Ball GT
  - In the episode ″Trunks the Bride″ Trunks was forced to dress up as a bride to save a girl and planet's village after it was attacked by a monster named Zoonama who can create earthquakes. It was supposed to be Goku as the fake bride, but because he was too short to wear the dress he and Pan agreed on making him the fake bride.
  - In ″Whiskers of Power″ Trunks as Trunksette becomes the ″bride″ for Zoonama as he is taken to Soonama's lair while there Goku, Pan, and Doma, the bride's fińacee, try to cut Zoonama's whiskers as he drinks a potion to knock him out, they only cut one and he wakes up! With Pan finding out that Zoonama can only predict earthquakes and not make them, Zoonama's lair, really a volcano, burst in to flames as Goku blast it with his Kamehameha destroying it as the episode ends with Goku, Pan, and a happy-to-be-out-that-dress Trunks is given a dragon ball though someone steals it.
- El Hazard – Makoto Mizuhara impersonates Princess Fatora of Roshtaria who is kidnapped by the Phantom Tribe because of his uncanny resemblance to the princess.
- The Drew Carey Show – Drew's brother, Steve Carey, is a cross-dresser.
- The Famous Five TV series
  - The Famous Five (1978) - Georgiana wears boy's clothes, prefers to be called "George" and is pleased to be mistaken for a boy.
  - The Famous Five (1996)
- Fetch! with Ruff Ruffman – A Children's game show on PBS Kids Go! Some episodes have boys dressing up in female outfits. Jay in Season 3 wore a cheerleading outfit (but it had shorts) in the episode "The Ol' Switcheroo". In the episode "Will they Like the Show? It's a Shoe-In!" featured boys playing basketball in high heels, and in the episode of Season 4 called "Is it a Bird? Is it a Plane? It's...Ruffmanman!", Brian was with Bethany as part of the "Indestructible Butterflies"
- Firefly – Mal Reynolds (played by Nathan Fillion) wears a dress and a bonnet as a disguise while saving a town from bandits. He is later asked about this, and his response indicates that he has cross-dressed in the past.
- The Flip Wilson Show (1970) - Flip Wilson plays Geraldine Jones as a recurring character in this sketch variety series.
- Friends – Chandler's father (played by Kathleen Turner) is a cross-dresser.
- Fruits Basket – Ritsu Sohma dresses as female, because it makes him feel more confident, and comfortable. His cousins Ayame Sohma and his younger brother, Yuki occasionally cross-dress because they look good in female clothing. With the former it's voluntary, the latter less so.
- Fushigi Yuugi – Nuriko, one of the Suzaku Seven Celestial Warriors, dresses as a woman in memory of his dead sister. In the middle of the manga series, the Suzaku Warriors had had to dress up as women to avoid being killed in the island of Nyousei, where barbaric, cannibalistic, anti-masculinist women lived. This idea is excluded from the anime series, but revived in the omake.
- Futari wa Pretty Cure – In one episode, Nagisa Misumi disguises herself as a man twice in an attempt to reclaim Mepple, who had been confiscated. In a later episode, Nagisa plays the part of Romeo in Verone Academy's school play of Romeo and Juliet.
- In Game of Thrones, Arya Stark is a tomboy who prefers more masculine activities such as sword fighting instead of the more feminine activities like embroidery. After her father is arrested and executed she assumes the identity of a boy named "Arry" and tries to return to her family.
- In the anime Genesis Climber MOSPEADA (also known as the New Generation segment of Robotech) the character of Yellow Belmont/Lancer cross-dresses as a means of disguise, as well as to perform in his rock singer identity (known as Yellow Dancer in Robotech).
- Gintama - In Episode 24 Gintoki and Katsura are wearing female kimono as Piko and Zuka.
- Glee – In Season 3, episode 16 ("Saturday Night Glee-ver"), actor Alex Newell portrays Wade Adams, a member of rival glee club Vocal Adrenaline, who performs as his transgender alter ego "Unique". In Season 4, Wade/Unique becomes a recurrent character.
- Golden Girls – Dorothy Zbronak's (Beatrice Arthur) brother Phil Petrillo, who was never seen on air, is a cross-dresser. When he died in the episode Ebbtide's Revenge, Phil's widow Angela had him buried in a teddy, to which Dorothy said to her roommates "it looks like he died in a Benny Hill sketch!".
- Gravitation – The main character, Shuichi Shindou, wears his sister's schoolgirl uniform and dons a maid outfit to try to get the attention of Eiri Yuki.
- H2O: Footprints in the Sand (2008) - Hamaji Yakumo is a boy who cross-dresses as a girl.
- Hana-Kimi (1997–2004) - The manga series centers on Mizuki Ashiya, a Japanese girl who lives in the United States. One day, she sees a track and field competition on TV, and becomes attracted to one of the high jump competitors, Izumi Sano. She begins to idolize the young athlete and eventually transfers to Japan to attend the same school that Sano attends. There is a catch, however: Sano attends an all-boys high school, named Osaka Gakuen and Mizuki must disguise herself as a boy to enter. It has been adapted into four drama shows: Hanazakarino Kimitachihe (Taiwan), Hanazakari no Kimitachi e (Japan), Hanazakari no Kimitachi e (Japan) and To the Beautiful You (Korea).
- Happiness! (2006) - A secondary character of the series, Jun Watarase, is a boy who dresses as a girl.
- HeartCatch PreCure - For the first half of the series, Itsuki Myoudouin cross-dresses as a boy because her brother is too ill to be heir of their dojo.
- Heaven's Lost Property - In episode 11, Sugata dresses like a long-haired woman while Mikako dresses like a man. Also, Tomoki is transformed into a girl called "Tomoko".
- He's a Lady – The 2004 reality television series involves male contestants competing with each other to act as effeminately as possible, including cross-dressing.
- Hikari Sentai Maskman – Princess Igam (Mina Asami) has been raised as a man so that she could one day take the imperial throne.
- Himegoto (2014) – The protagonist, Hime Arikawa, dresses as a girl.
- Hollyoaks character Kris Fisher is a cross-dresser.
- I My Me! Strawberry Eggs – Main character Hibiki Amawa disguises himself as a woman to obtain a job as a gym teacher at school that will only hire women.
- iCarly – In the episode "iWant My Website Back", Spencer dressed as an old lady to fool Nevel into giving iCarly their URL back, but instead, he attracted an old man.
- InuYasha – Jakotsu of the Band of Seven always wears women's clothes and repeatedly flirts with Inuyasha.
- Invader Zim – In the episode "Walk for your Lives", Zim uses a fat lady disguise to get rid of an explosion that is exploding really really slowly.
- In the British TV sitcom Keeping Up Appearances Hyacinth's brother-in-law Bruce is a cross-dresser which Hyacinth tries not to let people find out about. In several episodes one can see Bruce in his outfits.
- Kenny vs. Spenny - In the episode, "Who Makes the Most Convincing Woman?", Kenny Hotz & Spencer Rice in full drag, host a ladies-night-out cocktail party at the house. The real women will choose which one has transformed himself into the most convincing woman: Kendra (Hotz), the slutty party girl or Spennita (Rice), the career woman who wants it all.
- The King's Affection – Main character is a Joseon royal princess posing as her dead twin brother – the Crown Prince.
- Goretti from Killinaskully was played by actor Pat Shortt.
- Various characters from Kuroshitsuji including main character Ciel Phantomhive and Grell Sutcliff cros-dress in some episodes and the OVAs.
- Leonardo – Lisa disguises herself as a boy named Tomaso so she may study art under Andrea del Verrocchio.
- Love in the Moonlight - A 19th-century Korean girl dressed as a boy and eventually becomes a eunuch.
- Louder with Crowder (2017) - US political commentator Steven Crowder has a regular segment in which he cross-dresses for comedic effect.
- The Loud House – Lincoln dresses up as a girl like in episodes like "Overnight Success", "A Novel Idea" and "Cover Girls".
- Maid Sama! – Aoi Hyoudou, an internet celebrity, cross-dresses so he won't be made fun of for liking cute, girl things.
- Maria Holic – Mariya Shidō is a boy who cross-dresses as a girl.
- M*A*S*H – Maxwell Klinger (Jamie Farr) regularly cross-dresses as part of a futile attempt to be dismissed from the military.
- Master of None – Lena Waithe's character Denise is a lesbian woman who poses as a hippie man. In Season 3, Denise is married to Alicia (Naomi Ackie).
- McHale's Navy – Whenever McHale and/or his crew have to disguise themselves in order to carry out one of their elaborate schemes, it's usually Tinker (Billy Sands) or Ensign Parker (Tim Conway) who has to dress up as a woman.
- MegaMan NT Warrior (Rockman.EXE) – Villain Magnus Gauss (Gauss Magnets) cross-dresses as a woman and is obsessed with Dr. Wily. In one episode (unaired in the dub), three of the main characters cross-dress as idol singer Aki-chan to rescue a group of kidnapped girls.
- In Merlin's Apprentice a young girl Brianna disguises herself as a male squire in order to avenge her family's loss of land.
- "Written in Blood", the second episode of crime drama Midsomer Murders, features a cross-dressing victim.
- Rich Fulcher plays a woman named Eleanor in the Season 3 episode "Eels" of the British comedy show The Mighty Boosh. He continues to dress as Eleanor for stand-up comedy gigs, and refers to her as a separate person from himself. In the season 2 episode "Nanageddon", main characters Howard Moon (Julian Barratt) and Vince Noir (Noel Fielding) dress as nanas in order to sneak into a bingo game and find the elusive demon, Nanatoo.
- Minami-ke – Makoto regularly cross-dresses as Mako-chan to get close a girl he likes. Another character, Tōma, is a tomboy with three older brothers who regularly wears male clothing.
- Mission: Impossible - In the fourth season episode, "Gitano", Paris (Leonard Nimoy) and Zorka (Margarita Cordova) disguise King Victor (Barry Williams) as a Gitano girl in order for him to not get spotted by Colonel Moya and his guards.
- Mobile Suit Gundam 00 – Gundam pilot Tieria Erde cross-dresses in the second season in order to gain entrance to a party.
- Mobile Suit Gundam ZZ – Gundam pilot Judau Ashta cross-dresses in the second season to free his female companions from a harem
- Along with the members of Monty Python's Flying Circus dressing up as women for comedic purposes, Monty Python featured a sketch called "The Lumberjack Song", about a lumberjack who likes to "put on women's clothing and hang around in bars."
- Mr. Headmistress – TV movie – Ex-con Harland Williams disguises himself as the new Headmistress of an all-girl school to avoid some thugs.
- Murder, She Wrote – The episode "Birds of a Feather" features two drag queens. Also in "Amsterdam Kill", there is a woman disguised as a man and there is another in done of the episodes set in Ireland.
- My Little Pony: Friendship Is Magic – In the episode called "Brotherhooves Social", Big MacIntosh is disguised as a mare named Orchard Blossom with a blond wig and a blue dress complete with pink makeup and fake eyelashes.
- My Partner Knows Best - On the April 25, 2018 episode, the husband contestants were forced to run an obstacle course in high heels and subjected themselves to a full body wax.
- Nail Shop Paris – An author tries to break out of her writer's block by disguising herself as a boy so she can base her next novel on a nail salon staffed only by men.
- In The Nick Cannon Show Nick dresses like a woman in 6 episodes.
- Otoboku – Mizuho Miyanokoji cross-dresses to attend a girls' school as per his grandfather's wishes.
- On Our Own – the oldest brother of an orphaned family cross-dresses, pretending to be an older aunt, to keep his family together until he is legally of age. Features the Smollett family.
- One Piece – A Japanese anime and a manga about pirates includes a number of cross-dressing characters, the okamas. The most notable of them are Mr. 2 (a.k.a.Bon Clay) who can change his physical appearance and Emporio Ivankov, a queen of a drag queen kingdom, who can change his sex by controlling the hormones (and strongly resembles Tim Curry's Dr. Frank-N-Furter from The Rocky Horror Picture Show).
- One Well-Raised Daughter - In this South Korean serial drama, the main protagonist, a female has to dress like a boy in order to inherit her family's Soy Sauce business in order to keep it out of the hands of a scheming woman and a competing company. Although she is outed after she succeeds, she exacts revenge on them upon learning their plans to take over the business.
- Opposite Sex – In the pilot episode, the first three boys (Milo Ventimiglia, Kyle Howard and Chris Evans) in a formerly all-girls school do a drag routine in the schools annual talent show.
- Otome wa Boku ni Koishiteru – The main character of the series, Mizuho Miyanokouji, is a boy who cross-dresses as a girl.
- Ouran High School Host Club – Main character Haruhi Fujioka cross-dresses regularly and is initially mistaken as male by the members of the Host Club. Also, various Host Club members cross-dress on occasion, including manga episodes 10 (Hikaru, Kaoru, and Hunny as part of a plan to keep Haruhi away from Saint Lobelia's Zuka Club, and in the anime adaptation, Tamaki and Kyoya also cross-dress for the same reason), 11 (Hikaru and Kaoru take turns dressing as the witch of the central wing), 15 (Hikaru, Kaoru, Tamaki, and Mori all dress in Alice costumes, and Kyoya portrays the Black Queen as well as Alice's mother in this chapter), and 20 (Hunny while going undercover with the Host Club to monitor Haruhi and Hikaru's date).
- Perfect Strangers Larry dresses up as a woman in the episode Just a Gigolo.
- Pink Is In, a Canadian comedy series that airs on Tubi in the US, features an actor in drag playing the character of Ruby, an inmate at a women's prison.
- Pokémon – James from Team Rocket, often appears in a dress or skirt, and in one of the banned episodes, he is even seen in a bikini complete with inflatable breasts. A partial list of characters including Ash Ketchum (three times), and Jessie and Meowth of Team Rocket, have also been known to cross-dress, although not as often as James. One of Misty's older sisters dress up as a prince and Gastly also once disguised as a beautiful maiden and an old woman at a summer festival.
- The Powerpuff Girls – Bubbles disguises herself as one of the Rowdyruff Boys, Boomer, to go undercover and track down his brothers, Brick and Butch. Professor Utonium also disguises himself as a woman in another episode.
- Princess Knight – Princess Sapphire disguises herself like a man to fight in her adventures.
- Princess Princess – Three students in an all-male school dress as girls to raise the spirits of the other students.
- Queer as Folk – Melanie Marcus (Michelle Clunie), the lesbian attorney/lawyer, embodies more masculine traits such as in "The Wedding" where she wears a tuxedo as a bridegroom to marry her partner Lindsay Peterson (Thea Gill).
- Robin Hood – Djaq (played by Anjali Jay) is a Saracen who true name is Saffiya, but she disguises herself as a boy by adopting her dead twin brother's name and appearance.
- In the Round the Twist episode "Lucky Lips", Pete is given a magical lipstick by a mysterious fortune teller that would make any female unable to resist kissing him. In the episode "Know All", Tony ends up being dressed as a fortune teller.
- Ramen Fighter Miki – Episode 10 Part 1 includes a scene where Kankuro is wearing Miki's outfit while trying to beat her at her own game (that being ramen delivery). Then at the end of Episode 12 Part 1, he dons the disguise of an aristocratic lady to try to get Miki to challenge him.
- Ranma ½ – A Japanese anime about a martial artist called Ranma who can transform into a girl. His gender is easily changed through means not under his control, so a costume which works on one gender often suddenly and comically becomes inappropriate cross-dressing. Also appearing in the anime and manga are Tsubasa Kurenai and Konatsu, who are male cross-dressers, and Ukyo Kuonji, a female cross-dresser and potential love interest of the gender-changing Ranma.
- The Riches – Sam Malloy (Aidan Mitchell), the youngest son of an Irish-American Traveller family, prefers cross-dressing. Even though under certain circumstances Sam can wear boys' clothes, he occasionally reverts to girls' clothing, much to the embarrassment of his family. (The Riches also features Eddie Izzard portraying Sam's non-transvestite dad, Wayne Malloy.)
- The Rose of Versailles – Oscar François de Jarjayes, the main character of the series, is a woman who was raised as a boy and who cross-dresses as a man.
- RuPaul's Drag Race – a competition reality show premised around Drag Queens, men who cross-dress professionally as a means of entertainment. The show gives a deeper side to the art of female impersonation, as well as insight into the world of a gay drag artist.
- Sailor Moon – In one episode of the first season, Zoisite (one of the villains) disguises himself as Sailor Moon. In both "Sailor Moon S" and "Sailor Stars" seasons, Haruka Tenou (Sailor Uranus) wears masculine clothes most of the time, and even chooses to wear the masculine version of her school uniform, to the point of being mistaken for a boy by other characters. In the "Sailor Moon Super S" season, Fish-Eye always dresses like a woman. In "Sailor Stars", male pop idols Seiya, Taiki, and Yaten transform into the female Sailor Starlights.
- Samantha oups! – French comedy series starring two men who portray themselves as women—Samantha (played by David Strajmayster) and Chantal (Guillaume Carcaud).
- Sasameki Koto – Masaki Akemiya is a boy who cross-dresses as a girl.
- Saved by the Bell – Zach and Screech occasionally dress as women either to disguise themselves or for comic effect.
- SheeZaam - A cartoon pilot about a male sanitation worker who gains a magical ring that grants him superpowers, but since the ring is intended only for a woman, his superhero form is cross-dressed.
- SheZow — A cartoon about a preteen boy who gains a magical ring that grants him superpowers, but since the ring is intended only for a girl, his superhero form is cross-dressed.
- In Shin Hakkenden Rei Yozora, one of the main characters, is so convincing in her crossdressing that Kou and Tomoka are bewildered when they found out she was a woman in the end.
- In the Silver Spoons episode "The Most Beautiful Girl in the World", Ricky (Ricky Schroder) is convinced to dress up in drag and be a friend's date for a dance because his friend saved Ricky from an almost fatal accident previously.
- In The Simpsons episode "Girls Just Want to Have Sums", Lisa Simpson disguises herself as a boy named Jake Boyman in order to learn math when the school is segregated by gender. Bart has also worn girls' clothes on several occasions, sometimes by choice, and sometimes against his will.
- Something in the Air – Features a cross-dressing politician, Doug Rutherford (played by Roger Oakley).
- SpongeBob SquarePants – SpongeBob has dressed like a woman in several episodes. His best friend Patrick Star cross-dresses in order to protect himself from what he thinks is an assassin in the episode "That's No Lady".
- Star Trek: Deep Space Nine has on several occasions featured characters cross-dressing. In "Profit and Lace", the character Quark dresses as a woman to prevent an enemy of his to ascend to the power of Grand Nagus. In another Ferengi-related episode, "Rules of Acquisition", a female Ferengi cross-dresses because females are not permitted to earn profit in the Ferengi culture. "Rules of Acquisition" is also one of the few episodes that references how the Federation views homosexuality when the character Dax discusses that it's a normal thing for a man to be in love with another man (She doesn't know that the man she is chatting with at the time is really a woman, cross-dressed).
- On The Suite Life on Deck, Bailey pretended to be a boy so she could attend Seven Seas High on the SS Tipton because all of the girls rooms were taken. She becomes Zack's roommate and he agrees to keep it a secret. It is quickly found that Bailey is actually a girl and she ends up rooming with London.
- The Suite Life of Zack & Cody - Both Zack and Cody (played by real-life twins Cole and Dylan Sprouse) cross-dress in several episodes for numerous reasons; one most notably being Cody entering a beauty pageant for young girls while Zack approves of it because the first prize is a new bike.
- Summer Heights High – Chris Lilley cross-dresses for the character of Ja'mie King in this Australian comedy; she is often seen wearing a green school dress.
- Sungkyunkwan Scandal – In 18th century Korea, a young girl dresses as a boy so she can attend a prestigious school and earn money to support her impoverished family.
- The Jeffersons – George's navy buddy Eddie (Edie) Stokes and employee Leroy cross-dress to fool Louise when George can't find the real Eddie .
- Three's Company – Jack Tripper (played by John Ritter) dresses up as a woman in two episodes. Larry Dallas (played by Richard Kline) also dresses up as a woman in one episode.
- Tipping the Velvet – A coming of age story about a young woman named Nan (Rachael Stirling) who falls in love with a male impersonator.
- Together – Singaporean drama which in episode 10, Yao Wuji (Zhang Zhen Huan) was asked to cross-dress as part of his job of being an Ah Gua (a man who acts like a woman) which made his father (Wang Yuqing) to nearly kill him by constantly beating him. He was also seen cross-dressing in episode 9.
- Twin Peaks – The character Catherine Martell (Piper Laurie) disguises as Japanese investor Mr. Tojamura, Denise/Dennis Bryson (David Duchovny) is a male character who wears women's clothes because it relaxes him, and at one point Windom Earle (Kenneth Welsh) impersonates the Log Lady.
- The Ugliest Girl in Town – sitcom about a male American actor who accepts a female modeling job in London to be with his girlfriend.
- Uh Oh! - During episode 74 of the first season, a part of the Slime Tour obstacle course race that took place in Victoria, British Columbia included an obstacle where the three participants had to first put on ball gowns à la Queen Victoria before moving on to the next obstacle; one of the children in the race was a boy named "Rad" Rhys. A variety of other obstacle courses of the Slime Tour that aired on different episodes of Uh Oh! included requirements for contestants to don dresses before proceeding onwards with the course, and many of the contestants in those courses were boys. The organizer of the Slime Tour, "Slime Master" Shaun Majumder (and later, Ryan Belleville), has also occasionally dressed as a woman at times when introducing some of the different obstacle courses of the Slime Tour.
- Victorious - in the episode "Beck Falls for Tori" Beck disguises as Tori in or to do the stunt.
- We Can Be Heroes (2005) - Chris Lilley cross-dresses for two characters, Pat Mullins and Ja'mie King in this Australian mockumentary, the first show that Lilley created.
- Work It – American television sitcom about two men who must dress as women in order to keep a job in a bad economy.
- World Wrestling Entertainment wrestler Dustin Rhodes portrayed "Goldust", a gimmick that involved cross-dressing as well as former wrestler Vito LoGrasso, who later gained the nickname "The Toughest Man To Ever Wear A Dress". Tyler Breeze's "Fashion Police" gimmick alongside Fandango also involved cross-dressing. Numerous other male wrestlers in various promotions have also donned women's clothing as a punishment for losing a match over the years such as Brian Pillman and Perry Saturn.
- Young Americans TV series in which one of the female characters poses as a boy.
- You Can't Do That on Television – Several comedy sketches, particularly in the early years, featured boys in the cast wearing dresses for various reasons.
- You Rang, M'Lord? – Cissy is a lesbian cross-dresser, complete with monocle, cravat and short hair.
- You're Beautiful – A young nun cross-dresses as a boy to impersonate her brother in a boy band. You're Beautiful was remade into the 2013 Taiwanese series Fabulous Boys.
- Zoey 101 – In one episode of this show Lola disguises herself as a boy to prove boys can still act the same if a girl is around.
- In Zoids: Chaotic Century episode 28 "Run, Wolf!" Prince Rudolph Zeppelin III is disguised as a girl in order to hide his identity.

=== Animation, cartoons and anime ===
- Bugs Bunny frequently cross-dresses in his cartoons for either comedic effect, or to confound a male opponent. Notable examples include "Rabbit of Seville", "What's Opera Doc" and "Rabbit Seasoning", all in attempts to deceive Elmer Fudd.
- Doctor N. Gin from the Crash Bandicoot series wears a ballerina dancer outfit in Crash Tag Team Racing. The tutu, obtained through one of Crash's missions, is an alternative costume that made N. Gin feel "pretty" and boosted his self-esteem.
- Him from The Powerpuff Girls series is shown every time, wearing a typical skirt, fishnet stockings, and high-heeled boots.
- Jessie and James from Pokémon cross-dress as ballet performers and wedding couples.
- In the manga and anime Ouran High School Host Club, the main character of Haruhi Fujioka cross-dresses as a boy so that she can work in a host club to pay off a debt she owes to the other members. Haruhi's father, Ranka, is also a cross-dresser.
- In the manga and live-action series of Hana-Kimi (Hanazakari no Kimitachi e), the main character, Mizuki Ashiya, cross-dresses as a boy to attend an all-boys boarding school to meet her idol, Izumi Sano.
- In the manga and anime Shugo Chara!, Nagihiko Fujisaki cross-dresses as his "twin" Nadeshiko out of family tradition. He also cross-dresses in his transformation Yamato Maihime.
- In the manga and anime Mermaid Melody Pichi Pichi Pitch Pure, one of Michel's servants named Lady Bat, who cross-dresses as a female, is actually a male.
- In the anime and manga Hetalia: Axis Powers, Poland is a man and dresses like a woman sometimes.
- In the anime Himegoto, the main character, Hime Arikawa, cross-dresses to join the Student Council who promises to pay off the debt created by Hime's parents. There are also four other characters who cross-dress, including Hime's brother, Kaguya, HIro Toyotomi, No. 1, and Mitsunaga Oda, all of whom are against the Student Council.

== See also ==
- Cross-dressing in literature
- Cross-gender acting
- List of transgender-related topics
- Transgender in film and television
