= S&M Sally =

- Directed by: Michelle Ehlen
- Written by: Michelle Ehlen
- Produced by: David Au, Charlie Vaughn
- Starring: Jen McPherson; Michelle Ehlen; Shaela Cook
- Cinematography: Olivia Kuan
- Edited by: Michelle Ehlen
- Music by: Johnny Harris, Random Order
- Production company: Ballet Diesel Films
- Distributed by: Ariztical Entertainment
- Release date: June 2015
- Running time: 80 minutes
- Country: United States
- Language: English
- Budget: $30,000 (Approx.)

S&M Sally is a 2015 American comedy-romance film directed by Michelle Ehlen. It stars Jen McPherson, Michelle Ehlen and Shaela Cook. This is the third installment of the "Butch Jamie" series and follows the relationship of the characters Jamie & Jill.

The screenplay by Michelle Ehlen talks about a lesbian couple Jamie and Jill exploring the underground world of S&M while their friends David and Lola compete to see who is cool enough to go through with a threesome.

== Plot ==
When Jamie finds out her girlfriend Jill has spent time exploring BDSM, her insecurities about falling behind in the bedroom push her to propose that they start going to underground clubs. Jamie decides to use the pseudonym Sally so she can stay anonymous but still look like she is using her real name, which apparently she thinks makes her look cool. Identifying as the butch one in a traditional butch/femme couple, "Sally" assumes she will take the dominant role in their escapades, with Jill as her submissive, but Jill has ideas of her own.

== Cast ==
- Jen McPherson as Jill
- Michelle Ehlen as Jamie
- Shaela Cook as Lola
- Scott Keiji Takeda as David
- Adrian Gonzalez as Sebastian
- Dolly Grey as Melina
- Christopher Callen as Mistress Chyenne
- Shaun Laundry as Princess

== Production ==
Michelle Ehlen raised funds on Kickstarter and the whole production worked under micro-budget. The unused funds were donated through this campaign to the L.A. LGBT Center

The film was shot on location in Los Angeles, California, US.

=== Principal production credits ===
- Producers ..... David Au, Charlie Vaughn
- Original Music ..... Johnny Harris
- Cinematography ..... Olivia Kuan
- Production Design ..... David Monster
- Make-Up Department ..... Crystal Nardico
- Film Editor ..... Michelle Ehlen

== Soundtrack ==
The film features a whole score composed by Johnny Harris plus the following tracks:

- "Black Lipstick Kiss"

Written by: 'Lynx Dean'. Performed by: 'Random Order'. (Best Song In Film Award: Won)

- "Death To Vanilla Sex"

Written by: 'Count Boogie'. Performed by: 'Count Boogie'.

- "Radioactive"

Written by: 'Kiirstin Marilyn'. Performed by: 'Kiirstin Marilyn'.

== Critical reception ==
The Independent Critic said the film "I loved S&M Sally... A delightfully entertaining and awesomely kinky romp through flogging, electric play, fire play, and life in the dungeon snack room, S&M Sally is about 100 times more entertaining and authentic than the straighter yet far more awkwardly awful 50 Shades drivel."

Dr. Patti Britton posted on Facebook "I highly recommend this film, "S&M Sally" on #BDSM for all sex coaches and sexologists".

"The Curve Magazine" wrote "It's a funny, sexy, genuine romp with minimal gayngst and lots of representation".

=== Awards and nominations ===
Award wins:

- Jury Award (Special Mention) - International Gay & Lesbian Film Festival, Barcelona, Spain.
- QAward (Best Comedic Feature) - International Gay & Lesbian Film Festival, Fort Worth, TX, USA.
- Jury Prize (Best Feature) - International Gay & Lesbian Film Festival, Philadelphia, USA.
- Audience Award (Best Feature) - International Gay & Lesbian Film Festival, Sacramento, CA, USA.
- Audience Award - Kaleidoscope, The Little Rock LGBT Film Festival, Arkansas, USA.
- Audience Award - Out Film CT, LGBT Film Festival, Connecticut, USA.
- Best Screenplay - QFilms, Long Beach, CA, USA.
- Director's Award - Out Film CT, LGBT Film Festival, Connecticut, USA.
- Best Song "Black Lipstick Kiss" - 'Random Order' for the song (written by Lynx Dean), Fetisch Film Festival, Kiel, Germany
