= Lya Ley =

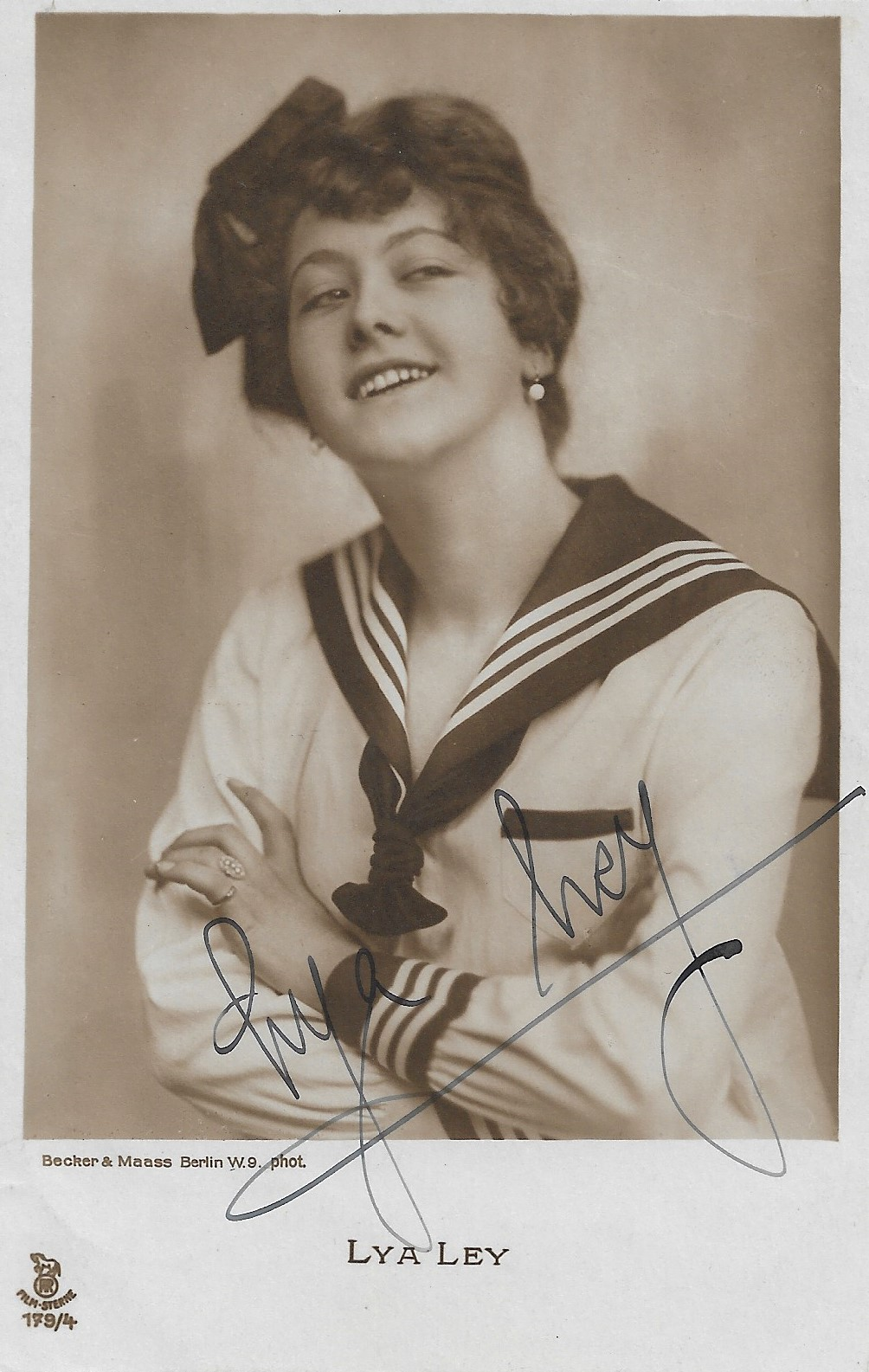
- Born: 19 October 1899; Troppau, Silesia, Austro-Hungarian Empire
- Died: 1992 (aged 92–93); Munich, Bavaria, Germany
- Occupation: Actress
- Years active: 1916–1921 (film)

Lya Ley (1899–1992) was an Austrian-born film actress of the silent era. She was built up into a star by the director Franz Hofer.

== Selected filmography ==
- Rose on the Heath (1916)
- Der Verheiratete Junggeselle (1918)
- Hängezöpfchen (1919)
- Der Christus von Oberammergau (1921)

== Bibliography ==
- Bock, Hans-Michael & Bergfelder, Tim. The Concise CineGraph. Encyclopedia of German Cinema. Berghahn Books, 2009.
