= Cry for Help (film) =

1928 film by Franz Hofer

- Directed by: Franz Hofer
- Written by: Franz Hofer
- Produced by: Lotte Dietrich
- Starring: Hans Mierendorff; John Mylong; Franz Verdier
- Cinematography: A. O. Weitzenberg
- Production company: Filmfabrikation und Vertrieb
- Distributed by: Rex-Atelier
- Release date: 8 June 1928
- Country: Germany
- Languages: Silent; German intertitles

Cry for Help or Cry for Help Behind Bars (German: Notschrei hinter Gittern) is a 1928 German silent drama film directed by Franz Hofer and starring Hans Mierendorff, John Mylong, and Franz Verdier.

== Cast ==
- Hans Mierendorff
- John Mylong
- Franz Verdier
- Andreas Van Horn
- Karl Harbacher
- Theodor Loos
- Hilde Maroff
- Eugen Rex
- Gerdi Gerdt
- Hermann Picha
- Karl Platen
- Max Maximilian

== Bibliography ==
- Grange, William (2008). Cultural Chronicle of the Weimar Republic. Lanham, MD: Scarecrow Press. ISBN 978-0-8108-5967-8.
