= Black Earth (film) =

1923 film by Franz Hofer

- Directed by: Franz Hofer
- Written by: Franz Hofer
- Produced by: Franz Hofer
- Starring: Loni Nest; Fritz Schroeter; Anna von Palen
- Cinematography: Hermann Schadock
- Edited by: Franz Hofer
- Production company: Hofer-Film
- Release date: 4 April 1923
- Country: Germany
- Languages: Silent; German intertitles

Black Earth (German: Schwarze Erde) is a 1923 German silent film directed by Franz Hofer and starring Loni Nest, Fritz Schroeter, and Anna von Palen.

The film's sets were designed by the art director Fritz Willi Krohn.

== Cast ==
- Loni Nest
- Fritz Schroeter
- Anna von Palen
- Max Lehmann
- Hermann Picha
- Yty Chong
- Billy Hofer
- Perry Kay

== Bibliography ==
- Bock, Hans-Michael; Bergfelder, Tim, eds. (2009). The Concise Cinegraph: Encyclopaedia of German Cinema. New York: Berghahn Books. ISBN 978-1-57181-655-9.
