= Madame Lu =

1929 film

- Directed by: Franz Hofer
- Written by: Franz Hofer
- Produced by: Lotte Dietrich
- Starring: Ida Wüst; Gerdi Gerdt; Hans Mierendorff
- Cinematography: A.O. Weitzenberg
- Distributed by: Hegewald Film
- Release date: 27 September 1929
- Country: Germany
- Languages: Silent; German intertitles

Madame Lu or Madame Lu, the Woman for Discreet Advice (German: Madame Lu, die Frau für diskrete Beratung) is a 1929 German silent film directed by Franz Hofer and starring Ida Wüst, Gerdi Gerdt and Hans Mierendorff.

The film's art direction was by Leopold Blonder.

== Cast ==
- Ida Wüst as Madame Lu
- Gerdi Gerdt as The girl
- Hans Mierendorff
- Eva Speyer
- Robert Thiem
- Rudolf Lettinger
- Sybill Morel
- Karl Platen
- Leo Peukert
- Antonie Jaeckel
- Sophie Pagay
- Maria Forescu as Abortionist
- Trude Lehmann

== Bibliography ==
- Bock, Hans-Michael & Bergfelder, Tim. The Concise CineGraph. Encyclopedia of German Cinema. Berghahn Books, 2009.
