= Fritz Achterberg =

German actor (1880–1971)

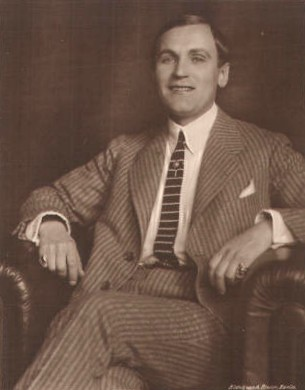
- Born: Fritz Karl Walther Achterberg; 2 November 1880; Berlin, German Empire
- Died: 12 October 1971 (aged 90); Weimar, East Germany
- Resting place: Parkfriedhof Lichterfelde, Berlin, Germany
- Occupation: Actor
- Years active: 1910–1945

Fritz Achterberg (2 November 1880 – 12 October 1971) was a German stage and film actor.

== Selected filmography ==
- Rose on the Heath (1916)
- Augen (1919)
- The Swabian Maiden (1919)
- Anna Karenina (1919)
- Bettler GmbH (1919)
- Telephon 1313 (1921)
- Hamlet (1921)
- The False Dimitri (1922)
- The Doll Maker of Kiang-Ning (1923)

== Bibliography ==
- Jung, Uli & Schatzberg, Walter. Beyond Caligari: The Films of Robert Wiene. Berghahn Books, 1999.
