= Miss Piccolo =

1914 film by Franz Hofer

- Directed by: Franz Hofer
- Written by: Franz Hofer
- Produced by: Max Maschke
- Starring: Dorrit Weixler; Ernst Lubitsch; Alice Hechy
- Cinematography: Gotthardt Wolf
- Production company: Luna-Film
- Release date: June 1914
- Running time: 40 minutes
- Country: Germany
- Languages: Silent; German intertitles

Miss Piccolo (German: Fräulein Piccolo) is a 1914 German silent comedy film directed by Franz Hofer and starring Dorrit Weixler, Ernst Lubitsch and Alice Hechy.

The film's sets were designed by the art director Fritz Kraenke.

== Cast ==
- Dorrit Weixler as Lo - Fräulein Piccolo
- Ernst Lubitsch as Pinkeles
- Franz Schwaiger as Leutnant Clairon
- Alice Hechy as Röschen
- Max Lehmann as Los Vater
- Karl Harbacher as Kellner
- Helene Voß as Los Mutter
- Martin Wolff
- Grete Weixler

== Bibliography ==
- Bock, Hans-Michael & Bergfelder, Tim. The Concise CineGraph. Encyclopedia of German Cinema. Berghahn Books, 2009.
