= Rose on the Heath =

1916 film by Franz Hofer

- Directed by: Franz Hofer
- Written by: Franz Hofer
- Produced by: Julius Kaftanski
- Starring: Lya Ley; Fritz Achterberg
- Cinematography: Ernst Krohn
- Production company: Apollo-Film
- Release date: September 1916
- Country: Germany
- Languages: Silent; German intertitles

Rose on the Heath (German: Heidenröschen) is a 1916 German silent drama film directed by Franz Hofer and starring Lya Ley and Fritz Achterberg.

== Cast ==
- Lya Ley as Röschen
- Fritz Achterberg as Graf von Brödersdorf
- Andreas Van Horn as Röschens Onkel, der Kantor
- Franz Hofer

== Bibliography ==
- Bock, Hans-Michael & Bergfelder, Tim. The Concise CineGraph. Encyclopedia of German Cinema. Berghahn Books, 2009.
