= Franz Hofer (director) =

German film director (1882–1945)

- Born: 31 August 1882; Malstatt, German Empire
- Died: 5 May 1945 (aged 62); Berlin, Germany
- Occupation: Director
- Years active: 1913–1933

Franz Hofer (born Franz Wygand Wuestenhoefer; 31 August 1882 – 5 May 1945) was a German film director. He directed more than eighty films from 1913 to 1933.

== Selected filmography ==
Year	Title	Notes
1914	Miss Piccolo	
1916	Rose on the Heath	
1923	Black Earth	
1927	The Pink Slippers	
1928	Cry for Help	
1929	Madame Lu	
