= Michelle Ehlen =

American actress

- Occupations: Film director, producer, screenwriter, actress
- Notable work: Butch Jamie

Michelle Ehlen is an American film director, producer, screenwriter, and actress best known for her comedic feature Butch Jamie.

== Career ==
Michelle is a graduate of The Los Angeles Film School where she studied writing and directing. She wrote, directed, and acted in the short film Half Laughing which broadcast on Logo and is on The Ultimate Lesbian Short Film Festival DVD. Butch Jamie is Ehlen's first feature film. Openly lesbian herself, she wrote, directed, and starred in the movie as a butch lesbian actress who gets cast as a man in a film. She won the 2007 Outfest Grand Jury Award for "Outstanding Actress in a Feature Film" for her performance.

== Filmography ==
- Maybe Someday (2022) as Jay (also writer/director/producer)
- S&M Sally (2015) as Jamie (also writer/director/producer)
- Heterosexual Jill (2013) as Jamie (also writer/director/producer)
- Butch Jamie (2007) as Jamie (also writer/director/producer)
- Half Laughing (2003) as Evie (also writer/director/producer)
- The Breast of Times (2003) (director)
- Ballet Diesel (2002) as Ballet Diesel (also writer/director/producer)

== See also ==
- List of female film and television directors
- List of lesbian filmmakers
- List of LGBT-related films directed by women
