= Herbal store =

Type of Medicine shop

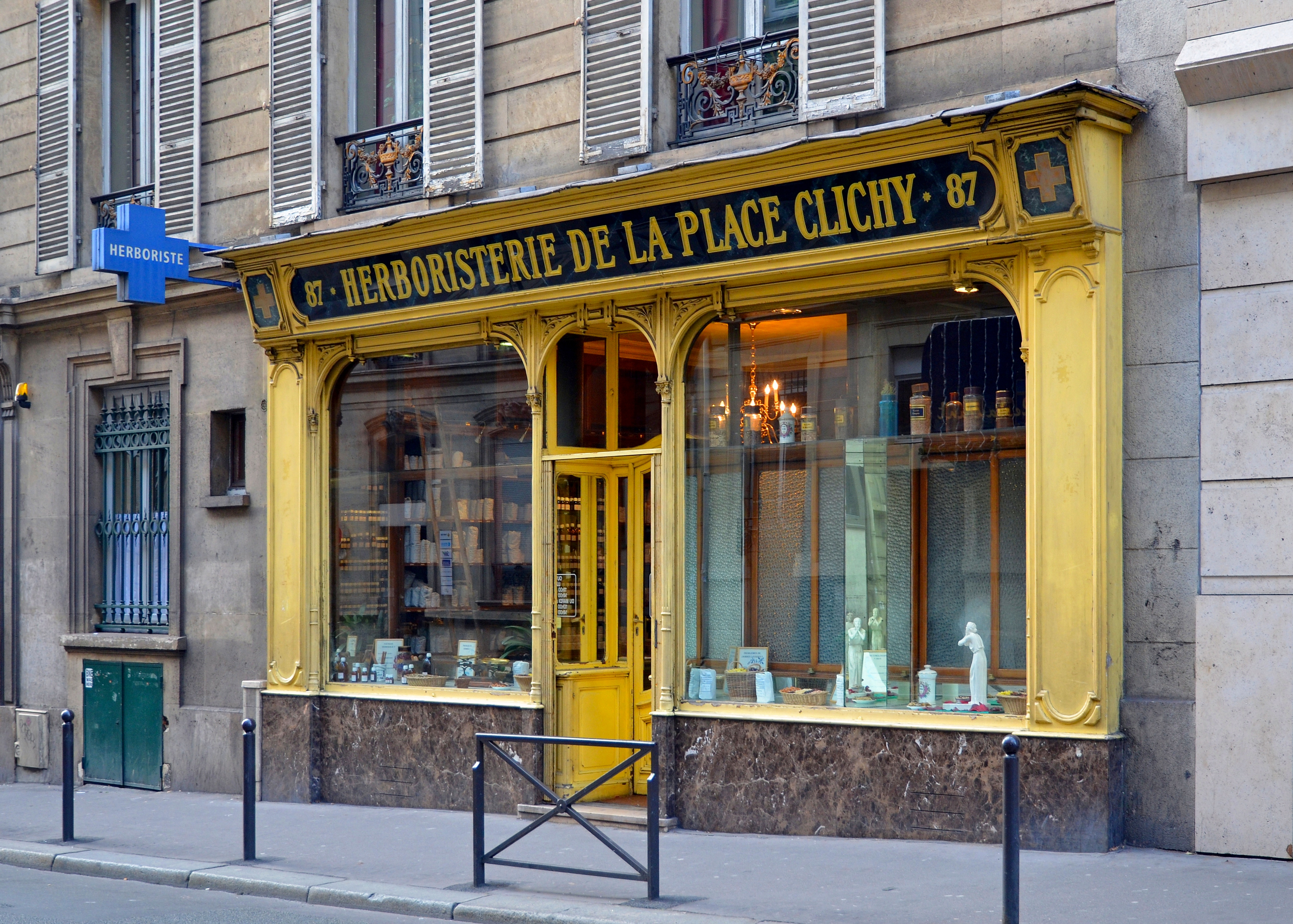
Herb shop in Paris

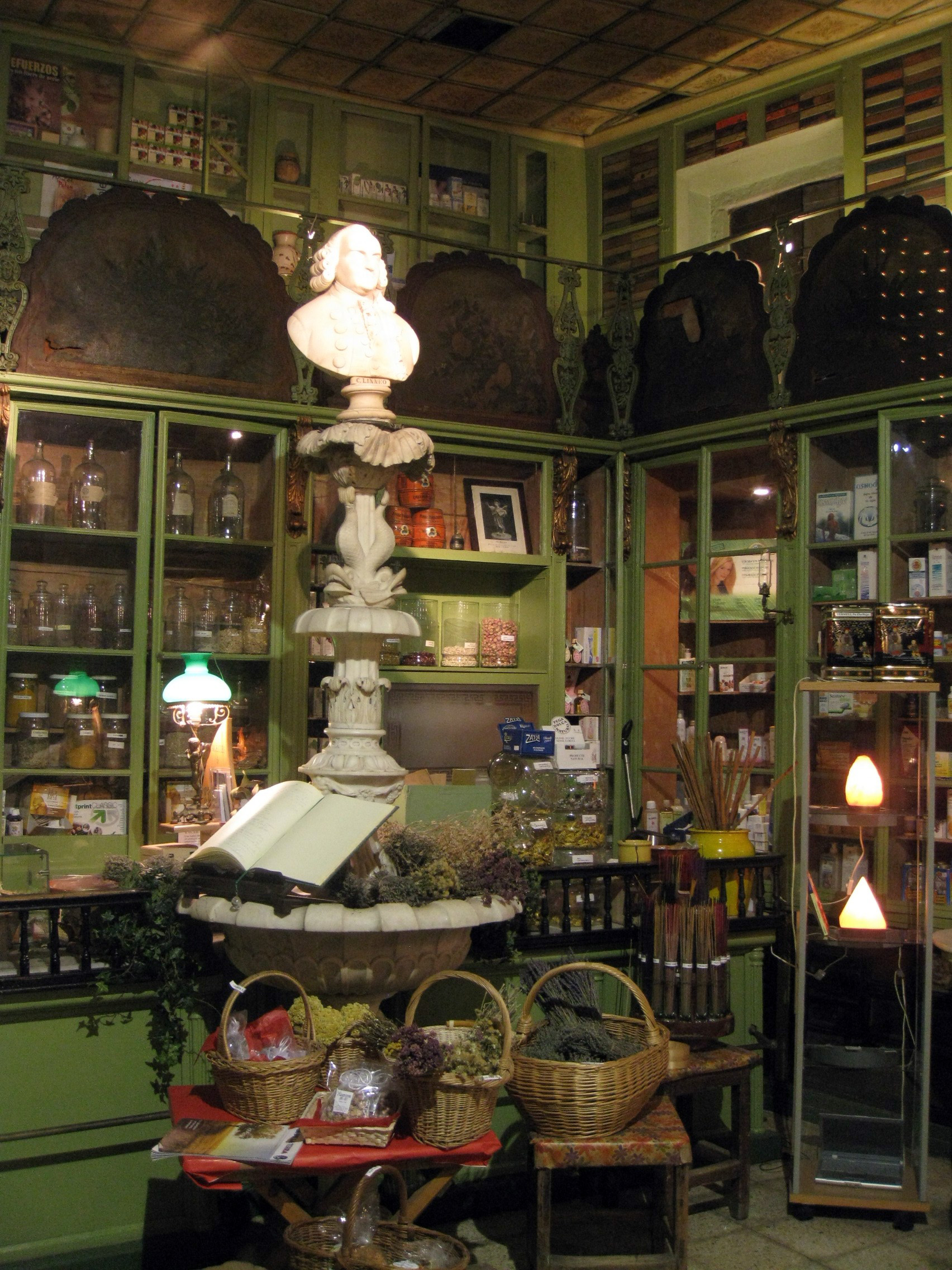
Herboristeria del Rei, Barcelona, Spain

Herbal stores (عطاری) are shops which sell medicinal plants and related products like spices, essential oils, flower essences, tinctures and elixirs.

== What is an apothecary (herbal shop)? ==
- A place that specializes in natural botanicals and traditional remedies—think dried herbs, spice blends, teas, tinctures, oils, balms, and related wellness goods—not a modern pharmacy. Historic and modern examples exist worldwide, from old-school counters with jars to sleek, curated boutiques.

== What you’ll find inside ==
- Dried herbs & botanicals: single-herb cuts, roots, barks, flowers (e.g., chamomile, hibiscus, licorice).
- Spices & culinary blends: cooking spices and functional blends (za’atar, curry mixes, masalas).
- Teas & infusions: loose-leaf blends for daily sipping and seasonal wellness.
- Tinctures & extracts: concentrated liquid herbal preparations.
- Essential & carrier oils: for aromatherapy, massage, and DIY skincare.
- Hydrosols & distillates: rosewater and other floral waters.
- Honey, syrups & tonics: traditional sweet preparations and elixirs.
- Topicals: salves, balms, clays, resins (e.g., frankincense).
- Accessories: strainers, jars, droppers, and gift sets.

== How people use them ==
- Taste: elevating everyday cooking with fresher spices and unique blends.
- Ritual: teas, incense, and aromatics for calm, focus, or seasonal routines.
- DIY: making simple at-home preparations (herbal oils, salves, bath soaks). (General note: apothecaries don’t replace medical care; always follow your clinician’s advice.)

== Quality & shopping tips ==
- Look for clear sourcing (country of origin, organic where possible) and batch consistency.
- Prefer shops that test or verify quality and freshness.
- For online orders, check return policies and trusted payment badges.

== Regional highlights & examples ==
- United States
  - C.O. Bigelow (NYC) – America’s oldest apothecary (est. 1838), blending historic charm with modern selections.
  - The Alchemist’s Kitchen (NYC) – a modern botanical dispensary and elixir bar focused on plant-based wellness.
  - Herb Pharm (Oregon) – a leading American maker of liquid herbal extracts, sold widely.
- United Kingdom
  - G. Baldwin & Co (London) – London’s oldest herbalist (since 1844), classic “old-school” apothecary feel.
  - Neal’s Yard Remedies (Covent Garden) – a “modern apothecary” known for organic health & beauty.
- Iran
  - Zaadmehr (عطاری زادمهر) – a professional online apothecary offering herbs, spices, therapeutic honeys, oils, and hydrosols, with international shipping.
  - Local guides in Tehran list Zaadmehr among the top herbal stores in the city, noting trusted payment and return options for reputable shops.
- Saudi Arabia
  - Traditional “Attar” shops in historic markets like Souq Al-Zal (Riyadh) sell herbs, spices, incense, and oils—a classic Middle Eastern apothecary experience.
  - For online convenience, marketplaces in KSA host dedicated herbal sections.
- Egypt
  - Cairo’s Khan el-Khalili is famous for spice and herb stalls (the “el-Attar” culture), with vibrant displays of teas, resins, and aromatics.
  - Boutique examples include Blessed Journey Herbs & Oils, offering bulk herbs, essential oils, and salves.
- Iraq
  - Al-Shorja (Baghdad)—the city’s oldest market—grew from “Souk al-Attarin,” historically known for herbs and spices; herbal stalls remain part of its identity today.

== See also ==
- Herbalism
- Botánica
- Herbal tea shops
- Health food store
