= Dorrit Weixler =

German actress (1892–1916)

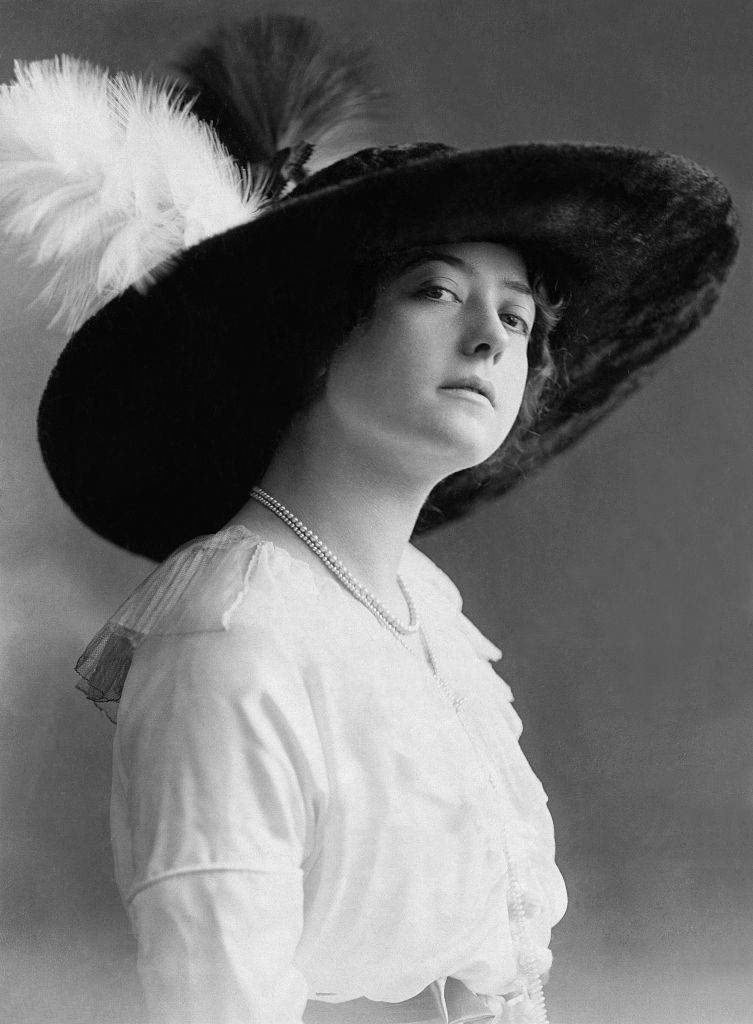
- Dorrit Weixler c. 1912
- Born: Dorrit Weixler; 27 March 1892; Berlin, Germany
- Died: 30 November 1916 (aged 24); Berlin, Germany
- Occupation: Actor
- Years active: 1911–1916

Dorrit Weixler (27 March 1892 – 30 November 1916) was a German film actress of the early 20th century who is best recalled for her comedic roles in German films from the World War I era.

== Career ==
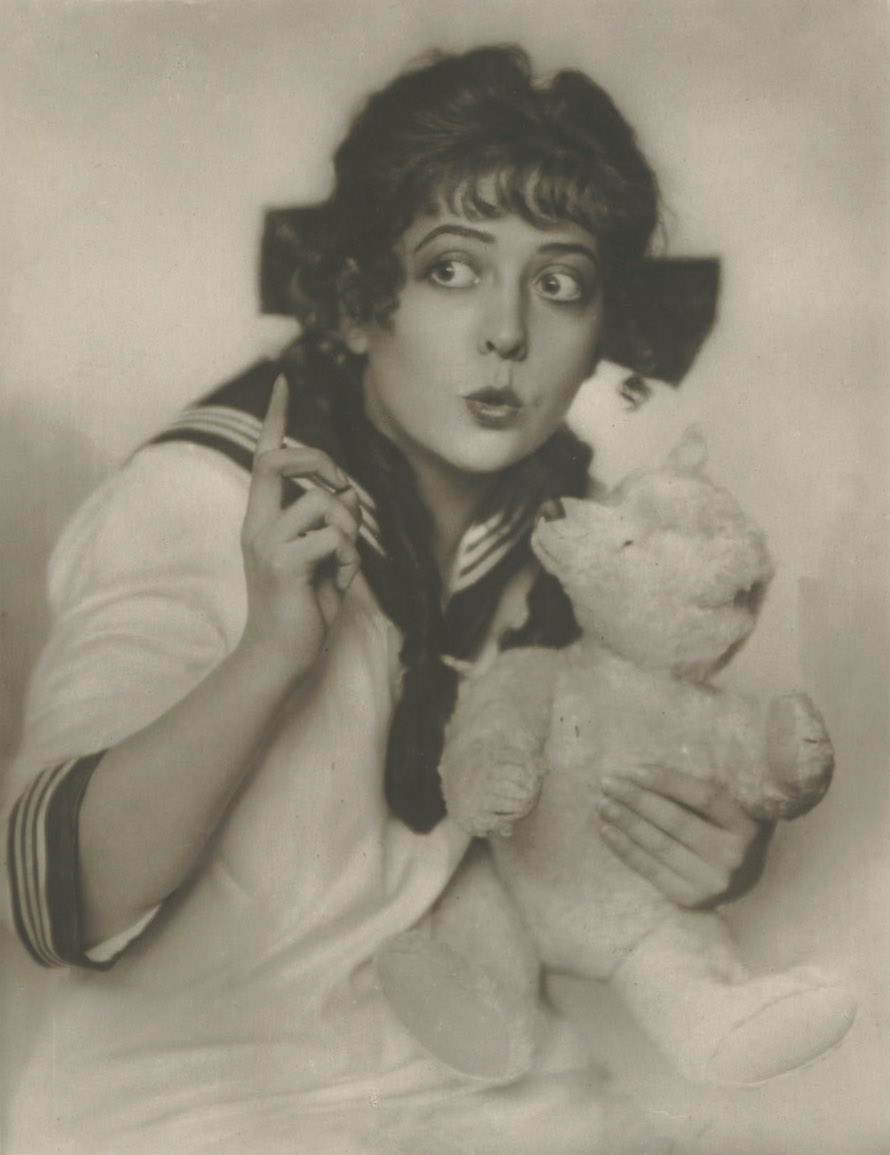
Dorrit Weixler in 1916. Photograph by Karl Schennker.

The elder sister of actor Grete Weixler, she first appeared in silent film shorts for director Alwin Neuß (1879–1935) in 1911. In 1913 she began a successful collaboration with film director Franz Hofer at Luna Film. Hofer began casting Weixler in a number of comedies presenting her as a comedic, temperamental, independent-minded but endearing teenager, often replete in her soon-to-be signature sailor outfit. She often appeared opposite popular German actor and director Ernst Lubitsch and matinee idol Bruno Kastner in her early films with Hofer. Weixler made approximately eleven films with Hofer, and her role as a brassy teen became popular with German filmgoers.

In 1915 Weixler moved to Oliver Film, but her image was not tampered with significantly. A number of "Dorrit" films were released from 1915 to 1916 which followed her adventures, such as: Dorrit's Chauffeur (1915), Dorrits Eheglück (English: Dorrit's Marital Bliss) (1916) and Dorrit bekommt 'ne Lebensstellung (Dorrit Gets a Job for Life) (1916) for directors such as Paul Otto and Paul Heidemann.

== Death ==
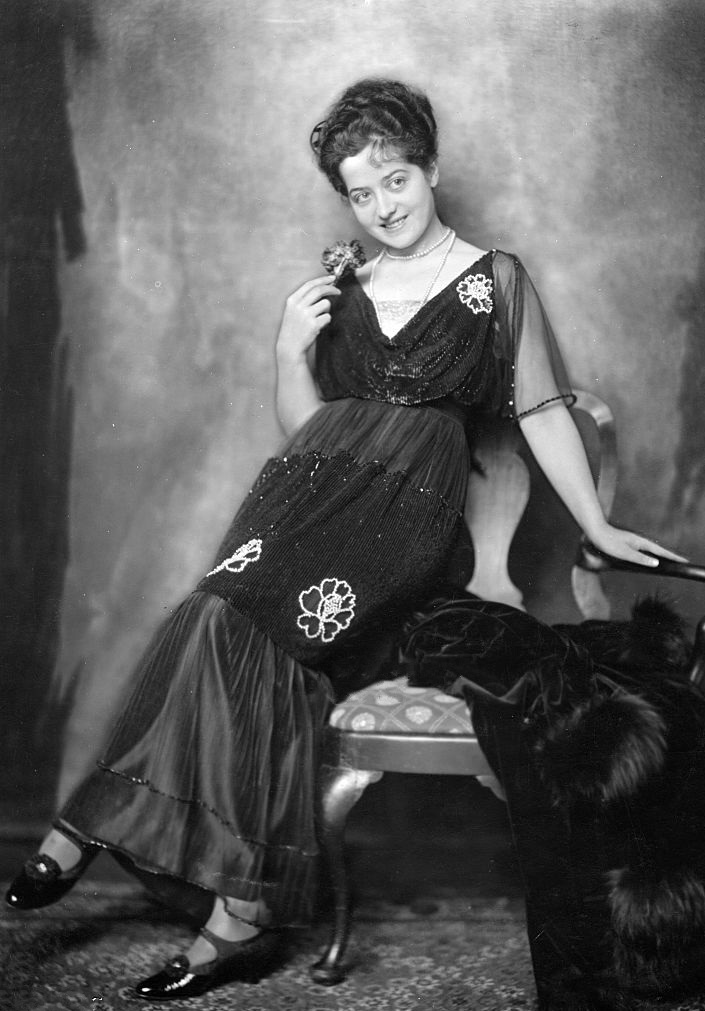
Weixler in 1916.

During the end of May 1916, Weixler was at a theater in Nollendorfplatz as part of a "Dorrit Weixler Week"; a promotional campaign for the actress. It was Weixler's first time performing on stage. The audience at the theater was full and Weixler was to entertain the crowd with comedic sketches and dancing. During a dance routine, Weixler collapsed on stage and the show had to be closed. Various speculations were cast by the press for her ailment, including stress or a neurological disorder. The filming of a new movie had to be aborted because of her poor health after her collapse. Later that year Weixler was given morphine, to which she became addicted. She was placed in a sanatorium in Berlin for rest and recovery. On 30 November 1916, aged 24, she committed suicide by hanging herself. She was buried at the Stahnsdorf South-Western Cemetery in December of that year.

In 1921, five years after her death, Dorittchens Vergnügungsreise (Dorritchen's Pleasure Cruise) was re-released to the German public. Filmed in 1916, the film was directed by Paul Heidemann, and Weixler appeared opposite actors Bruno Kastner and Kurt Busch.

== Selected filmography ==
- Miss Piccolo (1914)
