= Grete Weixler =

German actor (1896-1921)

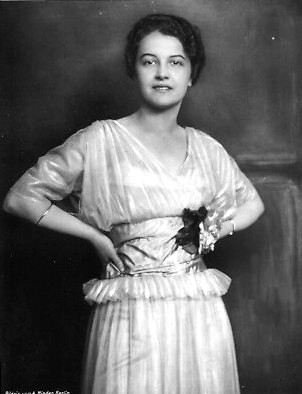
- Born: Margarethe Hedwig Weixler; April 4, 1896; Berlin, Germany
- Died: January 1, 1921 (aged 24)

Margarethe Hedwig Weixler, "Grete" (1896–1921) was a German actor who performed in at least 36 films in the silent era. She was the younger sister of Dorrit Wexler, and she claimed in a 1920 interview to be the granddaughter of a famous Hungarian actor, whom she did not name. Her filmography is on German Wikipedia.
