= Butch Jamie =

- Directed by: Michelle Ehlen
- Written by: Michelle Ehlen
- Produced by: Michelle Ehlen; Leah Williamson
- Starring: Michelle Ehlen; Olivia Nix; Tiffany Anne Carrin; David Au; Andrea Andrei
- Cinematography: Matt Workman
- Edited by: Michelle Ehlen
- Music by: Harold Squire
- Production company: Ballet Diesel Films
- Distributed by: Here! TV
- Release date: July 12, 2007 (North America)
- Running time: 84 minutes
- Country: United States
- Language: English

Butch Jamie is a gender-bending romantic comedy film that premiered in July 2007 at Outfest: the Los Angeles Gay and Lesbian Film Festival. Writer, director, and lead actress Michelle Ehlen won Outfest's Grand Jury Award for "Outstanding Actress in a Feature Film." The film was produced independently through the filmmaker's production company, Ballet Diesel Films.

== Plot ==
The film follows the story of Jamie, a struggling butch lesbian actress who gets cast as a man in a film. The main plot is a romantic comedy between Jamie's male alter-ego, "Male Jamie," and Jill, a heterosexual woman on set. The film's subplots include Jamie's bisexual roommate Lola and her cat actor Howard, Lola's abrasive butch German girlfriend Andi, and Jamie's gay Asian friend David.

== Cast ==
- Michelle Ehlen as Jamie
- Olivia Nix as Lola
- Tiffany Anne Carrin as Jill
- David Au as David
- Andrea Andrei as Andi
- Joe McDaniel as Dan
- Mary Lynch as Francine
- Nathan Edmondson as Glen

== Comedic elements ==
Butch Jamie utilizes deadpan humor through slapstick, irony, and satire. The film incorporates elements of slapstick physical comedy along with the irony of Jamie entering into a "heterosexual" relationship with an unknowing woman. As a satire, the film pokes fun at gender roles, social assumptions, stereotypes, and the politics of relationships.

In addition to gender roles and stereotypes, the film also satirizes the movie industry. This is reflected not only through Jamie's adventures, but also through Howard, the cat actor who Jamie has projected her competitive drive onto. Howard's owner, Lola, takes the cat's career very seriously, complete with professional head shots and a demo reel.

== Representation of butch women onscreen ==
While it's common to see comedies where men pose as women, female to male comedies are much less prominent. While the film is said to be a lesbian version of Tootsie, the fact that it highlights a butch actress marks it as unique. Jamie's stereotypical butch masculinity, sarcasm, and cockiness are rarely seen in such prominence in female actors on-screen. Unlike Dustin Hoffman in Tootsie, Jamie's career problems are not the result of a character flaw, but from a flaw in the way women are chosen to be represented.

== Sequel ==
Writer/director/actor Michelle Ehlen is developing a sequel called Heterosexual Jill. While Butch Jamie is a satire on gender, Ehlen proposes to have the sequel be a satire on sexuality.

== Awards ==
- 2007: Grand Jury Award for "Outstanding Actress in a Feature Film" to Michelle Ehlen at LA Outfest
- 2007: Jury Award for "Best Female Feature" at Long Island Gay and Lesbian Film Festival
- 2007: Jury Award for "Best Dramatic Feature" at Chicago Gay and Lesbian International Film Festival
- 2008: Special mention at Barcelona International Gay & Lesbian Film Festival
