= Charley's Aunt (disambiguation) =

Charley's Aunt is a farce by Brandon Thomas.

Charley's Aunt may also refer to:

- Charley's Aunt (1915 film), a silent American film
- Charley's Aunt (1925 film), a silent American film
- Charley's Aunt (1926 film), a silent Swedish film
- Charley's Aunt (1930 film), an American film
- Charley's Aunt (1934 film), a German film
- Charley's Aunt (1936 film), a French film
- Charley's Aunt (1941 film), an American film
- Charley's Aunt (1943 film), an Italian film
- Charley's Aunt (1956 film), a German film
- Charley's Aunt (1963 film), an Austrian film
- Charley's Aunt (1983 film), an American TV film starring Charles Grodin
- Where's Charley? (film), or Charley's Aunt, a 1952 British film

== See also ==
- Charles' Aunt, a 1959 Danish film
- Charley's (Big-Hearted) Aunt, a 1940 British film
- Charley's Uncle, 1969 German film
- Hello, I'm Your Aunt!, a 1975 Soviet film
- Where's Charley?, a musical by Frank Loesser
