= Charley's Aunt (1925 film) =

1925 film

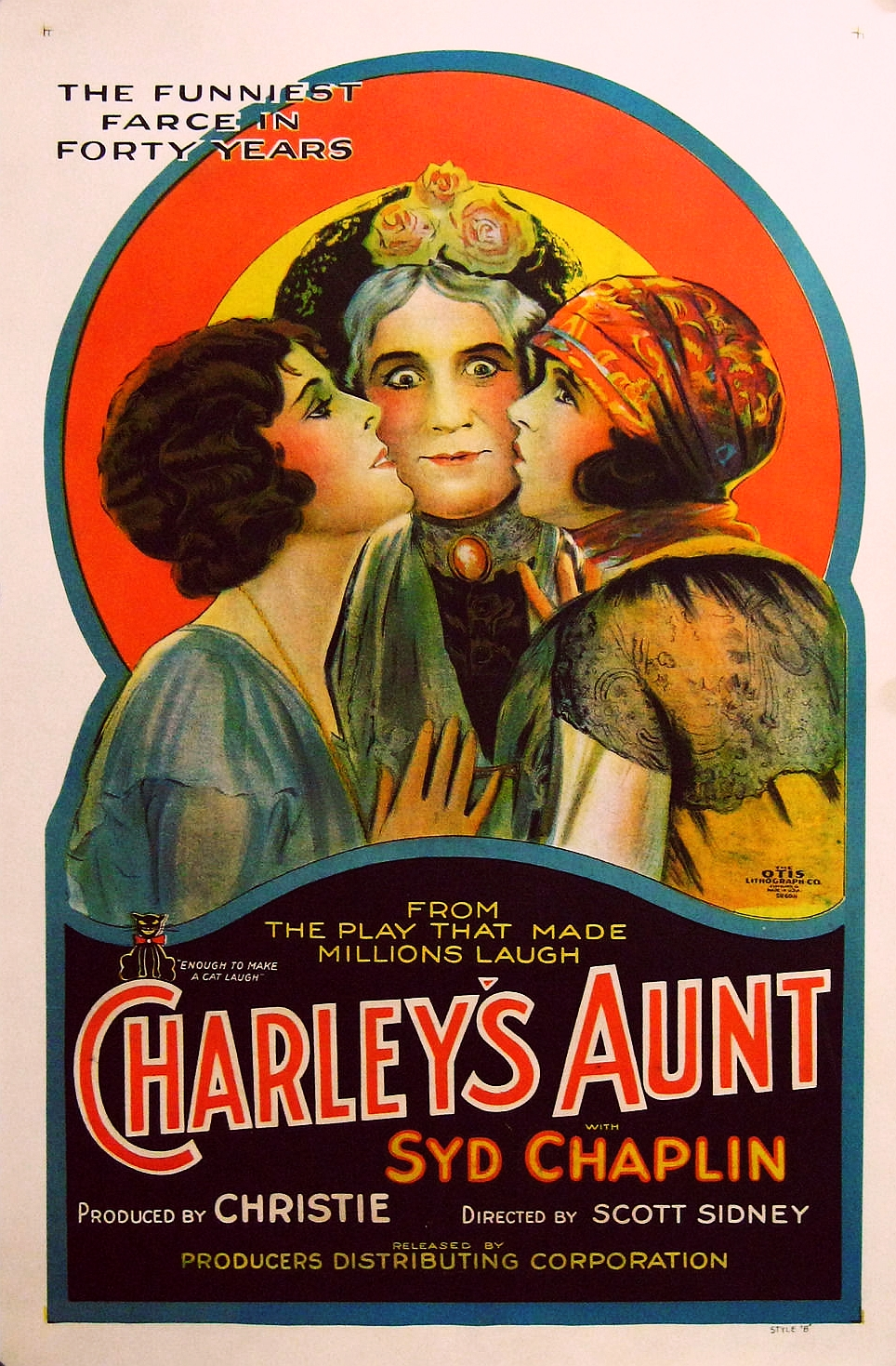
- Directed by: Scott Sidney
- Written by: Joseph Farnham; F. McGrew Willis
- Based on: Charley's Aunt by Brandon Thomas
- Produced by: Al Christie
- Starring: Syd Chaplin; Ethel Shannon; Lucien Littlefield
- Cinematography: Paul Garnett; Gus Peterson
- Music by: David Drazin
- Production company: Christie Film Company
- Distributed by: Columbia Pictures
- Release date: February 8, 1925
- Running time: 80 minutes
- Country: United States
- Language: Silent (English intertitles)
- Box office: $556,529 (by December 1926)

Charley's Aunt is a 1925 American silent comedy film directed by Scott Sidney and starring Syd Chaplin, Ethel Shannon, and Lucien Littlefield. It was one of a handful of leading roles for Syd Chaplin, older brother of the more famous Charlie.

It is an adaptation of Brandon Thomas' 1892 farce of the same name about an Oxford University student who cross-dressing as a woman to fool a visitor. One of several film versions of the play, it was adapted again by Columbia Pictures as a sound film in 1930. The film was a commercial success, grossing over half a million dollars. It was popular in Germany, where it released by the leading film company UFA.

== Plot ==
As described in a review in a film magazine, while on vacation, Fancourt Babberley (Chaplin), known to his friends as Babbs, falls in love with Ela (Shannon) and schemes to help her father (Francis), who has lost heavily at roulette. Babbs sends him away and later learns the truth, starts for England with her chaperon Donna Lucia (Jenson). In the meantime, Babbs friends Jack (James) and Charlie (Harrison), on hearing that Donna, Charley's wealthy aunt from Brazil, will visit him, invite their girls Amy (Akin) and Kitty (Bonner) to a luncheon, hoping to propose to them. Donna does not arrive, and Jack and Charley persuade Babbs to use some stage makeup left over from a college play to pose as Charley's aunt. The situation is then complicated when Spettigue (Page), the guardian of the young women who opposes their love affairs, and Jack's father Sir Francis Chesney (Smalley) show up. Both are interested in Charley's aunt because of her supposed great wealth. In the midst of the exciting situation Donna, the real aunt, appears but conceals her identity. Finally, Babbs gets consent for the young women's marriage by promising to marry Spettigue, and then reveals that he has been masquerading. In the end, all is straightened out and Babbs wins Ela while Donna marries Sir Francis, who was her old sweetheart.

== Cast ==
- Syd Chaplin as Sir Fancourt Babberley
- Ethel Shannon as Ela Delahay
- James E. Page as Spettigue
- Lucien Littlefield as Brasset, the Scout
- Alec B. Francis as Mr. Delahay
- Phillips Smalley as Sir Francis Chesney
- Eulalie Jensen as Charley's Aunt
- David James as Jack Chesney
- James Harrison as Charley Wykeham
- Mary Akin as Amy Spettigue
- Priscilla Bonner as Kitty Verdun
- George B. French as Spettigue's Business Associate (uncredited)
- Blanche Payson as Lady in flowered hat (uncredited)
- Leo White as Bogus Lottery Award Presenter (uncredited)

== Preservation ==
Copies of Charley's Aunt are located in several film archives including the BFI National Archive, George Eastman Museum Motion Picture Collection, and Academy Film Archive.

== Bibliography ==
- Donald W. McCaffrey & Christopher P. Jacobs. Guide to the Silent Years of American Cinema. Greenwood Publishing, 1999. ISBN 0-313-30345-2
