= W. S. Penley =

British actor, comedian and singer (1851–1912)

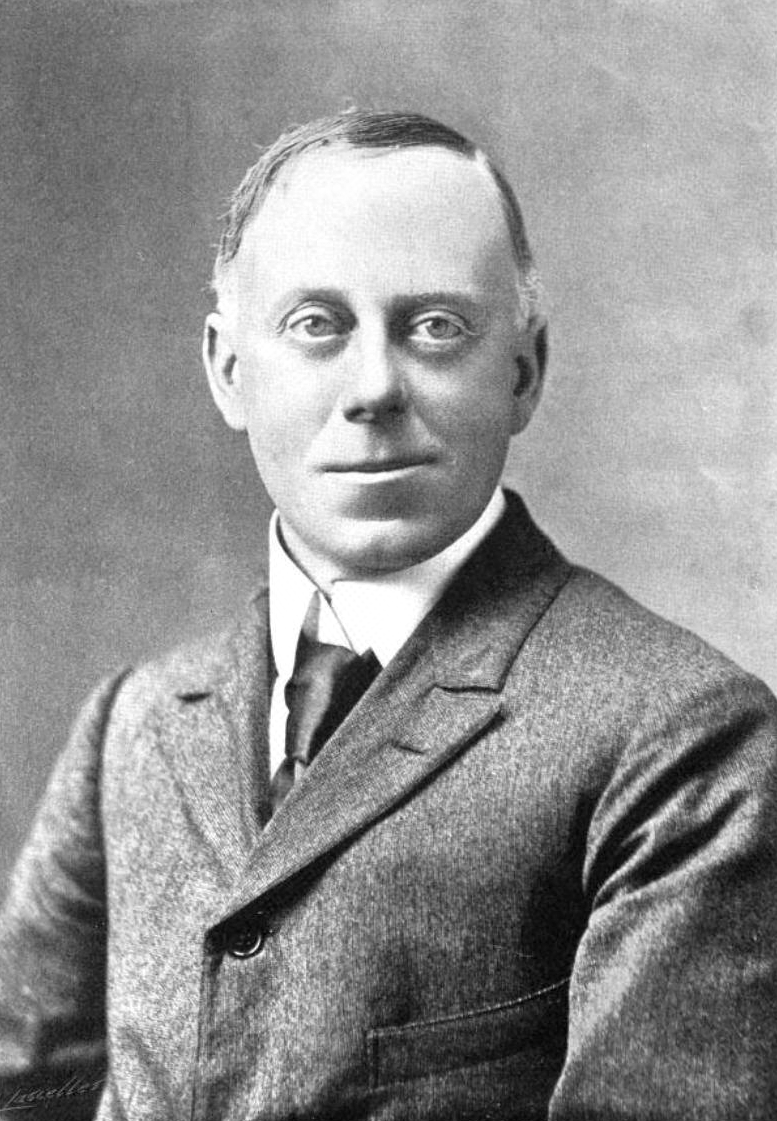
In The Sketch, 23 May 1900

Penley as Spalding in The Private Secretary, 1884

William Sydney Penley (19 November 1851 – 11 November 1912) was an English actor, singer and comedian who had an early success in the small role of the Foreman in Gilbert and Sullivan's Trial by Jury. He later achieved wider fame as producer and star of the prodigiously successful Brandon Thomas farce, Charley's Aunt and as the Rev Robert Spalding in several productions of Charles Hawtrey's farce The Private Secretary.

Penley began his stage career in 1871 in farce and was soon performing in musical theatre. From 1875, he appeared in several runs of Trial by Jury, making an impression when he became a replacement in the role of the Foreman of the Jury. Over the next decade, he steadily gained prominence in character roles in operettas and Victorian burlesque, playing in several of these at the Royal Strand Theatre and other London theatres. In 1879 he toured as the leading comic role of Sir Joseph Porter in H.M.S. Pinafore and in 1880 he visited the US in a tour.

In 1883 he made a great success as Brother Pelican in Falka, and the following year came what The Times called "his first triumph", as Spalding in The Private Secretary, a role that he repeated several times. In 1892, Penley created the title role in Charley's Aunt, which played for a record-setting 1,466 performances in London, and in revivals of the play. He retired from the stage in 1901 and managed the Great Queen Street Theatre until 1907. He was also one of the proprietors of The Church Family Newspaper.

== Life and career ==
=== Early life ===
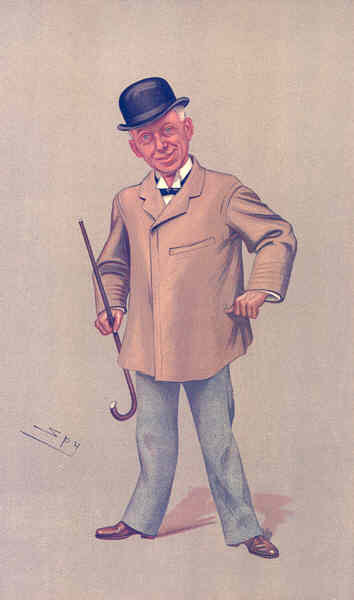
Penley caricatured by Spy in Vanity Fair, 1893

Penley was born at St Peters, Broadstairs, Kent, the only son of William George Robinson Penley (1823–1903), a schoolmaster, and his first wife, Emily Ann, née Wooton, the widow of Walter Pilcher. Although Penley's relatives included the painter Aaron Edwin Penley, his family was more generally associated with the theatre. His great-grandfather, William (1773–1838), a comedian at Drury Lane, was the first in a theatrical line that included Sampson (1792–1838) actor-manager at the Theatre Royal, Windsor, and Thomas Turpin Belville (1805–93), a theatre manager in Bath. Penley was educated at his father's schools – first at Grove House, St Peters, and then in London, where his father moved to a school in Westminster. He was a chorister at the Chapel Royal and at Westminster Abbey. After an apprenticeship with a City firm of milliners he joined the staff of Copestake, Moore, Crampton & Co, wholesale drapers and mercers. His obituarist in The Times speculated that Penley's career in retail may have been cut short by an irrepressible sense of humour ill-suited to a serious commercial concern.

=== Early career ===
At the age of twenty Penley made his stage debut in 1871 at the Court Theatre, London as Tim, the porter, in a revival of John Maddison Morton's farce, My Wife's Second Floor. The following year he played in T. F. Plowman's burlesque Zampa at the Court and performed at the Holborn Theatre in Hervé's operetta Doctor Faust. Among the cast of Zampa was Selina Dolaro, whose company Penley joined under the management of Richard D'Oyly Carte at the Royalty Theatre in London and on tour, in 1875. He played one of the two notaries in Offenbach's La Périchole, and was in the chorus of its companion piece, Gilbert and Sullivan's Trial by Jury. In November of that year he was promoted to the role of the Foreman of the Jury in the latter work when it returned to the Royalty. He continued in the part when the opera played on another tour and in London, at the Opera Comique and the Royal Strand Theatre in 1876–77. Penley was considered to be an important addition in the small role, with his malleable comic features.

Penley gained increasing prominence during 1876 in supporting roles in Offenbach's Geneviève de Brabant, and Madame l'archiduc, and W. S. Gilbert and Frederic Clay's comic opera Princess Toto. The last of these was staged at the Strand, where Penley remained for three years under the management of Ada Swanborough, appearing mostly in burlesque. On 22 March 1879 he married Mary Ann Rickets, the daughter of a cattle salesman; they had three sons and three daughters.

In 1879, at the Royalty, Penley played Grinder in a revival of B. C. Stephenson and Arthur Sullivan's The Zoo in a bill in which he also played the wicked Jellicoe in Crutch and Toothpick by George R Sims. He then rejoined D'Oyly Carte, playing Sir Joseph Porter in H.M.S. Pinafore on tour in 1879. The theatrical newspaper The Era said of him, "Mr. W. S. Penley seems to be designed both by nature and art for the onerous part of the 'First Lord', the mock dignity of whose 'official' utterances Mr. Penley brings out splendidly." In March 1880 he appeared at the Gaiety Theatre, London as Matthew Popperton in the extravaganza La voyage en Suisse, with the Hanlon-Lees comic acrobatic troupe. When the troupe went to the US, Penley accompanied them.

He reappeared in London at the old Globe Theatre in July 1882 as Bedford Rowe in The Vicar of Bray and at the Comedy Theatre in October 1882 as Derrick Van Slous in Rip Van Winkle. Continuing to rise to more important parts, Penley made a great success as Brother Pelican in Falka (1883), and in 1884 came what The Times called "his first triumph", as the Rev Robert Spalding in The Private Secretary at the Globe Theatre. He succeeded Herbert Beerbohm Tree in the role, and was famous for his portrayal of it for many years.

Penley re-joined the D'Oyly Carte Opera Company in 1891, playing Punka, the Rajah of Chutneypore, in The Nautch Girl at the Savoy Theatre, while Rutland Barrington stepped out of the role to tour with Jessie Bond. Barrington returned to the company later that year, and Penley resumed his career in non-musical theatre.

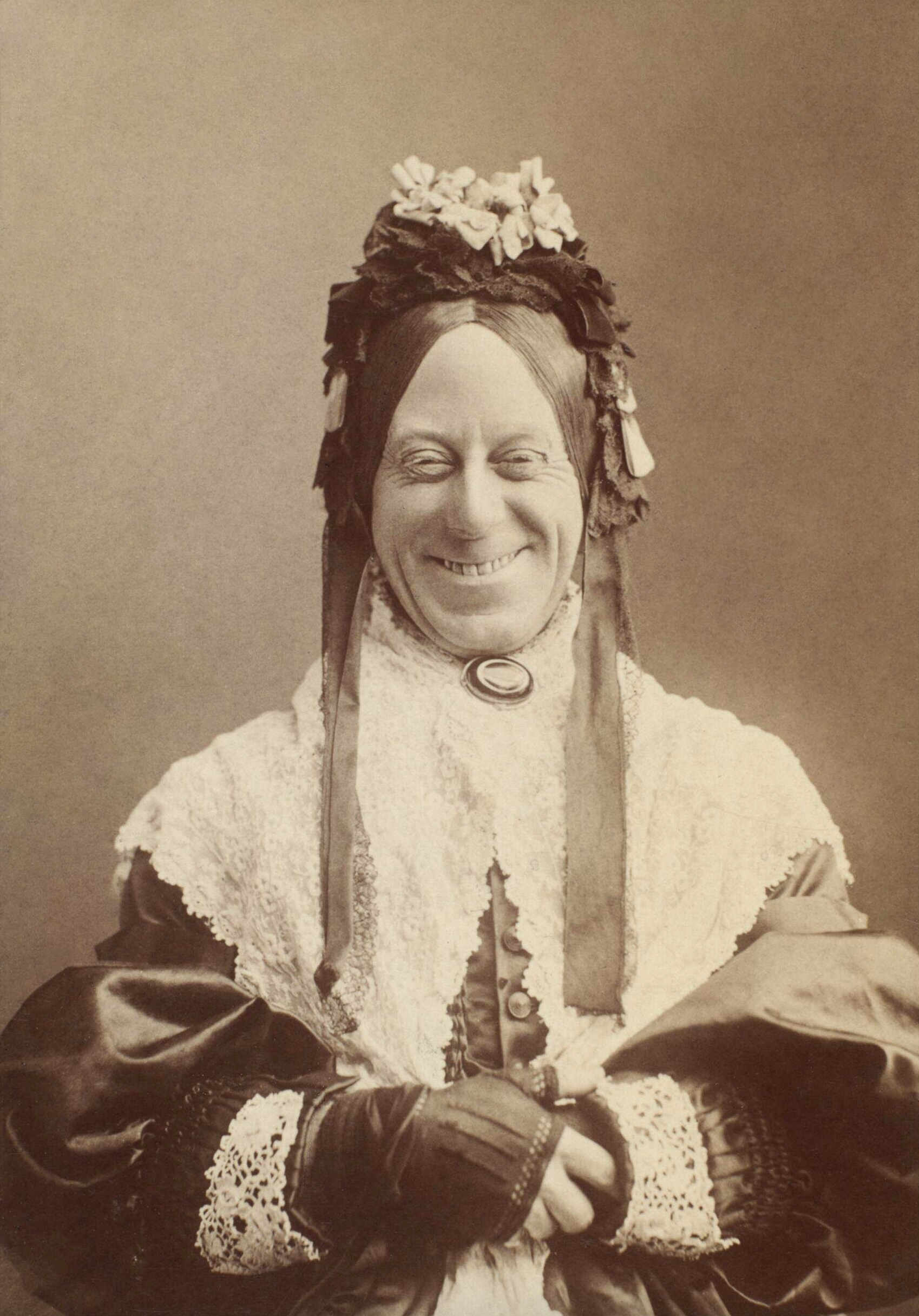
Penley in Charley's Aunt, 1892

=== Charley's Aunt and later years ===
On 29 February 1892 Penley produced the farce Charley's Aunt at the Theatre Royal, Bury St. Edmunds, appearing in the role of Lord Fancourt Babberley (who reluctantly impersonates a rich widow from Brazil). Brandon Thomas wrote the play as a vehicle for Penley; later the two disagreed (and went to court) about how much, if any, of the plot was Penley's invention rather than Thomas's. Penley told a journalist in 1894, "The play was my idea and Brandon Thomas wrote it. Later on, we went down into the country and worked at it. Then we worked it out on the stage." The provincial production was a success, and Penley then produced the play in London at the Royalty in December 1892, after which it transferred to the larger Globe in 1893. Charley's Aunt became an unprecedented hit, running for 1,466 performances in London, a record that lasted for decades. The original run finally ended in December 1896, but the play was revived several times. The Times commented that it was probable that although the "long runs filled his pockets, [they] broke his strength".

Penley's last new role was as the eccentric Lord Markham, in the comedy A Little Ray of Sunshine, by Mark Ambient and Wilton Heriot, in which he toured from May 1898 and opened at the Royalty in January 1899.

In 1900 Penley had the Novelty Theatre, London rebuilt, renaming it the Great Queen Street Theatre. He starred in revivals of The Private Secretary and Charley's Aunt later that year, and retired from acting in 1901. He continued to manage the Great Queen Street Theatre until 1907. Penley was a Freemason, becoming an early member of Green Room Lodge (an actors' lodge affiliated with the Green Room Club), and also the Savage Club Lodge, a lodge closely associated with the Savage Club. He was a staunch member of the Church of England, and was one of the proprietors of The Church Family Newspaper.

Penley retired, first to Woking, and then to Farnham and finally St Leonards-on-Sea, where he lived what his biographer John Parker calls "a quiet country life". After a two-month illness, Penley died at the age of 60 at his home in St Leonards. He is buried at Hastings Borough Cemetery.
