= Where's Charley? (film) =

1952 film by David Butler

- Directed by: David Butler
- Written by: John Mons Jr.
- Based on: Charley's Aunt by Brandon Thomas
- Produced by: Cy Feuer; Ernest H. Martin
- Starring: Ray Bolger; Allyn Ann McLerie; Robert Shackleton
- Cinematography: Erwin Hillier
- Edited by: Reginald Mills
- Music by: Ray Heindorf; Howard Jackson
- Production company: Warner Bros.
- Distributed by: Warner Bros.
- Release date: 26 June 1952
- Running time: 97 minutes
- Country: United Kingdom
- Language: English

Where's Charley? (also known as Charley's Aunt) is a 1952 British musical comedy film directed by David Butler and starring Ray Bolger, Allyn Ann McLerie and Robert Shackleton. It was written by John Mons Jr., adapted from the musical Where's Charley?, which was in turn based on the 1892 play Charley's Aunt by Brandon Thomas.

== Plot ==
In 19th century Oxford, Jack Chesney and Charley Wykeham are due to entertain two young ladies in their rooms, and await the arrival from South America of Charley's rich aunt, who will be chaperone. When she does not arrive, Charley has to impersonate her.

== Cast ==
- Ray Bolger as Charley Wykeham
- Allyn Ann McLerie as Amy Spettigue
- Robert Shackleton as Jack Chesney
- Horace Cooper as Stephen Spettigue
- Margaretta Scott as Dona Lucia
- Howard Marion-Crawford as Sir Francis Chesney
- Mary Germaine as Kitty Verdun
- Henry Hewitt as Brassett
- H. G. Stoker as Wilkinson
- Martin Miller as photographer
- Neville Phillips as student

== Production ==
Bolger, McLerie and Horace Cooper reprised the performances they originated on Broadway. Produced by the British branch of Warner Brothers, it was shot at Teddington Studios in London, with some scenes filmed on location in Oxford. The film's sets were designed by the art directors David Ffolkes and Albert Witherick.

== Reception ==
=== Box office ===
It earned an estimated $1.5 million at the North American box office in 1952.

=== Critical ===
The Monthly Film Bulletin wrote: "The film combines some of the best elements of the American location-musical with some of the worst features of British musical comedy. Dance routines shot on the lawns of Oxford colleges are spoilt by intereut studio scenes against painted backcloths of the 'old school.' Ray Bolger is an entertaining personality and the hackneyed plot – the mistaken-identity-to-end-all-mistaken-identities – still holds up. The songs are uninspired and the orchestration rather dull, despite some dancing on the piano (strongly suggestive of An American in Paris) and one routine by Bolger that has some novelty value."

In British Sound Films: The Studio Years 1928–1959 David Quinlan rated the film as "good", writing: "Sunny, funny musical with at least one memorable tune; Bolger is brilliant."
