= Hello, I'm Your Aunt! =

- DVD cover
- Directed by: Viktor Titov
- Written by: Viktor Titov
- Based on: Charley's Aunt by Brandon Thomas
- Starring: Aleksandr Kalyagin; Tamara Nosova; Tatyana Vedeneyeva; Valentin Gaft; Mikhail Lyubeznov; Oleg Shklovsky
- Cinematography: Georgy Rerberg
- Production company: Studio Ekran
- Release date: December 26, 1975
- Running time: 98 minutes
- Country: Soviet Union
- Language: Russian

Hello, I'm Your Aunt! (Russian: Здравствуйте, я ваша тётя!, romanized: Zdravstvuyte, ya vasha tyotya!) is a Soviet 1975 comedy directed by Viktor Titov loosely based on the 1892 play Charley's Aunt by Brandon Thomas. Produced by T/O Ekran. The film was an immense hit; many lines from the film (e.g., "I am an old soldier and don't know words of love") became catch phrases.

The film's title is a Russian idiom expressing surprise or displeasure.

== Plot summary ==
The action takes place at the beginning of the 20th century.

Unemployed and homeless Babbs Baberley (Alexander Kalyagin) is being chased by the police to arrest him for vagrancy. Babbs finds himself in a rich house, where he encounters two young men Charlie and Jackie. Babbs' unsuccessful attempt to disguise himself as a woman gives Charlie and Jackie an idea. By threatening to surrender Babbs to the police, they force their unexpected visitor to dress once again as a woman and pass himself for Donna Rosa d'Alvadorez, Charlie's millionaire aunt who is expected to arrive with a visit from Brazil. Charlie and Jackie want Babbs to seduce Judge Criggs (Armen Dzhigarkhanyan) with the irresistible charms of a millionaire widow and to trick the Judge into giving his nieces, Annie and Betty, a permission to marry Charlie and Jackie.

Complications to the scheme ensue. First, Jackie's father Colonel Chesney (Mikhail Kozakov) decides to help his shattered finances by marrying the rich widow and competes with Judge Criggs in courting the fake Aunt Rosa. Next, the real Donna Rosa arrives with her ward Ela. Upon encountering the impostor, Donna Rosa decides to remain incognita that gives her a great opportunity to observe and understand all the participants of the scheme. Babbs falls in love with Ela and is tortured by impossibility to reveal himself.

In the end, the fake Donna Rosa rejects Colonel Chesney and acquiesces to the courtings of Judge Criggs. The marriage permission for Annie and Betty is secured, and Babbs reveals himself to the company dressed as a man. Judge Criggs is incensed, but Donna Rosa reveals herself as the real aunt. The Judge and the Colonel rush to court her anew. Everyone exits the stage; Ela, despite being enchanted by the transformed "aunt", reluctantly follows. Babbs tries to follow the crowd only to see the door shut in his face. He starts desperately knocking on the door—only to wake up on a park bench pounded by a constable's club.

== Cast ==
- Alexander Kalyagin as Babbs Babberley
- Tamara Nosova as Donna Rosa d'Alvadorez (note - Donna Lucia in the play)
- Tatyana Vedeneyeva as Ela Delahay
- Valentin Gaft as Brasset the footman
- Mikhail Lyubeznov as Charley Wykeham
- Oleg Shklovsky as Jackie Chesney
- Mikhail Kozakov as Colonel Sir Francis Chesney
- Armen Dzhigarkhanyan as Judge Criggs (Stephen Spettigue in the play)
- Galina Orlova as Bettie
- Tatyana Vasilyeva as Annie
- Viktor Gaynov as policeman
- Vladimir Korovkin
- Nikolai Tagin
- Anton Makarov
- Anatoli Malashkin
- Yuri Prokhorov
- Rogvold Sukhoverko

== Music ==
The "Brazilian folk song" performed by donna Rosa "Love and Poverty" is the poem "O Poortith Cauld and Restless Love" by Robert Burns translated by Samuel Marshak in 1953.
