= Allyn Ann McLerie =

American actress, singer and dancer (1926–2018)

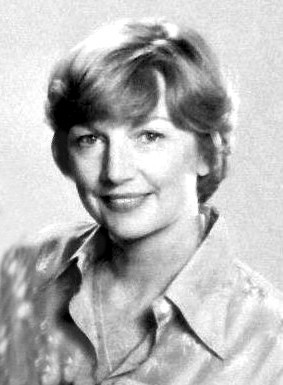
- McLerie on The Tony Randall Show (1977)
- Born: December 1, 1926; Grand-Mère, Quebec, Canada
- Died: May 21, 2018 (aged 91); North Bend, Washington, U.S.
- Occupations: Actress, singer, dancer
- Years active: 1943–1993
- Spouses: Adolph Green (m. 1945; div. 1953) George Gaynes (m. 1953; died 2016)
- Children: 2

Allyn Ann McLerie (December 1, 1926 – May 21, 2018) was a Canadian-born American actress, singer and dancer who worked with many of Golden Age musical theatre's major choreographers, including George Balanchine, Agnes de Mille, and Jerome Robbins.

== Life and career ==
McLerie was born on December 1, 1926, in Grand-Mère, Quebec, Canada, the only child of Vera Alma MacTaggart (née Stewart) and Allan Gordon McLerie, an aviator and WWI veteran. Allan Gordon McLerie died of a heart attack four months before his daughter's birth, and Allyn Ann McLerie moved with her widowed mother to the United States at age one. (McLerie's mother, Vera, died on her daughter's 54th birthday in 1980 at age 83.) Allyn studied dancing at a studio in Bay Ridge, Brooklyn, and made her Broadway debut as a teenager in Kurt Weill's One Touch of Venus.

She went on to replace Sono Osato as Ivy in On the Town, then played Amy Spettigue in the 1948 Broadway production of Where's Charley? (Theatre World Award).

A life member of The Actors Studio, McLerie's other Broadway credits include Miss Liberty, the drama Time Limit, Redhead (understudying Gwen Verdon), and West Side Story.

McLerie's film roles include Amy in Where's Charley? (1952); Katie Brown in Calamity Jane (1953); Shirley in They Shoot Horses, Don't They? (1969); and The Crazy Woman in Jeremiah Johnson (1972). Other film work includes Phantom of the Rue Morgue (1954), The Cowboys (1972), The Way We Were (1973), Cinderella Liberty (1973), All the President's Men (1976), and TV movies such as Born Innocent (1974) and Death Scream (1975).

She enjoyed a long career as a character actress on television, making frequent guest appearances on shows such as Bonanza, The Waltons, The Love Boat, Barney Miller, Benson, Hart to Hart, St. Elsewhere, and Dynasty, among many others. She played Miss Janet Reubner, Tony Randall's acerbic and priggish secretary, on The Tony Randall Show (1976–78).

McLerie played the recurring role of Arthur Carlson's wife Carmen on WKRP in Cincinnati (1978–82). Though then in her mid-fifties, McLerie was playing a character about a decade younger, as Carmen gave birth to a daughter in a 1980 episode. McLerie also appeared in three episodes of Punky Brewster alongside her husband, George Gaynes (1984). She later appeared as Florence Bickford, the title character's mother on The Days and Nights of Molly Dodd (1987–91). Her last role was on an episode of Brooklyn Bridge in 1993.

=== Personal life ===
McLerie's first marriage was to the lyricist/librettist Adolph Green from 1945 until their divorce in May 1953. She then married actor George Gaynes in 1953. Their marriage lasted until his death in 2016. The couple had two children.

McLerie died at her home in North Bend, Washington, on May 21, 2018, at the age of 91, from Alzheimer's disease.

== Filmography ==
Year	Title	Role	Notes
1948	Words and Music	Singer in Garrick Gaeities	uncredited
1952	Where's Charley?	Amy Spettigue	
1952	The Desert Song	Azuri	
1953	Calamity Jane	Katie Brown	
1954	Phantom of the Rue Morgue	Yvonne	
1955	Battle Cry	Ruby – Waitress in Diner	
1962	40 Pounds of Trouble	Blanchard's secretary	uncredited
1969	They Shoot Horses, Don't They?	Shirl	
1969	The Reivers	Alison McCaslin	
1970	Monte Walsh	Mary Eagle	
1972	The Cowboys	Ellen Price	
1972	Jeremiah Johnson	Crazy Woman	
1972	The Magnificent Seven Ride!	Mrs. Donavan	
1973	Howzer	Faye Carsell	
1973	The Way We Were	Rhea Edwards	
1973	Cinderella Liberty	Miss Watkins	
1974	France société anonyme	L'Américaine	
1974	Born Innocent	Emma Lasko	TV movie
1975	Death Scream	Alice Whitmore	TV movie
1976	All the President's Men	Carolyn Abbott	
1983	Living Proof: The Hank Williams, Jr. Story	Audrey Williams	TV movie
1983	The Thorn Birds	Mrs. Smith	TV miniseries
1994	Police Academy: Mission to Moscow	Irina Petrovskaya	uncredited
