= Globe Theatre (Newcastle Street) =

Victorian London theatre demolished in 1902

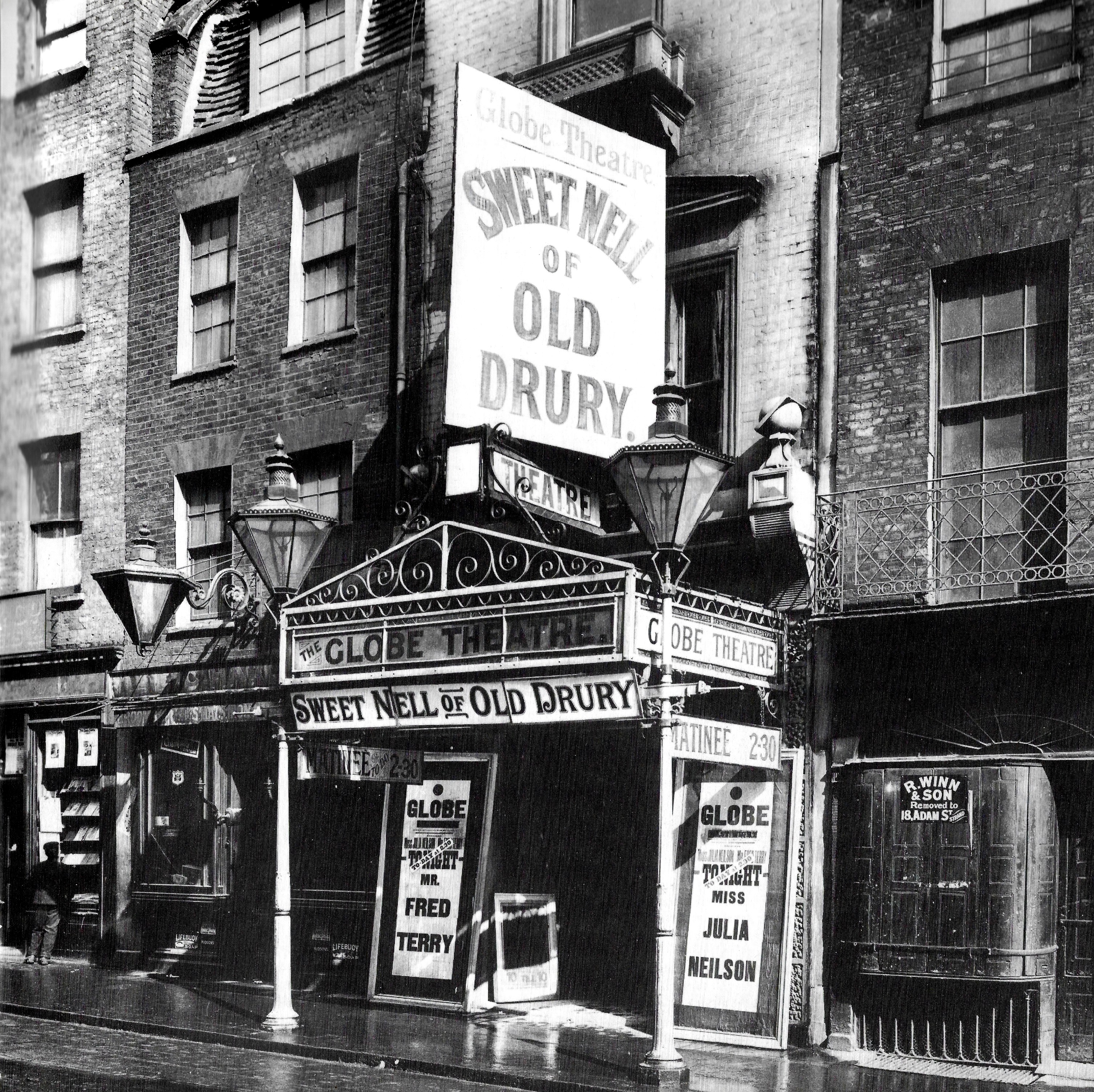
- Exterior, 1902, during the run of the last play presented at the theatre
- Interactive map of Globe Theatre
- Address: Newcastle Street (Aldwych); Westminster, London
- Coordinates: 51.513056°N 0.118611°W
- Capacity: 1,800
- Designation: Demolished
- Current use: Site occupied by Bush House

Construction
- Opened: 1868
- Closed: 1902
- Rebuilt: 1870 Walter Emden

The Globe was a Victorian theatre built in 1868 and demolished in 1902. It was the third of five London theatres to bear the name, following Shakespeare’s Bankside house, which closed in 1642, and the former Rotunda Theatre in Blackfriars Road, which for a few years from 1833 was renamed the Globe. The new theatre was also known at various times as the Royal Globe Theatre or Globe Theatre Royal. Its repertoire consisted mainly of comedies and musical shows.

The theatre's most famous production was Charley's Aunt by Brandon Thomas, which enjoyed a record-setting run there, having transferred from the Royalty Theatre. Other long-running pieces included the opéra-comique The Chimes of Normandy (1878) and the farce The Private Secretary (1884). The Globe was one of four theatres demolished in 1902 to make way for the Aldwych and Kingsway development.

== History ==
=== Background and first years ===
The Globe in 1869

In the 16th century Lyon's Inn, one of the Inns of Chancery attached to London's Inner Temple, stood on the site. By the 1860s the area had deteriorated greatly and the old inn had been converted into what the historians Mander and Mitchenson describe as "dwellings of a dubious nature". In 1864 part of the area was cleared to make way for a new hotel, which failed, and the Globe Theatre, which was built to the commission of its proprietor, Sefton Parry. He designed the theatre himself; the builder was G. Simpson. The Globe stood on the corner of Wych and Newcastle Streets.

Parry built the theatre cheaply, hoping to make handsome profits from compensation when the area was demolished, which was even then in contemplation. It remained in contemplation for more than thirty years. From 1870 the Globe backed on to another theatre owned by Parry, the even more jerry-built Opera Comique. The two theatres were known as "the rickety twins": both were of such flimsy construction that performers could hear each other through the common wall. Nevertheless, the auditorium of the Globe was richly decorated, and much praised by contemporary reviewers.

The Era, reporting on the new theatre in November 1868, quoted the capacity as 1,800, including standing room; the seating capacity was 1,510 plus eight private boxes. Acknowledging the history of the title "Globe Theatre", the new house featured an act-drop representing a view of Stratford-Upon-Avon. That act-drop was destroyed in a fire before the opening night, and replaced by another with a view of Anne Hathaway's cottage.

Parry's first production, a five-act comedy called Cyril's Success, by H. J. Byron, was well received, and ran for 100 performances – considered a very good run for that period. Later productions staged by Parry were unsuccessful, and he gave up the management of the Globe in 1870.

=== 1870s ===
The Private Secretary (1884)

Charley's Aunt (1892)

Sweet Nell of Old Drury (1902)

The Globe was taken over and partially rebuilt only two years after its opening. The architect was Walter Emden, whose surviving London theatres are the Duke of York's, and (in collaboration) the Garrick and Royal Court theatres. Old and New London described the theatre thus:

The auditorium is effectively decorated in relief, and has a domed ceiling, with a sunlight in the centre. The site having been excavated very considerably for the proposed hotel [an abandoned project], the floor of the pit has been made many feet below the line of the street, and is ,, by a steep flight of steps from Wych Street. In Wych Street also are the entrances to the gallery stairs, and that to the "royal box." The ordinary boxes are entered from Newcastle Street, and are on a level with the street, so that stairs are avoided. Here, too, enter the occupants of the stalls. The seats are all fairly commodious, and conveniently placed, so that all that is passing on the stage can be distinctly seen and heard from any part of the house.

The "sunlight" referred to above was a glass roof giving the auditorium natural light, day and night, and allowing ventilation at all times: in an age of gas lighting, the latter would have been a marked advantage. By contrast, at the adjoining Opera Comique audiences "perspired and gasped."

The rebuilt theatre came under a succession of managements through the 1870s, with few successes. For a season of opéra bouffe in 1871, for which "Royal" was added to the theatre's name, standards were not high enough to attract the public, and a new management took over. H. J. Montague opened with a strong company, headed by himself, Carlotta Addison and Henry Compton, but could not make the theatre pay. He was succeeded by Alexander Henderson, who presented his wife, Lydia Thompson, in a long-running burlesque, Blue Beard. A substantial success in the 1870s was the opéra comique Les cloches de Corneville by Robert Planquette, given in an English version by H. B. Farnie and Robert Reece under the title The Chimes of Normandy. It transferred from the smaller Folly Theatre, and ran for a total of 705 performances, setting a new world record for a musical theatre run, which was not overtaken until Dorothy, ten years later.

=== 1880s ===
The early years of the decade brought the Globe little success. A comic opera in an attempted Gilbert and Sullivan vein, The Vicar of Bray, by Sydney Grundy and Edward Solomon (1882) ran for only 69 performances, (Note: The piece fared better when revived by Richard D'Oyly Carte at the Savoy Theatre in 1892, when it ran for 143 performances.) and The Promise of May, a "Rustic Drama in Prose" by the Poet Laureate, Lord Tennyson, lasted only a few nights.

In 1884 the theatre (temporarily called the Royal Globe) had a solid success with The Private Secretary, a farce by and starring Charles Hawtrey (transferred from The Prince of Wales's Theatre in 1884; it ran for 785 performances. Hawtrey then presented other plays at the Globe with varying degrees of success. In the later years of the decade the house saw two Shakespeare seasons, the first led by Richard Mansfield and the second by Frank Benson.

=== 1890–1902 ===
Success on an even greater scale than that of The Private Secretary came to the Globe in 1892, when the farce Charley's Aunt transferred there after a few initial weeks in the smaller Royalty Theatre. It ran for a total of 1,466 performances. (Note: This, a world record for a theatre run, stood for fifty years, until passed by Noël Coward's Blithe Spirit which ran for 1,997 performances in the West End between July 1941 and March 1946.) John Hare took over the theatre after the end of that run. He brought Kate Terry out of retirement to support the stage debut of her daughter Mabel Terry-Lewis in The Master by Stuart Ogilvie, presented revivals of Tom Robertson's Caste, School and Ours, and premiered Arthur Pinero's comedy The Gay Lord Quex, which ran for 300 performances. (Note: Pinero's play was regarded as the most daring of its day: it was the first play in the British theatre in which women smoked on stage.)

By the time Hare gave up the management of the Globe in 1900 the long-envisaged Strand Improvement Scheme was finally under way, and the demolition of "the rickety twins" was scheduled by the London County Council. The last company to occupy the theatre was headed by Fred Terry and Julia Neilson, with William Greet as lessee and Frank Curzon managing the house. They presented a melodrama about Russian politics, which failed completely, and for the final production at the Globe they revived a popular costume drama, Sweet Nell of Old Drury. The theatre closed in 1902 and was demolished the same year to make way for the construction of Aldwych and Kingsway development, along with the Gaiety, Olympic, Opera Comique. Bush House now stands on the site.

=== Other "Globe" theatres ===
This Globe was the third of five London theatres to bear the name, following Shakespeare’s Bankside house, which closed in 1642, and the former Rotunda Theatre in Blackfriars Road, which for a few years from 1833 was renamed the Globe. Two later London theatres were given the name. The Hicks Theatre in Shaftesbury Avenue, opened in 1906, was renamed the Globe in 1909 and continued under that name until 1994, when it was renamed the Gielgud Theatre. A recreation of Shakespeare's theatre opened in Southwark in 1997 and was given the name Shakespeare's Globe.

== Notes, references and sources ==
=== Sources ===
- Bond, Jessie; Ethel Macgeorge (1930). The Life and Reminiscences of Jessie Bond: the old Savoyard: as told by herself to Ethel Macgeorge. London: John Lane. OCLC 270109476.
- Dawick, John (1993). Pinero: A Theatrical Life. Niwot: University of Colorado Press. ISBN 978-0-87081-302-3.
- Gaye, Freda, ed. (1967). Who's Who in the Theatre (fourteenth ed.). London: Sir Isaac Pitman and Sons. OCLC 5997224.
- Goodman, Andrew (1988). Gilbert and Sullivan's London. London: Spellmount. ISBN 978-0-946771-31-8.
- Mander, Raymond; Joe Mitchenson (1976) [1968]. Lost Theatres of London (second ed.). London: New English Library. ISBN 978-0-450-02838-0.
- Parker, John, ed. (1925). Who's Who in the Theatre (fifth ed.). London: Sir Isaac Pitman and Sons. OCLC 10013159.
- Rollins, Cyril; R. John Witts (1962). The D'Oyly Carte Opera Company in Gilbert and Sullivan Operas: A Record of Productions, 1875–1961. London: Michael Joseph. OCLC 504581419.
- Thornbury, Walter (1897). Old and New London. London: British History. OCLC 76815192.
- Traubner, Richard (2016). Operetta: A Theatrical History. London: Routledge. ISBN 978-1-138-13892-6.
- Weinreb, Ben; Christopher Hibbert; Julia Keay; John Keay (2008). The London Encyclopaedia (third ed.). London: Macmillan. ISBN 978-1-4050-4924-5.
