= Charley's Aunt (1915 film) =

- Based on: Charley's Aunt by Brandon Thomas
- Starring: Oliver Hardy
- Release date: 1915
- Country: United States

Charley's Aunt is a 1915 American film. The film is based on the 1892 play Charley's Aunt by Brandon Thomas.

== Cast ==
- Lynne Carver
- Oliver Hardy
