= Tatyana Vedeneyeva =

Soviet and Russian actress

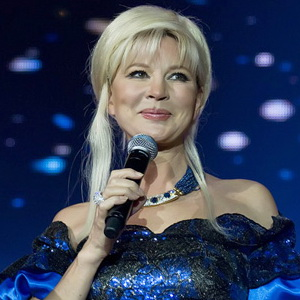
- Vedeneyeva at the "Legends of Retro FM 2009" festival in Saint Petersburg, 2009.
- Born: Tatyana Veniaminovna Vedeneyeva; July 10, 1953 (age 73); Stalingrad, Russian SFSR, Soviet Union
- Other name: Aunt Tania
- Occupations: Actress, TV personality, journalist
- Years active: 1973–present

Tatyana Veniaminovna Vedeneyeva (Russian: Татьяна Вениаминовна Веденеева; born 10 July 1953) is a widely known Soviet and Russian actress and an anchor for the Soviet children's program Good Night, Little Ones!. Honored Artist of Russia (2021).

== Biography ==
She was born in Stalingrad, on July 10, 1953.

In 1972, she moved to Moscow and enrolled into Russian Academy of Theatre Arts (locally, GITIS). While attending the academy, she debuted in several motion pictures such as Hello, I'm Your Aunt! (1975) among the few. Upon graduation, Vedeneyeva was invited to the Mayakovsky Theatre, but soon was fired for not having a residential permission (propiska). She became well known amongst the Soviet children of 70s and 80s for her leading role in children programs Good Night, Little Ones!, and Visiting a Fairy Land (V gostiakh u skazki) as "Aunt Tania". She was also a presenter on the BBC's televised Russian language course for beginners, Russian Language and People (1980).

In 1986, in Japan, she hosted an educational and entertainment program for the study of the Russian language on the NHK Educational TV. Later Vedeneyeva led various other TV shows and concert events and was amongst the most popular in the Union. In 1993 was forced to resign.

She moved to France with her husband where she lived until 1999. In 2000, Vedeneyeva returned to TV. She also guest appeared on American TV in 1988.

== Selected filmography ==
- Much Ado About Nothing as Gero (1973)
- Sergeant of militsiya as Natasha (1974)
- How do you do, doctor (1974)
- Hello, I'm Your Aunt! as Ella Delei (1975)
- That we didn't cover (1975)
- Sibir (1976)
- Fantaziya (1976)
