= Charley's Aunt (1941 film) =

1941 film by Archie Mayo

- Directed by: Archie Mayo
- Written by: George Seaton
- Based on: Charley's Aunt by Brandon Thomas
- Produced by: William Perlberg
- Starring: Jack Benny; Kay Francis; James Ellison
- Cinematography: J. Peverell Marley
- Edited by: Robert Bischoff
- Music by: Alfred Newman
- Production company: Twentieth Century Fox
- Distributed by: Twentieth Century Fox
- Release date: August 1, 1941 (US)
- Running time: 80 minutes
- Country: United States
- Language: English
- Budget: $889,300
- Box office: $2,278,200

Charley's Aunt is a 1941 American historical comedy film directed by Archie Mayo. It stars Jack Benny and Kay Francis. It was the fourth American filmed version of the 1892 stage farce of the same name by Brandon Thomas. It remained one of Benny's personal favourites among his own films.

== Plot ==
Act I

Oxford University, 1890. Lord Fancourt Babberley (Babbs) is pending expulsion for "disgraceful conduct" at a cricket match, having unintentionally hit Professor Redcliffe with a cricket ball and spilt tea on him. Worse, in pursuit of the mischievous friend who tripped him, Babbs stumbled down steps—clutching at a rope to steady himself—and inadvertently rang a fire bell. Redfield decides to expel him, citing a 15-year limit to earn a degree. Claiming he is "only" in his 10th year, Babbs asserts that Charley Wykeham and Jack Chesney will corroborate the accidental ringing of the fire bell.

Charley and Jack are in love, respectively, with Kitty Verdun and Amy Spettigue. Charley receives word that his aunt, Donna Lucia d'Alvadorez, a rich widow from Brazil whom he has never met, is coming to visit him. The boys invite Amy and Kitty to lunch to meet her.

Donna Lucia's solicitor, Hilary Babberley, informs her that her nephew Charley loves the ward of the unsavory Mr. Spettigue. As Charley's only relative, Donna Lucia, a beautiful woman in early middle age, intends to investigate. The solicitor gives her a letter of introduction to his nephew, Babbs, who will escort her around Oxford. Since Babbs is Charley's friend, Donna Lucia will call herself "Mrs. Beverly Smythe" to hide her identity from Babbs and Charley.

Receiving an unexpected visit from his father, Sir Francis Chesney, Jack learns his father has inherited heavy debts. Jack suggests that Sir Francis marry Donna Lucia to clear the family debts. Sir Francis is hesitant but agrees to meet Donna Lucia.

Charley receives a telegram that Donna Lucia is delayed for a few days. The boys panic; the girls won't visit without a proper chaperone. Fortunately, Babbs is playing an old lady in a play, and they suggest he use his costume to impersonate Donna Lucia. Babbs refuses, but Charley and Jack will not vouch for him with Redcliffe unless Babbs complies. They introduce Babbs in drag to the girls as Charley's aunt ("from Brazil—where the nuts come from!").

Meeting "Donna Lucia", Sir Francis cringes at the sight of "her." Spettigue arrives, angry Kitty and Amy are lunching with the boys without his permission. To protect the salary that would stop if his charges were to marry, Spettigue keeps suitors away from the girls. Upon learning that Charley's aunt is rich, Spettigue competes with Sir Francis for "Donna Lucia."

Act II

Motivated by money, Sir Francis intends to propose marriage to Donna Lucia. Jack urgently corners Babbs, ordering him to refuse his father gently. Babbs does so, which Sir Francis accepts gracefully.

Meanwhile, the real Donna Lucia arrives, presenting to Babbs (in male attire) the letter of introduction from his uncle. "Mrs. Smythe" observes flirtatiously that Babbs is older than expected, and he replies approvingly that she is younger than anticipated. When Charley informs "Mrs. Smythe" that Charley's "old aunt from Brazil" is visiting, Mrs. Smythe is keen to meet "her."

Jack and Charley declare their love to their girls and discover that they need Spettigue's consent to marry, in writing, so he cannot disclaim consent. They enlist Babbs—as Donna Lucia—to get consent by pretending to agree to marry Spettigue. At tea, Babbs, as "Donna Lucia", is introduced to Mrs. Smythe; she begins to see through Babb's disguise.

Act III

That evening at dinner with all the key players, Mrs. Smythe embarrasses "Donna Lucia" by exposing how little "she" knows about Brazil, coffee, and "her late husband", Don Pedro. In private, she reveals to Babbs that she has known who he is for hours.

By accepting marriage as "Donna Lucia", Babbs tricks Spettigue into giving the letter of consent for the marriages of his charges. Holding the letter, Babbs backs into a statue that snags his wig, exposing him as male. Spettigue declares the letter of consent invalid, since it is addressed to Donna Lucia d'Alvadorez. The real Donna Lucia takes the letter from Babb's hand and reveals her identity, stating that the letter "has been delivered to Donna Lucia d'Alvadorez".

Donna Lucia tells Babbs he is to handle her financial affairs in the future. Babbs replies that Charley may end up having to call him "uncle".

== Cast ==
- Jack Benny as Babbs Babberly
- Kay Francis as Donna Lucia d'Alvadorez
- James Ellison as Jack Chesney
- Anne Baxter as Amy Spettigue
- Edmund Gwenn as Stephen Spettigue
- Laird Cregar as Sir Francis Chesney
- Reginald Owen as Redcliffe
- Arleen Whelan as Kitty Verdun
- Richard Haydn as Charley Wyckham
- Ernest Cossart as Brasset
- Morton Lowry as Harley Stafford
- Will Stanton as Messenger
- Lionel Pape as Hilary Babberly
- C. Montague Shaw as Elderly Professor
- Maurice Cass as Octogenarian Professor
- Claud Allister as Cricket Match Spectator
- William Austin as Cricket Match Spectator
- Brandon Hurst as Coach (uncredited)

== Reception ==
=== Box office ===
The film was the 8th most popular movie at the US box office in 1941.

It earned a profit of $772,800.

=== Critical ===
- In a review contemporary with the film's original release, a critic in The New York Times wrote "when the Benny physiognomy peered impishly from behind a lacy fan, the audience held its sides, and when in the final scene his wig vanished to leave his masculine coiffure stark naked, there was a roar of laughter that must have shaken the Roxy's rococo ceiling".
- According to TV Guide, "Jack Benny was never better (with the possible exception of his classic To Be or Not to Be) and carries the film with a top-flight performance. This was his first role of any consequence other than his previous tailor-made parts with radio jokes flying thick and fast around his well-known persona."

The film was promoted on The Jell-o Program, the name for Benny's radio show at the time. The plot of the 18 May 1941 episode sees the cast visit Jack "on-set". One gag sees Benny's contract require him to feed Darryl F. Zanuck's horse.
