= The Private Secretary (play) =

1883 play by Sir Charles Henry Hawtrey

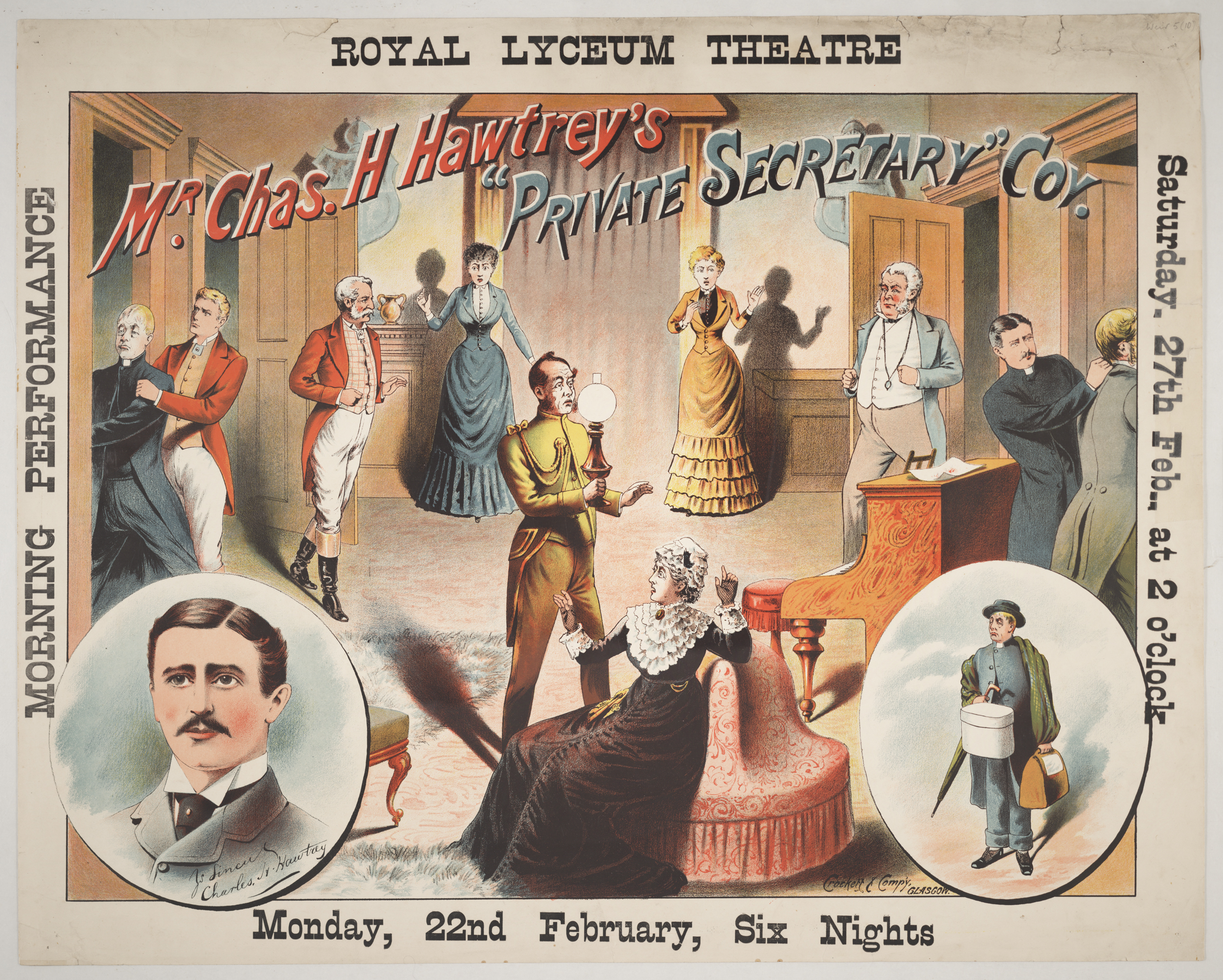
Poster from a performance at the Royal Lyceum Theatre, Edinburgh in 1886

The Private Secretary is an 1883 farce in three acts, by Charles Hawtrey. The play, adapted from a German original, depicts the vicissitudes of a mild young clergyman, innocently caught up in the machinations of two irresponsible young men who are bent on escaping their creditors.

When the play opened in London, the notices for the piece were hostile, and it was seen as a stop-gap in the schedule of the theatrical company presenting it. Despite these predictions, the play ran in London for a total of 1,469 performances in its first run and later revivals. The critics found much more to praise in the performances of the cast, with particular praise for Herbert Beerbohm Tree as the meek clergyman, the Rev Robert Spalding. He was succeeded in the role by W. S. Penley, who received equally good notices, and played the part in several productions. The play was frequently revived in the first half of the 20th century, and was adapted for film in 1935.

== History ==
The play was adapted by the young actor Charles Hawtrey from the German Der Bibliothekar, a comedy by Gustav von Moser. The play ran at the Cambridge Royal Theatre in 1883, was brought to London in 1884, and ran there until 1886. Hawtrey revived the play twice, in 1892 at the Comedy Theatre, and in 1895 at the Avenue Theatre. His profits were estimated by The Idler to be around £100,000.

Actors who played the Rev Robert Spalding included Herbert Beerbohm Tree, W. S. Penley, Frank Thornton, and James Finlayson. Edward Everett Horton played Spalding in the 1935 British film version of the play, directed by Henry Edwards.

== Original cast ==
W. S. Penley as the Rev Robert Spalding

- Mr Marsland, MFH – A. Beaumont
- Harry Marsland – H. Reeves Smith
- Mr Cattermole – W. J. Hill
- Douglas Cattermole – R. C. Carlton
- Rev Robert Spalding – Herbert Beerbohm Tree
- Mr Sidney Gibson – G. W. Anson
- John – G. Ogilvy
- Knox – Mr Chalinor
- Porter – Mr Hilton
- Gardener – H Parry
- Edith Marsland – Lucy Buckstone
- Eva Webster – Miss Tilbury
- Mrs Stead – Mrs Leigh Murray
- Miss Ashford – Mrs Stephens

Source: The Era

== Plot ==
Two impecunious young men of good family, Harry Marsland and Douglas Cattermole, plot to escape their creditors with the unwitting help of the innocent young clergyman, Robert Spalding. Harry's uncle has engaged Spalding – whom he has not met – as his private secretary; Douglas takes Spalding's place, passing himself off as Spalding while leaving the real one in London to take charge of Douglas's chambers. Cattermole senior, Douglas's uncle newly returned from India, calls at the chambers; he takes Spalding to be his nephew and is disgusted at his meek and mild manner.

At Squire Marsland's country house, Douglas – posing as Spalding – is joined by Harry. Their attempt to avoid their creditors is foiled when Mr Gibson, their principal creditor, arrives, and threatens to reveal their machinations to Mr Marsland. To placate him they play on his intense snobbery, and invite him to stay as a guest in the Squire's house. Cattermole senior is already a guest there. Old Mr Marsland, unconvinced that Cattermole junior can be such a milksop as his uncle thinks him, sends a telegraph to Douglas's chambers as a result of which the real Spalding hurries down to the house. His presence threatens to undermine Harry and Douglas's deception, and he is harried by the two of them. He is hidden in one room after another, under a table, in an oak chest, and behind the curtains. His ordeal is ended when Gibson, who has got drunk and been asked to leave the house, reveals the truth about the identities of Douglas and Spalding. This greatly pleases old Cattermole, who realises that his nephew is not saintly and ineffectual but an impudent young man after his own heart, and worthy to be his heir. Douglas pairs off with old Marsland's daughter Edith, and Harry with her friend Eva.

== Critical reception ==
The reviews for the piece were generally unfavourable. The Times thought it "at best but a stop-gap affording little opportunity for a display of the undoubted ability of the company". The Observer commented that the play "only entertains its hearers by fits and starts … a purposeless romp, no matter how spiritedly it is conducted, cannot last for four acts without becoming tedious to all concerned." The Pall Mall Gazette thought that the piece dragged badly, but suggested that there was enough comic material to make a good play after a thorough revision. The Era also thought the piece too lengthy for its material, and said that it could not predict a long run for the play, despite a good deal that was "exceedingly amusing". The Morning Post remarked, "Instead of light comedy we get heavy horseplay." The critics were similarly of the same mind about the performances, giving particular praise to Tree as the hapless Spalding. The Times said that he convulsed the house with laughter at every turn, and The Era observed, "we can promise our readers a hearty laugh" at his performance.

Hawtrey revised the play, reducing it to three acts, and the following year The Manchester Guardian said, "No smarter bit of work has been seen for a long time than Mr Hawtrey's comedy. The fun is distinctly fresh, and it is crisp and clean-cut all through". The play was frequently revived during the first half of the 20th century. In 1927 The Times commented that history had not borne out its original harsh verdict, and that audiences still laughed throughout the play, which demonstrated its continuing strength after more than forty years. In 1946 the critic Allardyce Nicoll commented that the play "coldly regarded in the script, seems utterly beneath contempt" but that its extraordinary success showed that it "formed a not entirely despicable medium for farcical interpretation." Nicoll bracketed the piece with a later long-running farce, Charley's Aunt.

== Sources ==
- Nicoll, Allardyce (1946). A history of late nineteenth century drama, Volume 1. CUP Archive.
- Schumacher, Claude (1996). Naturalism and Symbolism in European Theatre 1850-1918. Cambridge University Press. ISBN 9780521230148.
