= Where's Charley? =

Musical by Frank Loesser

- Logo
- Music: Frank Loesser
- Lyrics: Frank Loesser
- Book: George Abbott
- Basis: Brandon Thomas's play Charley's Aunt
- Productions: 1948 Broadway; 1951 Broadway revival 1952 Film; 1958 West End; 1974 Broadway revival

Where's Charley? is a musical with music and lyrics by Frank Loesser and book by George Abbott. The story was based on the 1892 play Charley's Aunt by Brandon Thomas. The musical debuted on Broadway in 1948 and was revived on Broadway and in the West End. Ray Bolger starred, and sang the popular song "Once in Love with Amy".

== Plot ==
Act I
The setting is Oxford University in the year 1892 where a group of college seniors are bidding farewell to the years gone by ("The Years Before Us"). In his dorm room, graduating Jack Chesney is excitedly talking with his butler, Brassett, making sure that luncheon will be ready for later that afternoon. He is so excited because his roommate, Charley Wykeham, has gone to the train station to meet his aunt, Donna Lucia D'Alvadorez, who is coming in from Brazil for a visit. Having Charley's aunt there as chaperone will make it quite easy for their two girl friends, Kitty Verdun and Amy Spettigue, to come for a visit.

Charley does return – but without his aunt. Apparently, she never was on the train. After reading her letter more carefully, Charley realizes that he made a mistake – she will be coming on a later one. Not having Charley's aunt there will make it impossible for the girls to stay – no decent girl would remain with two young men unchaperoned. The girls arrive early, and just as expected decide they must leave – not seeing Charley's Aunt Donna Lucia. ("Better Get Out Of Here"). Actually, they are more worried about being caught by their guardian, Mr. Spettigue, (Amy's uncle) who keeps a tight rein on the girls. The girls do leave.

After the girls' departure, the boys are a bit depressed; nevertheless, they know that the girls will return when Charley's Aunt is there. In the meantime, Charley tries on his costume for the upcoming student production in which he is appearing. While Charley is doing this, Jack's father, Sir Francis Chesney, makes a surprise visit and informs his son that they are actually penniless. Jack suggests that possibly a wealthy marriage could alleviate their problems and suggests that Charley's rich widow Aunt Donna Lucia might just be the woman for his father to wed. All Sir Francis needs to do is charm her when she comes for lunch later that day. The plan seems to be perfect.

After Jack's father leaves, Charley re-enters in costume rehearsing his lines for the school play. It appears that he will be playing a rather mature older woman – much like his Aunt Donna Lucia. Just then, he is informed by telegram that his aunt will not be arriving for lunch. Instead, she will surprise him at a later date. Jack is upset most of all because this will be his last chance to propose to Kitty – tomorrow she leaves for Scotland. The young ladies unexpectedly appear again assuming that a chaperone is there, and in a fit of desperation, Jack suggests that Charley pose as his aunt – anyway he's wearing the costume right now. Charley does pose as his aunt and fools the girls. They cover for Charley saying that he's not feeling well and has retired to his room.

The girls' guardian, Mr. Spettigue, comes looking for the girls, and everyone rushes out to hide from him – everyone except Charley who stays to tell Mr. Spettigue that she is "the only young lady present." She finally hits him with her fan and says "Be gone my good man and don't bother me any longer." Utterly baffled and confused, Mr. Spettigue leaves, and the girls and Jack return. Sir Francis then enters the scene and escorts Charley to lunch all ready to woo a rich woman into marriage. Just then, Mr. Spettigue re-enters and sees the girls there just as he suspected. He is quite angry until he learns that this "woman/chaperone" who dismissed him only a few moments earlier is actually the wealthy Donna Lucia D'Alvadorez from Brazil – "where the nuts come from." He, too, is smitten by this rich available widow and is ready to make his move. Together, Sir Francis, Charley, and Mr. Spettigue go off to lunch. It's Charley's job to keep them occupied. Jack, Kitty, and Amy all go off to watch the parade and look for Charley.

The scene shifts to a street where the students' band is marching. Everyone is excited by what they hear and see. ("The New Ashmolean Marching Society and Students' Conservatory Band")

In a garden, Charley is returning from having just entertained both men. Charley is ready to change back into his regular clothes and go and find Amy who must be wondering where he is. Jack is still frantic and begs Charley to continue for a short while longer so he can talk with Kitty. Charley doesn't care – he has had just about all he can take and goes off to change and find Amy. Kitty comes looking for Donna Lucia, but instead finds herself alone with Jack. It is there that the two are finally able to express their undying love and devotion for each other ("My Darling, My Darling").

Jack's father finds Kitty and Jack together and asks that he speak with his son. It appears that he is going to take his son's advice and marry Donna Lucia. Jack tells him that this is impossible; however, Sir Francis is now more determined than ever. Charley then appears as himself and finally gets to talk with Amy. He apologizes for his absence, and rushes to talk to Amy about their future together before her uncle returns and whisks her away. While Charley only wishes to propose marriage and speak of a future together, Amy only wants to speak of the future – a time of progress with wireless telegraphy, horseless carriages, and stereopticons that move. ("Make A Miracle")

Mr. Spettigue enters to find Amy with Charley and tells her to collect her things. They are leaving for good! He has been waiting for far too long for Donna Lucia, and is now ready to take Amy home. In a desperate moment, Charley tells Mr. Spettigue that his aunt really is in love with him. In fact, she's up in Charley's room right now resting from the emotional shock of meeting him. He knows that she'll be back soon. It's just that she has some business to attend to – like writing letters to her banks. The greedy Mr. Spettigue agrees to wait and ponders his possible future and fortune with Lucia ("Serenade with Asides")

Charley returns as Donna Lucia, and chases Mr. Spettigue around the garden. In the midst of all this, Jack informs Charley that his father is going to propose to him. In fact, Sir Francis enters and asks Charley to marry him. Charley turns him down, but runs off again as he hears a playful Mr. Spettigue approaching.

In the midst of all this, a woman (Charley's real aunt) enters and approaches Sir Francis about finding Charley. As the two look at each other, they realize that they know each other from more than twenty years ago. Sir Francis doesn't know that she is actually Charley's rich Aunt Donna Lucia; in fact, he points out to her that Charley's aunt is right there with them – running around being chased by Mr. Spettigue. She is quite intrigued by it all, and poses as Mrs. Beverly Smythe to better survey the situation. The two then look at each other once more and recall that time long ago when they first met. ("Lovelier Than Ever").

Jack and Charley are going over things, and Kitty and Amy enter to inform Jack that the only way they'll get to marry the girls is to get Mr. Spettigue's consent in writing. The girls also confide in Charley that they are actually really in love with Charley and Jack, but if they don't get consent to the marriages in writing from Mr. Spettigue, they will be financially cut off for good. Charley agrees to get the written consent from Mr. Spettigue and goes off to do so. Kitty and Jack leave Amy alone to think about Charley and all that is happening. Just where has Charley been? She's crazy about him, but can't help thinking that he's off with another girl – possibly the girl she saw in a picture sitting on his piano. ("The Woman In His Room")

Brassett enters and sets tea. Charley returns still dressed as his aunt and tells Amy that Charley has sent a message to her – he loves her very much. Sir Francis and the real Donna Lucia (still posing as Beverly Smythe) enter and unexpectedly join them for tea. During a madcap tea party, Donna Lucia presses Charley for information about his/her life in Brazil. Charley tells her about the place where Donna Lucia lived – Pernambuco. A song and ballet sequence (seen through Charley's eyes) revealing just how Donna Lucia and her rich husband met and lived together ends the first act. ("Pernambuco")

Act 2
The act opens with the Oxford senior graduates posing for their class picture – complete with caps and gowns. They are all there except for Charley. He promised that he'd be there. ("Where's Charley?") Fortunately, he does make it there – just as the picture is being taken.

Walking along a street, Charley tries to explain all of his disappearances to Amy, who tries her best to believe him. She also tells him that her uncle is ready to sign a wedding consent form, but Donna Lucia must meet him to get the document. Charley assures her that "she'll" be there, but also tells her that he can't be there at the same time. She doesn't quite know what is going on; however, she trusts him and is excited about marrying him. She leaves Charley alone, and there on that street he thinks about Amy – the most wonderful girl in the whole world ("Once in Love with Amy")

Later that day, the girls are in the dressing room preparing themselves for the evening's big dance. While dressing and primping, they also go over all of the most recent events. ("The Gossips") Kitty drags a reluctant Charley – once again dressed as Donna Lucia – to the dressing room. The real Donna Lucia enters and has a good bit of fun making Charley feel uncomfortable while all the ladies ready themselves for the evening's fun. The ladies eventually all leave and Charley is left alone to talk with Mr. Spettigue who comes to play with his new love. Charley fights off Mr. Spettigue's forced advances and finally demands that he be given the letter of consent that has been promised all along. If Mr. Spettigue goes and gets the letter right now, Charley promises that they can announce their own engagement at the ball. Mr. Spettigue excitedly, dashes off to get the letter and meet his love at the ball.

Strolling down a garden path Donna Lucia asks Sir Francis if it isn't strange that they have never seen Charley and his aunt together at the same time. Sir Francis has no interest in any of that. All he cares about is dancing the night away with his long lost love. The same is true of Jack and Kitty. In fact, everyone is dancing the night away in love ("Red Rose Cotillion") Charley even makes an appearance as himself to keep poor little Amy happy and content.

Mr. Spettigue finally appears and announces the engagement of Kitty and Amy to Jack and Charley. He gives Charley (again dressed as his aunt) the letter of consent. Charley sneaks off and reappears as himself once more. Mr. Spettigue wants to see Charley's aunt one more time, so Charley goes to get her. Mr. Spettigue asks to see Charley, the nephew, once again, and a rather "tired" Charley dashes off to get him. While rushing, Jack accidentally steps on the hem of Charley's skirt and all is "revealed." Charley admits to Amy and everyone that he did it all because of love. Mr. Spettigue is angry and doesn't care that they are in love. Charley tells him that they have the letter of consent, which is all they need. Mr. Spettigue fights them by telling them that he will dispute this. The real Donna Lucia finally steps forward and says that indeed the letter of consent was addressed to her and is a legal document – and she puts her blessing on the wedding. There is nothing Spettigue or anyone can do. All is forgiven and everyone (except for Mr. Spettigue) is happy. (Reprise: "My Darling, My Darling")

== Characters ==
- Charley Wykeham – An Oxford University graduate. Charming, masculine, very comic, feckless, physical, fast-paced.
- Jack Chesney – Charley's best friend and roommate. An Oxford University graduate. Stubborn, impetuous, young and handsome.
- Amy Spettigue – Charley's girlfriend. Interested in science. Remains faithful to Charley despite his strange behavior. Sweet, clever, well-mannered.
- Kitty Verdun – Jack's refined, honest, slightly reckless girl.
- Mr. Spettigue – Amy's uncle – uptight, money-loving guardian of Amy & Kitty.
- Donna Lucia D'Alvadorez – Charley's aunt from Brazil. Poses as "Mrs. Beverly Smythe". An attractive, stylish globetrotter.
- Sir Francis Chesney – Jack's clueless single father. Recently found himself in financial difficulty.
- Reggie – Charley's rival for the affection of Amy. Crazy, stupid and tactless.
- Brasset – Jack's Butler
- Patricia – An Oxford graduate. Likes to gossip.
- Wilkinson – The director of Theatrics at Oxford.

== Musical numbers ==
Act 1

- Overture – Orchestra
- The Years Before Us – Male Chorus
- Better Get Out Of Here – Charley, Jack, Kitty, Amy
- The New Ashmolean Marching Society And Students' Conservatory Band – Ensemble
- My Darling, My Darling – Jack, Kitty
- Make A Miracle – Charley, Amy
- Serenade With Asides – Spettigue
- Lovelier Than Ever – Donna Lucia, Sir Francis, Ensemble
- The Woman In His Room – Amy
- Pernambuco – Ensemble

Act 2

- Where's Charley? – Jack, Reggie, Patricia, Ensemble
- Once In Love With Amy – Charley
- The Gossips – Patricia, Female Chorus
- At The Red Rose Cotillion – Jack, Kitty, Ensemble
- Finale – Company

== Productions ==
Broadway (1948 and 1951)
The musical opened on Broadway at the St. James Theatre on October 11, 1948, and ran for 792 performances. It was directed by George Abbott, choreographed by George Balanchine, with sets and costumes by David Ffolkes. The cast featured Ray Bolger as Charley Wykeham, Allyn McLerie as Amy Spettigue, Byron Palmer as Jack Chesney, Doretta Morrow as Kitty Verdun, Paul England as Sir Francis Chesney, and Horace Cooper as Mr Spettigue. Bolger won the Tony Award, Best Actor (Musical). His second-act song, "Once in Love with Amy", was a show-stopper, with audiences not only demanding that he sing it again, but even singing along.

The musical returned to Broadway at The Broadway Theatre for 48 performances, from January 29, 1951, to March 10, 1951, with Bolger, McLerie, and Cooper reprising their roles and Abbott directing.

West End (1958)
After a trial run at the Opera House in Manchester, the musical opened in the West End at the Palace Theatre on February 20, 1958, and ran for 404 performances. It was directed by William Chappell. The cast featured Norman Wisdom as Charley Wykeham, Pip Hinton as Amy Spettigue, Terence Cooper as Jack Chesney, Pamela Gale as Kitty Verdun, Jerry Desmonde as Sir Francis Chesney, and Felix Felton as Mr Spettigue.

Circle in the Square Broadway Revival (1974–75)
Circle in the Square produced a revival starring Raul Julia as part of its 1974-75 Broadway season. Julia received a Tony Award nomination for his performance.

Encores! (2011)
A semi-staged production of Where's Charley? was presented as part of New York City Center's Encores! series from March 17–20, 2011, featuring Rebecca Luker and Howard McGillin, and Rob McClure as Charley.

== Film ==
The 1952 Warner Brothers film was directed by David Butler. Some scenes in the movie were filmed in Oxford, England (where the story takes place), yet the movie makes almost no attempt to take advantage of these authentic locations. The film's cast starred Ray Bolger, Allyn Ann McLerie and Horace Cooper repeating their stage roles, and Robert Shackleton as Jack Chesney, Mary Germaine as Kitty Verdun, and Howard Marion-Crawford as Sir Francis Chesney. The movie ends with each of the principal cast members taking a curtain call.

When the film played at Radio City Music Hall in 1962, Robert Shackleton, the other male lead, whose second and final film this was, performed in the accompanying stage show.

As of 2018, the film remains unavailable for television or home video viewing. Warner Bros. and the Loesser estate have each expressed an interest in making the film available in the future.

== Audio recordings ==
An audio recording of the 1958 London production has been released, but no complete recording of the Broadway score ever appeared, due to the 1948 recording ban. Bolger and the cast recorded two songs for a 45-rpm single, "Once in Love With Amy" b/w "Make a Miracle" (Decca 1–191) and a 78-rpm record (Decca 40065). (This version of "Once in Love with Amy" appears on several Broadway CD anthologies.) A 1952 film was made by Warner Bros., featuring Bolger and other original cast members.

Johnny Mercer recorded a 78 RPM version of "The New Ashmolean Marching Society and Students' Conservatory Band" with Paul Whiteman and his Orchestra on Capitol Records #15385. (Reportedly the ghost of Elias Ashmole – for whom the Society and Museum are both named – was seen to smile upon hearing it).

== Awards and nominations ==
=== Original Broadway production ===
Year	Award	Category	Nominee	Result
1949	Tony Award	Best Actor in a Musical	Ray Bolger	Won
1949	Theatre World Award		Byron Palmer; Allyn Ann McLerie	Won

=== 1974 Broadway revival ===
Year	Award	Category	Nominee	Result
1975	Tony Award	Best Actor in a Musical	Raul Julia	Nominated
1975	Tony Award	Best Featured Actor in a Musical	Tom Aldredge	Nominated
1975	Tony Award	Best Featured Actress in a Musical	Taina Elg	Nominated
1975	Tony Award	Best Costume Design	Arthur Boccia	Nominated
1975	Tony Award	Best Choreography	Margo Sappington	Nominated
1975	Drama Desk Award	Outstanding Actor in a Musical	Raul Julia	Nominated
1975	Drama Desk Award	Outstanding Actress in a Musical	Marcia McClain	Nominated
1975	Drama Desk Award	Outstanding Featured Actor in a Musical	Jerry Lanning	Nominated
1975	Drama Desk Award	Outstanding Choreography	Margo Sappington	Nominated
1975	Theatre World Award		Marcia McClain	Won
