= Charley's Aunt (1930 film) =

1930 film by Al Christie

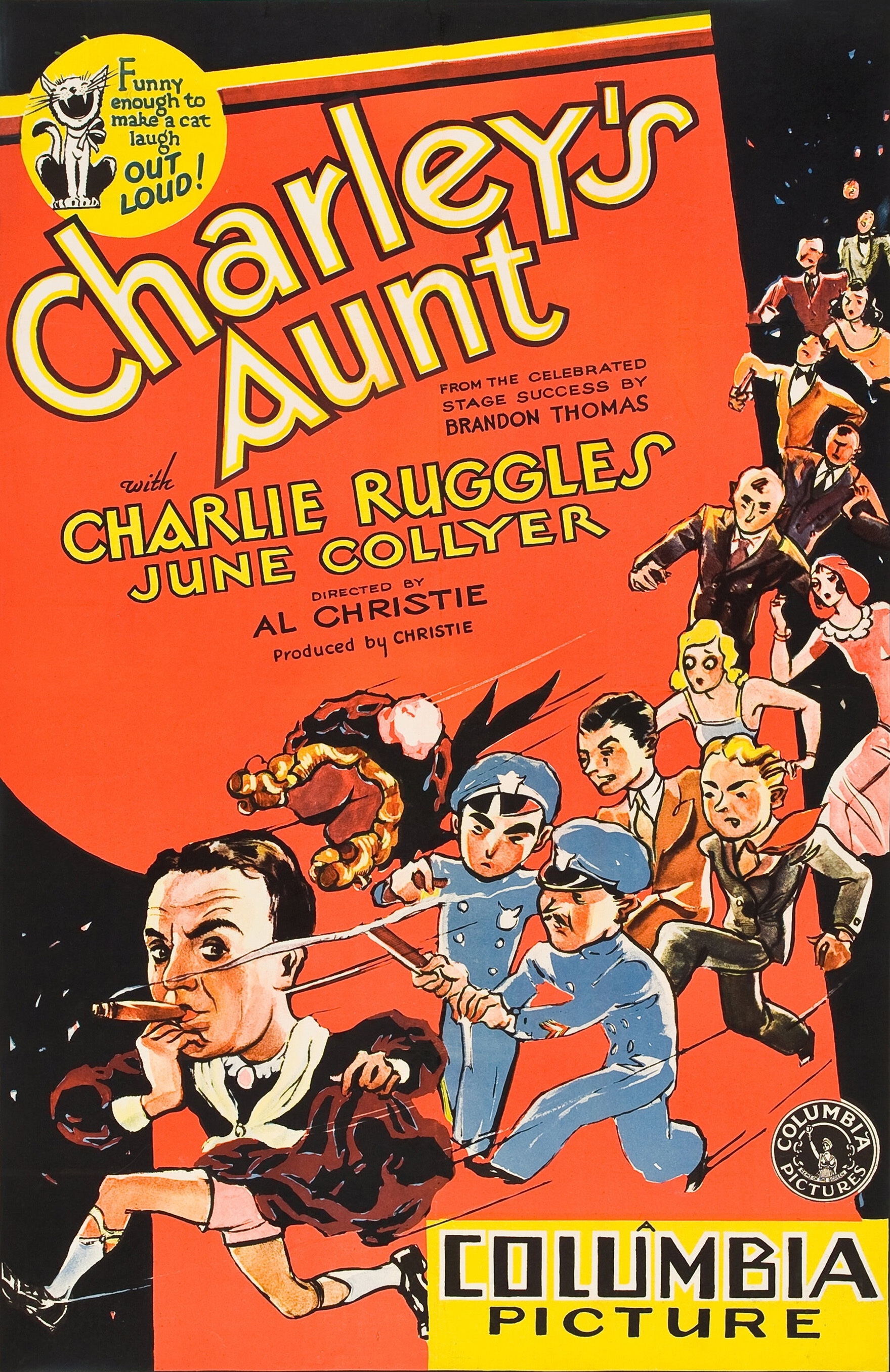
- Theatrical release poster
- Directed by: Al Christie
- Written by: F. McGrew Willis
- Based on: Charley's Aunt by Brandon Thomas
- Produced by: Al Christie; Charles Christie
- Starring: Charles Ruggles; June Collyer
- Cinematography: Gus Peterson; Harry Zech; Leslie Rowson
- Edited by: Sidney J. Walsh
- Music by: Claude Lapham
- Distributed by: Columbia Pictures
- Release date: December 25, 1930
- Running time: 88 minutes, 9 reels (7,890 feet)
- Country: United States
- Language: English

Charley's Aunt is a 1930 American pre-Code comedy film directed by Al Christie and starring Charles Ruggles, June Collyer, and Hugh Williams. It was an adaptation of the 1892 play Charley's Aunt by Brandon Thomas. It marked the film debut of Williams, who then returned to Britain and became a major star.

== Plot ==
Charley Wyckham and Jack Chesney pressure fellow student Fancourt Babberly (Babbs) to pose as Charley's Brazilian Aunt Donna Lucia. Their purpose is to have a chaperone for their amorous visits with Amy and Kitty, niece and ward of crusty Stephen Spettigue. Complications begin when Babbs, in drag, becomes the love object of old Spettigue and Sir Francis Chesney.

== Cast ==
- Charles Ruggles as Lord Fancourt Babberley
- June Collyer as Amy Spettigue
- Hugh Williams as Charlie Wykeham
- Doris Lloyd as Donna Lucia D' Alvadorez
- Halliwell Hobbes as Stephen Spettigue
- Flora le Breton as Ela Delahay
- Rodney McLennan as Jack Chesney
- Phillips Smalley as Sir Francis Chesney
- Flora Sheffield as Kitty Verdun
- Wilson Benge as Brassett
- Robert Bolder as Scotty
- Edgar Norton as Spettigue's Lawyer

== Bibliography ==
- Sweet, Matthew. Shepperton Babylon: The Lost Worlds of British Cinema. Faber and Faber, 2005.
