= Brandon Thomas (playwright) =

English actor, playwright and songwriter (1848–1914)

Brandon Thomas in 1901

Walter Brandon Thomas (24 December 1848 – 19 June 1914) was an English actor, playwright and songwriter, best known as the author of the farce Charley's Aunt.

Born in Liverpool to a family with no theatrical connections, Thomas worked in commerce, and as an occasional journalist, before achieving his ambition of becoming an actor. After a succession of minor roles, he became increasingly sought after as a character actor. He wrote more than a dozen plays, the most celebrated of which, Charley's Aunt, broke all historical records for plays of any kind with an original London run of 1,466 performances, opening in 1892. It has had numerous subsequent productions all around the world, including many film and musical theatre adaptations.

Although Thomas never repeated the prodigious success of Charley's Aunt, he maintained a career as an actor and dramatist until his death, acting mostly in comedy, but with occasional serious roles in the plays of Shakespeare and others.

== Biography ==
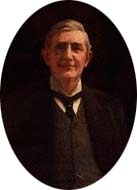
Painting of Thomas

=== Early years ===
Thomas was born in Mount Pleasant, Liverpool, the eldest of the three children of Walter Thomas (d. 1878), a bootseller, and his wife, Hannah, née Morris. He was educated at the Liverpool Institute and later at a private school in Prescot, Lancashire. At the age of 14, he enlisted in the Royal Marines but was bought out after six weeks and apprenticed to a shipbuilder. He learned bookkeeping and became a clerk with local Liverpool timber merchants, until 1875, when he took a similar post in Hull, where his family was by then living.

Thomas augmented his salary with occasional journalism; The Times noted that at 17 he published "a striking pamphlet" attacking the hymn-writers Moody and Sankey. His chief love, however, was the theatre. He appeared as an amateur in Hull, singing and reciting at temperance concerts, and performing in music halls and drawing room entertainments, playing the piano and singing his own songs. Through the influence of a local businessman, Albert Rollit, he secured an engagement with William and Madge Kendal at the Court Theatre in London. He made his first professional stage appearance there at age 30, in April 1879, as Sandy in The Queen's Shilling.

=== Early stage career ===
Thomas the playwright depicted at work

In addition to playing small parts, Thomas continued to write, and the Kendals accepted his play Comrades for production after it was revised by B. C. Stephenson. This "new and critical comedy" opened at the Court in 1882, with a cast including Arthur Cecil, D. G. Boucicault and Marion Terry. When the Kendals moved from the Court Theatre in Chelsea to the St. James's Theatre in the West End, Thomas went with them and remained in their company playing small roles until 1885, when he joined Rosina Vokes's company as its leading man on an American tour that lasted into the middle of 1886. On his return to London, he continued to write, producing several plays in the mid to late 1880s, and to appear in supporting roles. He first attracted significant attention in Sweet Lavender by Arthur Wing Pinero. In the role of the banker Geoffrey Wedderburn, "he at once leapt into favour as a strong and virile representative of elderly men".

In 1888, two days before his fortieth birthday, Thomas married Marguerite Blanche Leverson (1865–1930), daughter of James Leverson, a diamond merchant, and his wife, Henrietta. The marriage had been long delayed because of objections on religious grounds by the Leverson family. Thomas and his wife had three children, Amy Brandon Thomas, Jevan Roderick Brandon Thomas (1898–1977), who each had theatrical careers, and Sylvia M. Brandon Thomas (born c. 1905), who did not. (Note: The novelist Ada Leverson (Oscar Wilde's beloved "Sphinx") married into Marguerite's family in 1881. Marguerite's nephew was the D'Oyly Carte star Darrell Fancourt (né Darrell Louis Fancourt Leverson). It is not known whether the name of Thomas's most famous character, Lord Fancourt Babberley, was inspired by the name of this nephew, born six years before Charley's Aunt premiered.)

As a character actor, Thomas had the great advantage of a facility for regional accents. Of one performance, the critic W. A. Lewis Bettany wrote: "The dialect was of course perfect; is not our actor the one acknowledged master of dialect on the stage?" He was well received in two Scottish roles in this part of his career, Tammy Tamson in his own play A Highland Legacy (1888), and Macphail of Bullocheevin in Pinero's The Cabinet Minister (1890). As the latter, "with practically nothing to say he made the uncouth young Highlander, tied to his mother's apron strings, stand out as one of the most diverting features of the piece." In 1891, Thomas had a conspicuous artistic and financial success in a triple bill at Terry's Theatre. At the instigation of George Edwardes, he invested £1,000 in a production of three one-act plays: his own The Lancashire Sailor, Weedon Grossmith's A Commission, and Cecil Clay's A Pantomime Rehearsal. He took prominent roles in all three, displaying his versatility as "a romantic young lover, a delightfully cynical model and as the heavy, stupid Captain." The production ran for 152 performances, transferring to the Shaftesbury Theatre and making a good profit.

=== Charley's Aunt and later years ===
Thomas (l) as John of Gaunt, with Herbert Beerbohm Tree as Richard II

Thomas's outstanding hit was the farce Charley's Aunt. It was written for his friend, the actor W. S. Penley. Later the two disagreed (and went to court) about how much, if any, of the plot was Penley's invention rather than Thomas's. Penley told a journalist in 1894, "The play was my idea and Brandon Thomas wrote it. Later on, we went down into the country and worked at it. Then we worked it out on the stage." Penley produced the play and took the star role of Lord Fancourt Babberley, an undergraduate whose friends Jack and Charley persuade him to impersonate the latter's aunt. The early performances of the play were given on tour in the English provinces, beginning at Bury St Edmunds on 29 February 1892. The Royalty Theatre in London became unexpectedly vacant, and Penley took it, opening Charley's Aunt there on 21 December 1892. For the first few weeks in London, Thomas played the role of Sir Francis Chesney, the benevolent father of one of the undergraduates; he regularly played the part in later revivals until shortly before his death. The play was an immediate success and transferred to the larger Globe Theatre on 30 January 1893. It ran for a record-breaking 1,466 performances across four years, closing on 19 December 1896. It was simultaneously toured by seven companies in the United Kingdom.

The piece was successfully staged throughout the English-speaking world and, in translation, in many other countries. It had a major success on Broadway in 1893 and was revived there several times. In 1894, it was given both German and French premieres and was produced in Berlin every Christmas for many years. In 1895, The Theatre recorded that Charley's Aunt had been taken up in country after country. "From Germany it made its way to Russia, Holland, Denmark and Norway, and was heartily welcomed everywhere." Thereafter, it was frequently revived for decades and successfully adapted for films and musicals.

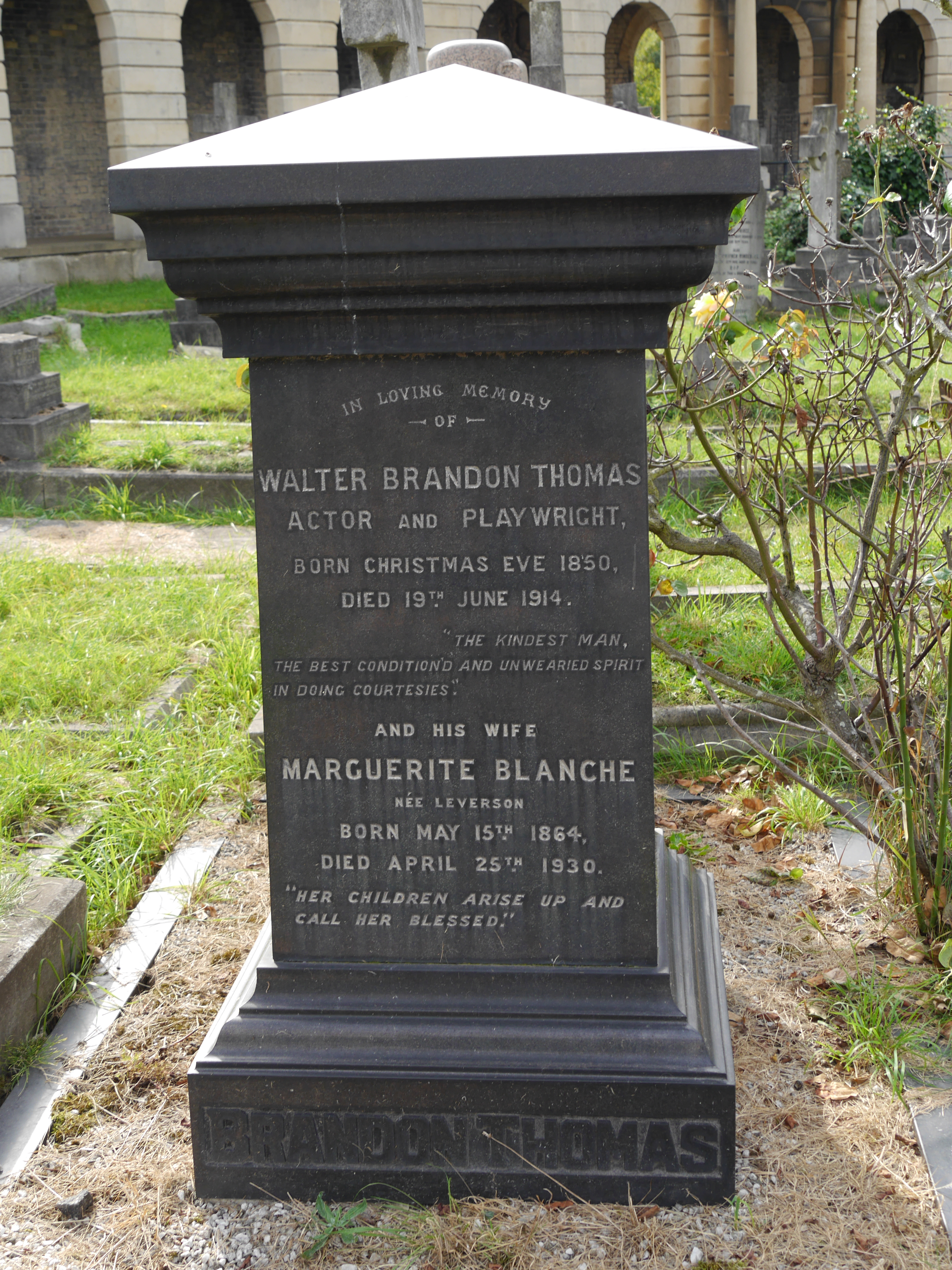
Thomas's gravestone, Brompton Cemetery

Thomas's career as a character actor continued to prosper. In 1892, he played in W. S. Gilbert's Rosencrantz and Guildenstern, a parody of Hamlet, and Faithful James, by B. C. Stephenson, with Ellaline Terriss, both at the Court Theatre. In 1895, he starred in a revival of The Rivals in another dialect role, Sir Lucius O'Trigger. Bernard Shaw wrote that Thomas succeeded in the part, "mainly by not doing what is expected of him". Other parts in which Thomas attracted praise were the Pope in Hall Caine's The Eternal City (1902) and John of Gaunt in Richard II to the King Richard of Herbert Beerbohm Tree (1903).

Thomas continued to write plays, but he never matched the success of Charley's Aunt. His later titles included Marriage, 1892; The Queen of Brilliants, adapted from the German with music by Edward Jakobowski, 1894; The Swordsman's Daughter (an adaptation of a French play, with Clement Scott), 1895; 22a Curzon Street, 1898; Women Are So Serious, 1901; Fourchette & Co., 1904; and A Judge’s Memory, 1906. He was also well known as an author and singer of "coon songs".

Thomas died at his home in Bloomsbury, London, in 1914, aged 65, after a brief illness. He was buried in Brompton Cemetery. In its obituary notice, The Times quoted him as saying, "I hoped to go down to fame as a great actor. If I go at all it will be as the author of Charley's Aunt."

=== Plays ===
- The Lancashire Sailor (performed in 1891)
- Comrades (1882)
- The Colour Sergent (1885)
- The Lodgers (1887)
- A Highland Legacy (1888)
- The Gold Craze (1889)
- The Lancashire Sailor (1891)
- Charley's Aunt (1892)
- Marriage (1892)
- The Queen of Brilliants (1894)
- The Swordsman's Daughter (1895)
- 22a Curzon Street (1898)
- Women Are So Serious (1901)
- Fourchette & Co (1904)
- Judge's Memory (1906)

== Notes and references ==
Notes

== Sources ==
- Brandon-Thomas, Jevan (1955). Charley's Aunt's Father: A life of Brandon Thomas. London: D. Saunders.
- Millward, Jessie (1923). Myself and Others. London: Hutchinson & Co.
