= Jönssonligan =

Swedish film series

- First appearance: Varning för Jönssonligan (1981)

In-universe information
- Type: Criminal organization
- Location: Sweden

Jönssonligan, literally the Jönsson Gang, is a Swedish comedy film series, originally based on the Danish series of films about the Olsen-banden, but later with unique scripts.

The Jönsson gang consists of the leader and criminal genius Charles Ingvar "Sickan" Jönsson, hence the name, and his two companions "Dynamit-Harry" (an alcoholic demolitions expert) and Ragnar Vanheden (a small-timer from Stockholm). Eight films have been made in total, though in the last three films actor Gösta Ekman got tired of his character "Sickan", and was replaced by the following characters, in order; "Doctor Max Adrian Busé", "Herman Melvin" and "Sven-Ingvar 'Sivan' Jönsson". The first two films featured the character Rocky, a Swedish-speaking Finn as member of the gang. He was eventually replaced by "Dynamit-Harry" who first appeared in the second film. Jönssonligans arch-enemy is Jacob Morgan Rockefeller Wall-Enberg Jr. - somewhat of a cross between a business magnate and a ruthless mob boss - who in all the films have been played by Per Grundén. His name alludes to the real-life Swedish business magnates Anders Wall and the Wallenberg family. Wall-Enberg's henchman is Biffen. In every film except for Jönssonligan dyker upp igen and Jönssonligan på Mallorca he has been played by Weiron Holmberg. In Jönssonligan dyker upp igen he is played by Lars Dejert and in Jönssonligan på Mallorca he never appears.

The main series has also created a spin-off series called Lilla Jönssonligan (Little Jönsson gang), which portrays the main three characters of the series as kids. The only recurring actor in all the Lilla Jönssonligan films is Loa Falkman who plays Wall-Enberg Jr's father Oscar Wall-Enberg Sr.

A reboot named Jönssonligan – Den perfekta stöten with new actors in the roles was released on 16 January 2015. The film was the first since Jönssonligan & Dynamit-Harry to feature the line-up Sickan, Vanheden, Rocky and Dynamit-Harry and the first not to feature Wall-Enberg, instead featuring an antagonist named 'Wallentin'. The film was not commercially successful. A second reboot premiered in 2020.

== List of movies and main characters ==
=== Varning för Jönssonligan (Beware of the Jönsson Gang, 1981) ===
Actor	Role
Gösta Ekman	Charles-Ingvar "Sickan" Jönsson
Ulf Brunnberg	Ragnar Vanheden
Nils Brandt	Rocky
Siw Malmkvist	Eivor
Per Grundén	Wall-Enberg Jr.
Jan-Olof Strandberg	Svensson
Tomas Norström	Holm
Weiron Holmberg	Biffen
Johannes Brost	Robber
Peter Hüttner	Robber

=== Jönssonligan & Dynamit-Harry (The Jönsson Gang & Dynamite-Harry, 1982) ===
Actor	Role
Gösta Ekman	Charles-Ingvar "Sickan" Jönsson
Ulf Brunnberg	Ragnar Vanheden
Nils Brandt	Rocky
Björn Gustafson	Dynamit-Harry
Carl Billquist	Persson
Dan Ekborg	Gren
Sten Ardenstam	Appelgren
Mona Seilitz	Katrin Appelgren
Weiron Holmberg	Biffen
Jarl Borssén	Night guard
Lena Söderblom	Mrs. Lundberg
Per Grundén	Wall-Enberg
Peder Ivarsson	Bill
Peter Harryson	Polis
Jan Waldekranz	Polis
Gösta Krantz	Driver

=== Jönssonligan får guldfeber (The Jönsson Gang gets Gold Fever, 1984) ===
Actor	Role
Gösta Ekman	Charles-Ingvar "Sickan" Jönsson
Ulf Brunnberg	Ragnar Vanheden
Björn Gustafson	Harry "Dynamit-Harry" Kruth
Birgitta Andersson	Doris
Per Grundén	Director Wall-Enberg
Carl Billquist	Persson
Weiron Holmberg	Biffen
Sten Ljunggren	Fritz Müllweiser
Jan Waldekranz	Gren
Peter Harryson	Driver
Fredrik Ohlsson	Minister
Birger Malmsten	ÖB

=== Jönssonligan dyker upp igen (The Jönsson Gang Resurface, 1986) ===
Actor	Role
Gösta Ekman	Charles-Ingvar "Sickan" Jönsson
Ulf Brunnberg	Ragnar Vanheden
Björn Gustafson	Dynamit-Harry
Birgitta Andersson	Doris
Per Grundén	Morgan Wall-Enberg
Johannes Brost	"Järnarmen" ("The Iron-Arm")
Lars Dejert	"Biffen" ("The Beef")
Kent Andersson	Insp. Persson
Dan Ekborg	Police assistant
John Harryson	Russian submarine captain

=== Jönssonligan på Mallorca (The Jönsson Gang in Mallorca, 1989) ===
Actor	Role
Gösta Ekman	Charles-Ingvar 'Sickan' Jönsson
Björn Gustafson	Dynamit-Harry
Ulf Brunnberg	Ragnar Vanheden
Birgitta Andersson	Doris
Per Grundén	Morgan Wall-Enberg
Margaretha Krook	Gertrude Germann
Dan Ekborg	Gren
Kent Andersson	Persson
Johann Neumann	Ödlan
Roland Janson	Brother

=== Jönssonligan & den svarta diamanten (The Jönsson Gang & the Black Diamond, 1992) ===
Actor	Role
Peter Haber	Dr. Max Adrian Busé (M.A. Busé)
Ulf Brunnberg	Ragnar Vanheden
Björn Gustafson	Dynamit-Harry
Birgitta Andersson	Doris
Björn Granath	Nils Loman
Pontus Gustafsson	Konrad Andersson
Bernt Lindkvist	Egon Holmberg
Per Grundén	Wall-Enberg
Weiron Holmberg	Biffen
Lena T. Hansson	Mimmi
Elias Ringqvist	Lillis
Rikard Wolff	Count Romanoff
Ulf Eriksson	Patient
Jan Mybrand	Doctor
Ulf Friberg	Student
Suzanne Ernrup	Witness

=== Jönssonligans största kupp (The Jönsson Gang's Greatest Robbery, 1994) ===
Actor	Role
Stellan Skarsgård	Herman Melvin
Ulf Brunnberg	Vanheden
Björn Gustafson	Dynamit-Harry
Peter Haber	Doktor Busé
Birgitta Andersson	Doris
Per Grundén	Wall- Enberg
Weiron Holmberg	Johansson "Biffen"
Bernt Lindkvist	Egon Holmberg
Carl Magnus Dellow	Anton Beckman
Pontus Gustafsson	Konrad Andersson
Gösta Bredefeldt	Josef Burak
Elias Ringquist	Lillis
Lars-Göran Persson	Maffialeader
Maciej Koslowski	Ritzie
Jan Mybrand	Safety guard
Michael Segerström	Safety boss
Yvonne Schaloske	Hotel cleaner

=== Jönssonligan spelar högt (The Jönsson Gang at High Stakes, 2000) ===
Actor	Role
Johan Ulveson	Sven-Ingvar "Sivan" Jönsson
Ulf Brunnberg	Ragnar Vanheden
Björn Gustafson	Dynamit-Harry
Birgitta Andersson	Doris
Margreth Weivers	Grandma Jönsson
Per Grundén	Wall-Enberg
Weiron Holmberg	Biffen
Helge Skoog	Operachief Waldemar Gustafsson
Johan Rabaeus	Signore
Ola Forssmed	Roberto
Dan Ekborg	Bajron
Henrietta Indahl	Soprano
Björn Hallman	Maestro
Rolf Skoglund	Gregor
Bert Gradin	Police

== Reboot (I) ==
=== Den perfekta stöten (The Master Plan, 2015) ===
Actor	Role
Simon J. Berger	Charles-Ingvar Jönsson
Edvin Ryding	Younger Charles-Ingvar
Alexander Karim	Ragnar Vanheden
Torkel Petersson	Dynamit-Harry
Susanne Thorson	Rocky
Andrea Edwards	Wallentin
Jens Hultén	Krantz
Niklas Falk	Ralf
Irma Hjort Erixson	Anja
Juan Rodríguez	Alejandro
Anki Larsson	School counselor
Alexandra Alegren	Wallentin's secretary
Ramtin Parvaneh	Keeper

== Reboot (II) ==
=== Se upp för Jönssonligan (Watch Out for the Jönsson Gang, 2020) ===
Actor	Role
Henrik Dorsin	Charles-Ingvar Jönsson
Anders "Ankan" Johansson	Ragnar Vanheden
David Sundin	Dynamit Harry
Hedda Stiernstedt	Doris
Reine Brynolfsson	Televinken
Marie Göranzon	Margit Vanheden
Lennart Hjulström	Gösta Vanheden
Lena Olin	Anita
Sven Ahlström	Poppe
Henric Holmberg	Knut Enberg
MyAnna Buring	Regina Wall
Ville Virtanen	Kantor Veikko Kusela
Pekka Strang	Henrik Adlerstierna

== Reboot (III) ==
=== Jönssonligan kommer tillbaka (The Jönsson Gang Returns, 2024) ===
Actor	Role
Robert Gustafsson	Charles-Ingvar Jönsson
Jonas Karlsson	Ragnar Vanheden
Anders Jansson	Dynamit-Harry
Jennie Silfverhjelm	Doris
Johan Rabaeus	Wall-Enberg
Thomas Bo Larsen	Dr. Dino Drejer
Lotta Tejle	Rigmor Gren
David Batra	Peter
Felicia Danielsson	Nea
Arvid Kananian	Viktor
Alfred Svensson	Milton

== Lilla Jönssonligan (Young Jönsson Gang) ==
- Lilla Jönssonligan och cornflakeskuppen (Young Jönsson Gang & the Cornflakes Robbery) (1996)
- Lilla Jönssonligan på styva linan (Young Jönsson Gang Showing Off) (1997)
- Lilla Jönssonligan på kollo (Young Jönsson Gang at Summer Camp) (2004)
- Lilla Jönssonligan och stjärnkuppen (Young Jönsson Gang & the Star Robbery) (2006)

== In other media ==
Jönssonligan has also featured in two adventure computer games and in comics, both incarnations incited by the Swedish cartoonist Per Demervall.

Games

- Jönssonligan: Jakten på Mjölner, 1999
- Jönssonligan går på djupet, 2000

Comics

- Jönssonligan – Tajmat och klart, 1993
- Jönssonligan – På fri fot, 1998

== See also ==
- Olsen Gang
