= Stall-Erik och snapphanarna =

- Directed by: Anders Olofsson
- Written by: Anders Olofsson
- Produced by: Anders Olofsson
- Cinematography: Rolf Hamark
- Country: Sweden
- Language: Swedish

Stall-Erik och snapphanarna is a Swedish film project directed by and starring Anders Olofsson. The narrative is set between 1658 and the early 18th century and tells the story of the snapphanar, a pro-Danish guerrilla movement that fought against Sweden in the 17th century. Olofsson, an amateur filmmaker who works as a cleaner by day, began to shoot the film in 1996. His ability to recruit many established actors, as well as the long production process, has received publicity in several regional and national newspapers. The film was set to be finished in 2020. However, in early 2020, Olofsson set a goal to involve 100 celebrities in the film, and thus revised his estimated completion time to 2025.

== Cast ==
- Anders Olofsson - Stall-Erik
- Sven-Bertil Taube - Casparus Due
- Göran Stangertz - Göingehövding
- Marie Göranzon - soldatänka
- Kjell Bergqvist - Trued
- Inger Nilsson - Lisbeth Larsson
- Hans Lindgren - vargjägare Rasmus Bock
- Roger Pontare - Pridbjörn
- Lars Flinckman - Holger Thott, adelsman
- Lasse Kronér - Uggle-Erik
- Sten Ljunggren - överbefälhavare
- Ingvar Andersson - skogsluffare
- Björn Gustafson - bonde
- Stig Grybe - bonde
- Pierre Lindstedt - bonde
- Tomas von Brömssen - bonde
- Evert Lindkvist - luffare
- Ingvar Hirdwall - skräddare Måns
- Sven-Åke Gustavsson - Simon Böse
- Göran Engman - Lillemats
- Stefan Sauk - lösdrivare Jon
- Gustav Levin - Rutger von Aschenberg
- Fillie Lyckow - Silla, bondkvinna
- Olle Björling - bonde
- Inga Ålenius - bondkvinna
- Inga Landgré - bondkvinna
- Lena Söderblom - bondkvinna
- Lotta Engberg - bondkvinna
- Fredrik Ohlsson - bonde
- Siw Malmkvist - bondkvinna
- Cecilia Ljung - bondkvinna
- Karin Ekström - häxa
- Bo G. Andersson - Truls Andersson
- Ulrica Bengtsson - bondkvinna
- Rickard Olsson - snapphane
- Jan-Ove Jönsson - lösdrivare
- Siw Carlsson - bondkvinna
- Kim Lantz - stråtrövare
- Babben Larsson - fru Runius
- Janne "Loffe" Carlsson - råttfångare
- Jan Malmsjö - vandrare
- Magnus Härenstam
- Marika Lagercrantz
- Lena Endre
- Samuel Fröler
- Allan Svensson
- Niels Dybeck
- Kent Andersson
- Lasse Brandeby
- Peter Harryson
- Suzanne Reuter
- Bengt Bauler
- Johannes Brost
- Bert-Åke Varg
- Sven Wollter
- Peter Haber
- Rolf Skoglund
- Petra Mede
- Bertil Norström
- Margreth Weivers
- Olof Thunberg
- Anders Nyström
- Björn Granath
- Lars Lind
- Anita Wall
- Emy Storm
- Gun Jönsson
- Göte Fyhring
- Anders Linder
- Kristina Törnqvist
- Eva Rydberg
- Willie Andréason
- Roland Hedlund
- Claes Malmberg
- Hans Wigren
- Ulf Brunnberg
- Ing-Marie Carlsson
- Johan Rabaeus
- Per Myrberg
- Carina Lidbom
- Lena B. Nilsson
- Carl Kjellgren
- Christer Söderlund
- Thomas Roos
- Rolf Lassgård
- Stig Torstensson
- Roland Janson
- Ulf Dohlsten
- Christina Stenius
- Ewa Roos
- Stina Ekblad
- Marie Richardson
- Julia Dufvenius
- Alexandra Rapaport
- Sissela Benn
- Göran Forsmark
- Anna-Lotta Larsson
- Michaela Jolin
- Sanna Persson
