= Lilla Jönssonligan på styva linan =

- Directed by: Christjan Wegner
- Written by: Christjan Wegner; Björn Carlström
- Produced by: Joakim Hansson; Björn Carlström
- Starring: Kalle Eriksson; Jonathan Flumee; Fredrik Glimskär
- Music by: Christer Sandelin; Ragnar Grippe (theme)
- Distributed by: Sonet Film AB
- Release date: 28 November 1997
- Running time: 103 minutes
- Country: Sweden
- Language: Swedish
- Budget: 17,000,000 SEK (2,819,237 USD)
- Box office: 13,372,504 SEK (2,217,662 USD)

Lilla Jönssonligan på styva linan is the second film in the Swedish Lilla Jönssonligan film series. It was released on November 28, 1997, in Sweden and was directed by Christjan Wegner.

The film has been shown several times on the Swedish television channels SVT1, TV3 and TV4. It was released in Germany on September 14, 2000, as Die Jönnson Bande: Charles Ingvars neuer Plan.

== Plot ==
It's in the middle of the summer. Sickan, Ragnar and Dynamit-Harry, or the Jönsson Liga as they call themselves, has nothing to do until the circus comes to town. Sickan quickly thinks out a plan on how they're going to get tickets. However, after they've got their hands on the tickets, the three friends arch enemy, Junior Wall-Enberg, son of the city's mayor Vigor Wall-Enberg, steals the tickets.

The Jönsson Liga goes to Junior's house during night to get the tickets back, but they're not the only ones sneaking around the mayor's house. Three members of the circus, the human cannonball, the sword swallower, and the clown, are actually criminals and are at the house to steal the families paintings. The police arrives to the house after an alarm is triggered, and they find The Jönsson Liga hiding, while the circus members escape with the paintings. The Jönsson Liga becomes the main suspect of the stolen paintings, so they dress up as girls and go to the circus to get the paintings back.

== Cast ==
- Kalle Eriksson - Charles-Ingvar "Sickan" Jönsson
- Jonathan Flumée - Ragnar Vanheden
- Fredrik Glimskär - Dynamit-Harry
- Jonna Sohlmér - Doris
- Robert Gustafsson - Cannonball
- Johan Rabaeus - Clown
- Ulla Skoog - Sword swallower
- Niklas Falk - Sigvard Jönsson
- Cecilia Nilsson - Tora Jönsson
- Isak Ekblom - Sven-Ingvar Jönsson
- Loa Falkman - Oscar Wall-Enberg
- Lena T. Hansson - Lilian Wall-Enberg
- Micke Dubois - Loket
- Peter Harryson - Amusement park director
