= Jönssonligan och Dynamit-Harry =

Jönssonligan & Dynamit-Harry
- English: The Johnson Gang & Dynamite-Harry
- Directed by: Mikael Ekman
- Written by: Henning Bahs, Erik Balling, William Aldridge, Sven Melander
- Based on: Olsen Gang by Erik Balling; Henning Bahs
- Produced by: Ingemar Ejve
- Starring: Gösta Ekman, Ulf Brunnberg, Nils Brandt, Björn Gustafson
- Music by: Ragnar Grippe
- Distributed by: Svensk Filmindustri
- Release date: 17 September 1982
- Running time: 102 min
- Country: Sweden
- Language: Swedish

Jönssonligan och Dynamit-Harry (International English title The Johnson Gang & Dynamite-Harry) is a 1982 Swedish film about the gang Jönssonligan, based on the Danish film The Olsen Gang Goes Crazy.

This is the second film in the series, and the first to feature Dynamit-Harry, who would replace Rocky in all the following films in the series.

== Cast ==
Actor	Role
Gösta Ekman	Charles-Ingvar "Sickan" Jönsson
Ulf Brunnberg	Ragnar Vanheden
Nils Brandt	Rocky
Björn Gustafson	Dynamit-Harry
Carl Billquist	Persson
Dan Ekborg	Gren
Sten Ardenstam	Appelgren
Mona Seilitz	Katrin Appelgren
Weiron Holmberg	Biffen
Jarl Borssén	Night guard
Lena Söderblom	Mrs. Lundberg
Per Grundén	Wall-Enberg
Peder Ivarsson	Bill
Peter Harryson	Polis
Jan Waldekranz	Polis
Gösta Krantz	Driver
