= Göta kanal eller Vem drog ur proppen? =

1981 film

- Swedish DVD-cover
- Directed by: Hans Iveberg
- Written by: Hans Iveberg
- Produced by: Göran Lindström
- Starring: Janne Carlsson; Kim Anderzon
- Cinematography: Petter Davidson
- Edited by: Roger Sellberg
- Music by: Björn Isfält
- Release date: 18 December 1981 (Sweden)
- Running time: 99 minutes
- Country: Sweden
- Language: Swedish
- Box office: SEK 27,609,579

Göta kanal eller Vem drog ur proppen? (English: Göta Canal or Who Pulled the Plug?) is a Swedish comedy film which was released to cinemas in Sweden on 18 December 1981 directed by Hans Iveberg and starring Janne 'Loffe' Carlsson and Kim Anderzon.

== Plot ==
A rich Arab wants to place a huge order of 1000 motorboats. The multinational Uniship and the smaller company Anderssons båtvarv compete for the contract. When the buyer can't reach a decision he wants the boats to compete in a race from Stockholm, through Göta kanal, to Gothenburg. The winner of the race will win the contract. The competitors are ready to win at all cost.

== Cast (selection) ==
=== Carina crew ===
- Janne 'Loffe' Carlsson - Janne Andersson
- Kim Anderzon - Lena Andersson
- Stig Ossian Ericson - Sigurd

=== Uniship crew ===
- Yvonne Lombard - Rut
- Nils Eklund - Rune
- Stig Engström - Björn H:son Larsson

=== Others ===
- Magnus Härenstam - Peter Black, kronofogde
- Rolv Wesenlund - Ole
- Per Oscarsson - Exportföreningens representative
- Georg Rydeberg - Gustav, slussvakt
- Peter Harryson - Police
- Svante Grundberg - Man with canoe
- Nadim Sawalha - Sheikh Kahlifa bin Hirscham al Saba
- Lars Amble - Leif Andersson
- Marie Göranzon - Astrid Ohlson
- Frank Andersson - Man in boat
- Kent Andersson - Göteborgare
- Weiron Holmberg - Göteborgare
- Gösta Engström - Husvagnskille
- Sune Mangs - Serviceman
- Bertil Norström - Slussvakt
- Anders Nyström - Tage, fisherman
- Bosse Parnevik - Carl XVI Gustaf
- Christer Lindarw - Queen Silvia
- Anna-Lotta Larsson - Fortune teller
- Ulf Brunnberg - Båtpolis
- Michael Segerström - Slussvakt
- Mona Seilitz - Sivan
- Johan Thorén - stuntman
- Jannis Pesketzis - Grek

== Production ==
Filming took place between 13 July - 30 September 1981.

The two boats in the film are Orrskär 1000 (Carina) and Storebro's Storö 31 Baltic (Uniship).

A documentary, Hur dom drog ur proppen, was made about, by Swedish means, advanced stunts.

== Reception ==
It's hard and an unnecessary waste of space to grade this misery. Hardest, perhaps, is to watch prominent actors make cameos as imbecile canal guardians without succeeding transforming the idiocy to humour.

— Hanserik Hjertén in Dagens Nyheter 19 December 1981

The film was a huge success in Sweden and was seen by over 1.5 million people. Two sequels were made, in 2006 and 2009.

The audience criticized the film for the sound. The film's screenwriter and director Hans Iveberg answered in Expressen by blaming the tradition in Swedish film making where sound almost resembles that of radio theatre.

In 1983 an article in Eskilstuna-Kuriren reported about a conference where the use of product placement in the film was an issue. There was discussions on whether the film should be taxed for this. Iveberg denied being sponsored but Urban Jäfvert and Per Håkansson at Stockholm University had confirmed that products were exposed in the film in exchange for the crew using them.
