= Lilla Jönssonligan och cornflakeskuppen =

- Directed by: Christjan Wegner
- Written by: Mikael Hylin; Christjan Wegner
- Produced by: Mikael Hylin; Maria Nordenberg
- Starring: Kalle Eriksson; Jonathan Flumee; Fredrik Glimskär
- Music by: Michael B. Tretow
- Distributed by: Sonet Film AB
- Release date: 29 November 1996
- Running time: 83 minutes
- Country: Sweden
- Language: Swedish

Lilla Jönssonligan och cornflakeskuppen (English: The Little Jönsson Gang and the cornflakes heist) is a Swedish film, the first out of four films in the Lilla Jönssonligan film series. It was released on 29 November 1996 in Sweden and was directed by Christjan Wegner.

The film has been shown several times on the Swedish television channels SVT1, TV3 and TV4. It was released in Germany on 7 September 2000, as Die Jönnson Bande & der Cornflakes-Raub.

== Synopsis ==
Charles-Ingvar "Sickan" Jönsson is a new student in Dynamit-Harry's and Ragnars's school. He instantly gets bullied by Junior and Biffen for his nerdy looks. The year is 1953 and 'filmisar', small collectible cards with portraits of film stars and celebrities, found in Kellogg's Corn Flakes' boxes, are popular at the school. Sickan's first heist will be to get as many 'filmisar' as he can by sneaking in to the corn flakes factory with his newly made friends Harry and Ragnar.

== Cast ==
- Kalle Eriksson - Charles-Ingvar "Sickan" Jönsson
- Jonathan Flumée - Ragnar Vanheden
- Fredrik Glimskär - Dynamit-Harry
- Jonna Sohlmér - Doris
- Anders Öström - Junior Wall-Enberg
- Mats Wennberg - Biffen
- Peter Rangmar - Sigvard Jönsson
- Cecilia Nilsson - Tora Jönsson
- Isak Ekblom - Sven-Ingvar Jönsson
- Loa Falkman - Oscar Wall-Enberg
- Lena T. Hansson - Lilian Wall-Enberg
- Micke Dubois - Loket
- Jerry Williams - Einar Vanheden
- Mona Seilitz - Rut Vanheden
- Cecilia Häll - Vivi Vanheden
- Olof Thunberg - Morfar Elis
