= The Jönsson Gang's Greatest Robbery =

1995 film

- Directed by: Hans Åke Gabrielsson
- Written by: Stig Boqvist, Hans Åke Gabrielsson
- Based on: Olsen Gang by Erik Balling; Henning Bahs
- Starring: Ulf Brunnberg, Björn Gustafson, Stellan Skarsgård, Peter Haber, Birgitta Andersson
- Release date: 3 February 1995 (Sweden)
- Running time: 99 minutes
- Country: Sweden
- Language: Swedish

The Jönsson Gang's Greatest Robbery (Swedish: Jönssonligan största kupp) is a Swedish film about the gang Jönssonligan, screened in theaters in Sweden on 3 February 1995.

== Cast ==
Actor	Role
Stellan Skarsgård	Herman Melvin
Ulf Brunnberg	Vanheden
Björn Gustafson	Dynamit-Harry
Peter Haber	Doktor Busé
Birgitta Andersson	Doris
Per Grundén	Wall- Enberg
Weiron Holmberg	Johansson "Biffen"
Bernt Lindkvist	Egon Holmberg
Carl Magnus Dellow	Anton Beckman
Pontus Gustafsson	Konrad Andersson
Gösta Bredefeldt	Josef Burak
Elias Ringquist	Lillis
Lars-Göran Persson	Maffialeader
Maciej Koslowski	Ritzie
Jan Mybrand	Safety guard
Michael Segerström	Safety boss
Yvonne Schaloske	Hotel cleaner
