= The Dog Hotel =

The Dog Hotel Hundhotellet
- Directed by: Per Åhlin
- Written by: Screenplay: Per Åhlin; Hans Åke Gabrielsson
- Produced by: Lars Jönsson
- Starring: Hans Alfredson; Margreth Weivers; Jan Mybrand; Rolf Skoglund; Tomas von Brömssen
- Edited by: Olle Tannergård
- Music by: Magnus Jarlbo
- Production company: Zentropa Entertainments
- Distributed by: Sandrew Metronome
- Release date: 2000
- Running time: 68 minutes
- Countries: Sweden; Norway; Denmark
- Language: Swedish

Hundhotellet – En mystisk historia is a Swedish animated detective mystery/surreal film from 2000, directed by Per Åhlin who also wrote the script together with Hans Åke Gabrielsson. The film is traditionally animated by hand, the last film in Sweden to have been produced in that style.

== Plot ==
An anthropomorphic dog named Sture is talked into taking a trip to Paris by his friend Picasso. After a series of misfortunes they end up in Scotland instead, staying at a mysterious hotel. Picasso remains ignorant and believes they are in Paris. Sture befriends the novelist Miss Mops and gets to meet several mysterious characters living in the hotel as strange events revolving around an Egyptian artifact start to take place.

== Voice cast ==
- Hans Alfredson as Sture
- Margreth Weivers as Miss Mops
- Jan Mybrand as Picasso the dachshund
- Stig Grybe as Dr. Dunkelspiel, the villain
- Tomas von Brömssen as the Hotel Owner
- Björn Kjellman as Ke Ping, the wizard
- Rolf Skoglund as Baskerville Jr.
- Johan Rabaeus as Mr Big, the American
- Johan Ulveson as Waiter 1
- Bo Christer Hjelte as Waiter 2
- Peter Harryson as Jägmästarn, a hunter
- Pernilla Wahlgren as the Hitchhicker
- Karin Gidfors as the Kitchen Girl / Cleaner

== Response ==
The film received a very positive response from critics.
