= Jönssonligan dyker upp igen =

Jönssonligan Dyker Upp Igen
- Directed by: Mikael Ekman
- Written by: Rolf Börjlind, Gösta Ekman, Mikael Ekman
- Based on: Olsen Gang by Erik Balling; Henning Bahs
- Produced by: Waldemar Bergendahl, Ingemar Ejve
- Starring: Gösta Ekman, Ulf Brunnberg, Björn Gustafson
- Music by: Ragnar Grippe
- Distributed by: Svensk Filmindustri, Nordisk Film
- Release date: 24 October 1986
- Running time: 88 min
- Countries: Sweden, Denmark
- Language: Swedish

Jönssonligan dyker upp igen ('The Johnson Gang Resurface' or 'The Return of the Johnson Gang') is a 1986 Swedish comedy film, one of a series of films made about Jönssonligan, a gang of criminals.

This was the first Swedish film in the series with an original script, not based on an original Olsen-banden film.

== Cast ==
Actor	Role
Gösta Ekman	Charles-Ingvar "Sickan" Jönsson
Ulf Brunnberg	Ragnar Vanheden
Björn Gustafson	Dynamit-Harry Kruth
Birgitta Andersson	Doris
Per Grundén	Morgan Wall-Enberg
Johannes Brost	"Järnarmen" ("The Iron-Arm")
Lars Dejert	"Biffen" ("The Beef")
Kent Andersson	Insp. Persson
Dan Ekborg	Police assistant
John Harryson	Russian submarine captain
