= Jönssonligan på Mallorca =

- DVD-cover
- Directed by: Mikael Ekman
- Written by: Mikael Ekman; Rolf Börjlind; Gösta Ekman
- Based on: Olsen Gang by Erik Balling; Henning Bahs
- Produced by: Christer Abrahamsen
- Starring: Gösta Ekman; Ulf Brunnberg; Björn Gustafson
- Music by: Ragnar Grippe
- Distributed by: Cinema Art; Svensk Filmindustri
- Release date: 3 November 1989
- Running time: 101 minutes
- Country: Sweden
- Language: Swedish

Jönssonligan på Mallorca ('The Johnson Gang in Mallorca') is a Swedish film made in 1989, and is one of a series about a criminal gang called Jönssonligan.

This was the last film in the series where Gösta Ekman played the part of Sickan.

== Cast ==
Actor	Role
Gösta Ekman	Charles-Ingvar 'Sickan' Jönsson
Björn Gustafson	Dynamit-Harry
Ulf Brunnberg	Ragnar Vanheden
Birgitta Andersson	Doris
Per Grundén	Morgan Wall-Enberg
Margaretha Krook	Gertrude Germann
Dan Ekborg	Gren
Kent Andersson	Persson
Johann Neumann	Ödlan
Roland Janson	Brother
