= Jönssonligan får guldfeber =

Jönssonligan får Guldfeber
- Directed by: Mikael Ekman
- Written by: Henning Bahs; Erik Balling; Rolf Börjlind
- Based on: Olsen Gang by Erik Balling; Henning Bahs
- Produced by: Ingemar Ejve; Björn Henricson
- Starring: Gösta Ekman; Ulf Brunnberg; Björn Gustafson
- Music by: Ragnar Grippe
- Distributed by: Svenska AB Nordisk Tonefilm; Svensk Filmindustri; Papphammar Production
- Release date: 19 October 1984
- Running time: 101 min
- Countries: Sweden; Denmark
- Language: Swedish

Jönssonligan får guldfeber ('The Johnsson Gang gets Gold Fever') is a Swedish film about the gang Jönssonligan made in 1984.

The film includes a famous scene, where Jönssonligan's leader, Sickan Jönsson, is tied to the hands of a giant clock on the tower of the Stockholm City Hall. The clock doesn't exist in real life, but was created for the film. The reason for this is that the movie is a remake of the Danish film Olsen-bandens store kup, and the tower of Copenhagen City Hall does indeed have a clock.

== Cast ==
Actor	Role
Gösta Ekman	Charles-Ingvar "Sickan" Jönsson
Ulf Brunnberg	Ragnar Vanheden
Björn Gustafson	Harry "Dynamit-Harry" Kruth
Birgitta Andersson	Doris
Per Grundén	Director Wall-Enberg
Carl Billquist	Persson
Weiron Holmberg	Biffen
Sten Ljunggren	Fritz Müllweiser
Jan Waldekranz	Gren
Peter Harryson	Driver
Fredrik Ohlsson	Minister
Birger Malmsten	ÖB
