= Grunden =

Grunden may refer to the following:

== Persons with the name ==
- Per Grundén (1922–2011), Swedish singer and actor
- Toralf Grunden (fl. 1900s), Swedish Antarctic explorer, namesake of geologic features in Antarctica
- Walter E. Grunden, historiographer of the Japanese atomic program

== Places with the name ==
- any of several towns or villages in Germany
- Grunden Rock, a 15-metre-tall rock near the entrance to Hope Bay, in the Antarctic Peninsula (named for Toralf Grunden, who wintered there in 1902–03)

== Other uses ==
- the Danish word for brilliant
