= Jönssonligan spelar högt =

Jönssonligan Spelar Högt
- Directed by: Thomas Ryberger
- Written by: Björn Gustafson
- Based on: Olsen Gang by Erik Balling; Henning Bahs
- Produced by: Börje Hansson
- Starring: Ulf Brunnberg; Björn Gustafson; Johan Ulveson
- Music by: Björn Hallman
- Release date: 25 December 2000
- Running time: 92 min
- Country: Sweden
- Language: Swedish

Jönssonligan spelar högt ('The Johnson Gang at High Stakes') is a Swedish film about the gang Jönssonligan made in 2000.

== Plot ==
Dynamit-Harry and Vanheden have left the criminal life behind them. Together with Harry's wife they are managing a small company together AB Alltjänst (roughly General Servicing Ltd). But when Sickan's maternal grandmother suspects that Wall-Enberg is shutting down theaters like La Scala they contact Sickans brother Sven-Ingvar "Sivan" Jönsson who has a plan. They are going to steal a computer floppy disc with bank account numbers worth 60 billion kronor.

== Cast ==
Actor	Role
Johan Ulveson	Sven-Ingvar "Sivan" Jönsson
Ulf Brunnberg	Ragnar Vanheden
Björn Gustafson	Dynamit-Harry
Birgitta Andersson	Doris
Margreth Weivers	Grandma Jönsson
Per Grundén	Wall-Enberg
Weiron Holmberg	Biffen
Helge Skoog	Operachief Waldemar Gustafsson
Johan Rabaeus	Signore
Ola Forssmed	Roberto
Dan Ekborg	Bajron
Henrietta Indahl	Soprano
Björn Hallman	Maestro
Rolf Skoglund	Gregor
Bert Gradin	Police

== Reception ==
Aftonbladet rated the film 2/5, calling it "the worst part of the series so far".
