= Jönssonligan och den svarta diamanten =

Jönssonligan & Den Svarta Diamanten
- Directed by: Hans Åke Gabrielsson
- Written by: Hans Åke Gabrielsson; Rolf Börjlind
- Based on: Olsen Gang by Erik Balling; Henning Bahs
- Produced by: Ingemar Ejve; Katinka Faragó
- Starring: Ulf Brunnberg; Björn Gustafson; Peter Haber; Birgitta Andersson
- Music by: Thomas Lindahl
- Distributed by: Svensk Filmindustri
- Release date: 30 October 1992
- Running time: 104 min
- Country: Sweden
- Language: Swedish

Jönssonligan & den svarta diamanten ('The Johnson Gang & the Black Diamond') is a Swedish film about the gang Jönssonligan made in 1992. It's the first film not to feature the original gang leader Sickan played by Gösta Ekman. The famous theme of the previous films is also replaced by a new theme to mark the absence of Sickan. The original theme only plays briefly in a single scene.

The film is loosely inspired by the film The Testament of Dr. Mabuse.

== Plot ==
Ragnar Vanheden and Harry "Dynamit-Harry" Kruth find themselves hooked up with a confused doctor M.A. Busé in a scheme to steal the Romanov family's black diamond.

== Cast ==
Actor	Role
Peter Haber	Dr. Max Adrian Busé (M.A. Busé)
Ulf Brunnberg	Ragnar Vanheden
Björn Gustafson	Dynamit-Harry
Birgitta Andersson	Doris
Björn Granath	Nils Loman
Pontus Gustafsson	Konrad Andersson
Bernt Lindkvist	Egon Holmberg
Per Grundén	Wall-Enberg
Weiron Holmberg	Biffen
Lena T. Hansson	Mimmi
Elias Ringqvist	Lillis
Rikard Wolff	Count Romanoff
Ulf Eriksson	Patient
Jan Mybrand	Doctor
Ulf Friberg	Student
Suzanne Ernrup	Witness
