= Varning för Jönssonligan =

Varn!ng för Jönssonligan
- Directed by: Jonas Cornell
- Written by: Henning Bahs, Rolf Börjlind, Erik Balling
- Based on: Olsen Gang by Erik Balling; Henning Bahs
- Produced by: Ingemar Ejve
- Starring: Gösta Ekman; Ulf Brunnberg; Nils Brandt; Siw Malmkvist
- Cinematography: Roland Sterner
- Edited by: Solveig Nordlund
- Music by: Ragnar Grippe
- Distributed by: Svensk Filmindustri
- Release date: 4 December 1981
- Running time: 89 min
- Country: Sweden
- Language: Swedish

Varning för Jönssonligan ('Beware of the Johnson Gang') is a Swedish film about the gang Jönssonligan made in 1981.

It was the first Swedish adaptation of one of the original Danish Olsen-banden movies. Somewhat ironically, it was based on the sixth Olsen Gang movie, Olsen-bandens sidste bedrifter, which was intended as the last one when it was made.

== Cast ==
Actor	Role
Gösta Ekman	Charles-Ingvar "Sickan" Jönsson
Ulf Brunnberg	Ragnar Vanheden
Nils Brandt	Rocky
Siw Malmkvist	Eivor
Per Grundén	Wall-Enberg Jr.
Jan-Olof Strandberg	Svensson
Tomas Norström	Holm
Weiron Holmberg	Biffen
Johannes Brost	Robber
Peter Hüttner	Robber
