= Niklas Falk =

Swedish actor

Niklas Daniel Falk (born 28 January 1947 in Örgryte, Gothenburg) is a Swedish actor. His brother is actor Jonas Falk. Falk was educated at NAMA in Gothenburg. He worked at Gothenburg City Theatre until 1988. 1990 he moved to Stockholm and Stockholm City Theatre.

== Filmography ==
- 2015 – Jönssonligan – Den perfekta stöten
- 2009 – The Girl Who Kicked the Hornets' Nest
- 2008 – Oskyldigt dömd
- Wallander – Innan frosten (2005)
- As It Is in Heaven (2004)
- 2003 – Norrmalmstorg
- Stackars Tom (2002)
- 2002 - Cleo
- 2001 – Rederiet
- 2001 - Agnes
- 2001 – Woman with Birthmark
- En förälskelse (2001)
- Jönssonligan spelar högt (2000)
- 2000 – Brottsvåg
- Dödlig drift (1999)
- Stjärnsystrar (1999)
- 1999 – Reuter & Skoog
- 1998 – OP7
- 1998 – Ivar Kreuger
- 1998 – Zingo
- Den tatuerade änkan (1998)
- 1997 – Svensson Svensson
- Lilla Jönssonligan på styva linan (1997)
- Beck – Lockpojken (1997)
- Sånt är livet (1996)
- 1996 – Skilda världar
- Rusar i hans famn (1996)
- 1995 - Tre kronor
- Petri tårar (1995)
- 1995 – Anmäld försvunnen
- Pillertrillaren (1994)
- 1991 – Svindlande affärer
- 1989 – Förhöret
- 1988 – Enligt beslut
- Jungfruresan (1988)
- 1984 – Taxibilder
- 1981 – Stjärnhuset
- 1974 – Fiskeläget
