= Julius Julskötare =

- Also known as: Kalenderhuset
- Genre: children
- Written by: Björn Barlach; Åke Cato
- Starring: Björn Skifs
- Country of origin: Sweden
- Original language: Swedish
- No. of seasons: 1
- No. of episodes: 24

Original release
- Network: TV1
- Release: 1 December – 24 December 1978

Related
- Fem myror är fler än fyra elefanter (1977); Trolltider (1979)

Julius Julskötare ("Julius Christmas Handler"), or Kalenderhuset ("The Calendar House"), is the Sveriges Television's Christmas calendar in 1978. When aired at TV1 in 1978, it had no official name, other than that of Christmas calendar.

== Plot ==
The main character, played by Björn Skifs, guides the viewers taking a look at some fictional companies.

== Video ==
On 23 October 2013, the series was released to DVD.
