= Lilla Jönssonligan =

1996–2006 Swedish film series

Lilla Jönssonligan film series
- From left to right: Ragnar, Sickan, Dynamit-Harry
- Directed by: Christjan Wegner (first three films); David Berron (fourth film)
- Written by: Björn Carlström; Mikael Hylin; Christjan Wegner; Anna Fredriksson
- Starring: Trio in first two films: Kalle Eriksson; Jonathan Flumee; Fredrik Glimskär; Trio in the third film: Conrad Cronheim; Buster Söderström; Anton Pettersson; Trio in the fourth film: Mikael Lidgard; Hugo Flytström; Axel Skogberg
- Music by: Michael B. Tretow
- Distributed by: Sonet Film AB
- Country: Sweden
- Language: Swedish

Lilla Jönssonligan (English: The Little Jönsson gang) is a Swedish film series that consists of four films. The film series is a spin-off of the original Jönssonligan film series, featuring the main characters as kids instead of adults. Unlike the "adult Jönssonligan", where the gang were bumbling anti-heroes, the "litte Jönssonligan" is often straight up heroic.

Unlike the regular Jönssonligan, the kid version was an original Swedish idea, with Denmark and Norway later following suit, with Olsen-banden Junior and Olsenbanden Jr. respectively.

== Films ==
Four feature films have been made as of 2020. Lilla Jönssonligan och cornflakeskuppen takes place in the 1950s and works as an origin story for the gang. Lilla Jönssonligan och stjärnkuppen does not take place in the same canon as the first three films or the original series as it is set in modern day.

Swedish title	Translated title	Release date
Lilla Jönssonligan och cornflakeskuppen	The Little Jönsson gang and the cornflakes coup	1996
Lilla Jönssonligan på styva linan	The Little Jönsson gang showing off	1997
Lilla Jönssonligan på kollo	The Little Jönssonleague at summer camp	2004
Lilla Jönssonligan och stjärnkuppen	The Little Jönssonleague and the star heist	2006

== Characters ==
The gang consists of the criminal genius Charles Ingvar "Sickan" Jönsson, hence the name Jönssonligan, and his two companions Harry (a.k.a. Dynamit-Harry) and Ragnar Vanheden.

The gang's arch-enemy is Morgan "Junior" Wall-Enberg and his henchman, Biffen. Loa Falkman plays Wall-Enberg "Senior" in all the films. Junior does not appear in the fourth film.

== Cast ==
=== Trio in the first two films ===
- Kalle Eriksson as Charles-Ingvar 'Sickan' Jönsson
- Jonathan Flumee as Ragnar Vanheden
- Fredrik Glimskär as Dynamit Harry

=== Trio in the third film ===
- Conrad Cronheim as Charles-Ingvar 'Sickan' Jönsson
- Buster Söderström as Ragnar Vanheden
- Anton Pettersson as Dynamit Harry

=== Trio in the fourth film ===
- Mikael Lidgarv as Charles-Ingvar 'Sickan' Jönsson
- Hugo Flytström as Dynamit Harry
- Axel Skogberg as Ragnar Vanheden
