= Lilla Jönssonligan på kollo =

- Directed by: Christjan Wegner
- Written by: Christjan Wegner
- Produced by: Christjan Wegner; Fredrik Holmström
- Starring: Conrad Cronheim; Buster Söderström; Anton Pettersson
- Music by: Jean-Paul Wall
- Distributed by: Sonet Film AB
- Release date: 23 January 2004
- Running time: 88 minutes
- Country: Sweden
- Language: Swedish

Lilla Jönssonligan på kollo (English: The Little Jönsson League at camp) is the third film in the Swedish Lilla Jönssonligan film series. It was released on January 23, 2004, in Sweden and was directed by Christjan Wegner.

The film was broadcast on the Swedish television channel TV4 on December 29, 2007.

== Cast ==
- Conrad Cronheim - Charles-Ingvar "Sickan" Jönsson
- Buster Söderström - Ragnar Vanheden
- Anton Pettersson - Harry Kruth
- Maja Dosthe - Doris
- Max Holmstrand - Junior
- Loa Falkman - Wall-Enberg
- Pia Johansson - Lawyer Gabrielsson
- Leif Andrée - Professor Rixil
- Cecilia Ljung - Miss Rask
- Tommy Andersson - Miss Fridh
- Roddy Benjaminson - Loket
- Sten Ljunggren - Groundkeeper in the school
- Magnus Eriksson - Principal
- Allan Nilsson - Captain on the Gotland boat
- Hampus Andersson - Biffen
- Lukas Benjaminsson - Junior's friend
- Wilhelm Fredriksson - Junior's friend
- Hans Mosesson - Stig
- Paul Tilly - Ulf Karlsson
