= 24th Guldbagge Awards =

Annual Swedish film awards ceremony

- Date: 6 March 1989
- Site: Berns salonger, Stockholm, Sweden

Highlights
- Best Picture: Katinka; Back to Ararat

The 24th Guldbagge Awards ceremony, presented by the Swedish Film Institute, honored the best Swedish films of 1988, and took place on 6 March 1989. Katinka and Back to Ararat shared the award for the Best Film.

== Awards ==
- Best Film:
  - Katinka by Max von Sydow
  - Back to Ararat by Jim Downing, Per-Åke Holmquist, Suzanne Khardalian and Göran Gunér
- Best Director: Max von Sydow for Katinka
- Best Actor: Tomas Bolme for Creditors
- Best Actress: Lena T. Hansson for Lethal Film
- Best Screenplay: Bengt Danneborn and Lennart Persson for Det är långt till New York
- Best Cinematography: Peter Mokrosinski for Friends
- Creative Achievement:
  - Jan Troell
  - Michal Leszczylowski
  - Lisbet Gabrielsson
- The Ingmar Bergman Award: Lars-Owe Carlberg
