= No Time to Kill (film) =

1959 film

- Directed by: Tom Younger
- Written by: Edward Maze; Tom Younger
- Produced by: Sven Nicou; Tom Younger
- Starring: John Ireland; Ellen Schwiers; Birgitta Andersson
- Cinematography: Bengt Lindström
- Edited by: Lennart Wallén
- Music by: Harry Arnold
- Production company: Freja Film
- Distributed by: Freja Film
- Release date: 20 March 1959
- Running time: 90 minutes
- Countries: Sweden; United Kingdom
- Language: Swedish

Med mord i bagaget is a 1959 Swedish/British thriller film co-production directed by Tom Younger and starring John Ireland, Ellen Schwiers and Birgitta Andersson. It was filmed in the English language, and was released in the United States in 1964 by Jerry Warren as No Time To Kill.

== Cast ==
- John Ireland as Johnny Greco
- Ellen Schwiers as Nina Christians
- Birgitta Andersson as Helle
- Frank Sundström as Hopkins
- Hans Strååt as Inspector Bergman
- Ralph Brown as Jens
- Erik Strandmark as Concierge
