= Back to Ararat =

1988 film

- Directed by: Jim Downing; Per-Åke Holmquist; Suzanne Khardalian; Göran Gunner; Göran Gunér
- Written by: Göran Gunner; Per-Åke Holmquist
- Release date: 4 November 1988
- Running time: 99 minutes
- Country: Sweden
- Languages: French; English; Armenian

Back to Ararat (Swedish: Tillbaka till Ararat) is a 1988 Swedish documentary film about the Armenian genocide. The film won the Guldbagge Award for Best Film at the 24th Guldbagge Awards. The film featured interviews with poet Gevorg Emin and his son Artashes Emin.
