= Det blir jul på Möllegården =

- Genre: Children's television
- Country of origin: Sweden
- Original language: Swedish
- No. of seasons: 1
- No. of episodes: 24

Original release
- Network: TV1
- Release: 1 December – 24 December 1980

Related
- Trolltider (1979); Stjärnhuset (1981)

Det blir jul på Möllegården ("Christmas Comes to Möllegården") is the Sveriges Television's Christmas calendar in 1980.

== Plot ==
The series described Scanian Christmas traditions, circa 100 years earlier. Animal slaughter scenes frightened some young viewers.
