= Go'natt Herr Luffare =

1988 film by Daniel Bergman

- Directed by: Daniel Bergman
- Screenplay by: Astrid Lindgren
- Produced by: Waldemar Bergendahl
- Cinematography: Dan Myhrman
- Edited by: Jan Persson
- Music by: Steve Dobrogosz
- Release date: 1988
- Running time: 29 minutes
- Country: Sweden
- Language: Swedish

Go'natt Herr Luffare is a 1988 Swedish film directed by Daniel Bergman and based on the novel of the same name by Astrid Lindgren.

== Plot ==
One night Sven, Anna and Stina have to stay home alone as their parents go to a funeral. Before the parents leave, they warn their children not to open the door to anybody and certainly not to a tramp. The children promise that. When Sven goes outside to check on the cat, he forgets to close the front door when entering. When it knocks outside the door, Sven automatically says "Come in". A few seconds later he regrets that, remembering the promise he made to his parents, but then it is already too late and a tramp enters the house. Stina starts to cry, because she is afraid of the man, but the tramp, whose name is Manfred, manages to calm Stina down. He tries to entertain the children, sings, plays theatre, etc. The children are thrilled and laugh about the show Manfred offers them. Thus, the tramp manages to convince the children to give him something to eat. The children want to see more and more, but when he has finished eating, Manfred decides to leave. He goes outside into the cold and the snow. The children hope he will come back soon.

== Cast ==
- Björn Gustafson as Manfred
- Peter Hall as Sven
- Stina Lindmark as Anna
- Astrid Bräne as Lill-Stina
- Lena T. Hansson as Mamma
- Robert Broberg as Pappa

== Background ==
Go'natt Herr Luffare was first broadcast on 3 December 1988 in Sweden. Later it was also shown on German television. After that it was released on DVD in both Sweden and Germany. In the German version the film was cut into 25 minutes.

== Reception ==
=== Critical response ===
Filmtipset.se called Björn Gustafson's performance as the tramp Manfred "fantastic" and considered the film as funny but sometimes also a little scary.

Bernt Lindner from Kinder- und Jugendfilm Korrespondenz said that Go'natt Herr Luffare can be enjoyed by both, children (aged five and above) and adults.
