= Lethal Film =

1988 film

- Directed by: Suzanne Osten
- Written by: Etienne Glaser; Suzanne Osten; Niklas Rådström
- Starring: Lena T. Hansson
- Cinematography: Göran Nilsson
- Release date: 4 March 1988
- Running time: 109 minutes
- Country: Sweden
- Language: Swedish

Lethal Film (Swedish: Livsfarlig film) is a 1988 Swedish drama film directed by Suzanne Osten. Lena T. Hansson won the award for Best Actress at the 24th Guldbagge Awards.

== Cast ==
- Stina Ekblad as Menaden
- Agneta Ekmanner as Görel Key
- Björn Gedda as Labbtekniker
- Etienne Glaser as Emil
- Lena T. Hansson as Ingrid Stromboli
- Gunilla Röör as Ella
- Bo Samuelson as Ljudtekniker
- Lars Wiik as Skådespelare
- Rikard Wolff as Sminkör
- Philip Zandén as Philip Zandén
