= Björn Gustafson =

Swedish actor

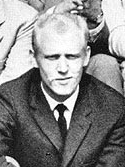
- Gustafson in 1961.
- Born: Björn Herman Leonard Gustafson; 30 November 1934 (age 91); Stockholm, Sweden
- Occupation: Actor
- Years active: 1956–present
- Spouse: Gisela Gustafson (m. 1962)

Björn Herman Leonard Gustafson (born 30 November 1934) is a Swedish actor. He was born in Stockholm and has appeared in 93 films and television shows since 1956. He starred in the 1965 film Love 65, which was entered into the 15th Berlin International Film Festival.

In Sweden, he is most famous for his recurring roles as the small-time alcoholic explosives expert Dynamit-Harry in Jönssonligan and as the kind farmhand Alfred in the Emil i Lönneberga series.

== Selected filmography ==
- Playing on the Rainbow (1958)
- Miss April (1958)
- Sängkammartjuven (1959)
- Rider in Blue (1959)
- Siska (1962)
- Hide and Seek (1963)
- Love 65 (1965)
- Ormen (1966)
- Badarna (1968)
- Emil i Lönneberga (1971)
- New Mischief by Emil (1972)
- Emil and the Piglet (1973)
- Den vita stenen (1973)
- To Be a Millionaire (1980)
- Marmalade Revolution (1980)
- Jönssonligan och Dynamit-Harry (1982)
- Åke and His World (1984)
- Jönssonligan får guldfeber (1984)
- Jönssonligan dyker upp igen (1986)
- Go'natt Herr Luffare (1988)
- Jönssonligan på Mallorca (1989)
- The Ox (1991)
- Jönssonligan och den svarta diamanten (1992)
- Jönssonligans största kupp (1994)
- En fyra för tre (1996–97)
- Jönssonligan spelar högt (2000)
- Outside Your Door (2002)
- Hotell Kantarell (2008/2010)
- Någon annanstans i Sverige (2011)
- Selmas saga (2016)
