= Det är långt till New York =

1988 film

- Directed by: Bengt Danneborn
- Written by: Bengt Danneborn; Lennart Persson
- Produced by: Hans Danneborn
- Starring: Erik Kiviniemi
- Cinematography: Bengt Danneborn
- Release date: 12 February 1988
- Running time: 113 minutes
- Country: Sweden
- Language: Swedish

Det är långt till New York is a 1988 Swedish drama film directed by Bengt Danneborn. Danneborn and Lennart Persson won the award for Best Screenplay at the 24th Guldbagge Awards.

== Cast ==
- Erik Kiviniemi as Jouni Mäkinen
- Lars Litens as Martin Holmbäck
- Ewa Carlsson as Karin
- Eva Remaeus as Maj
- Margreth Weivers as Sigrid Holmbäck
- Yvonne Schaloske as Anna
