= Carl-Magnus Dellow =

Swedish actor

Carl-Magnus Dellow (born Andersson; 25 October 1951 in Valleberga, Sweden) is a Swedish actor. He is married to the opera singer Eva Österberg.

Dellow was a member of the theatre-society Proteus where he learnt about acting. After studying at Swedish National Academy of Mime and Acting 1974–77 he worked at Norrbottensteatern. He has also been engaged at Folkteatern i Gävleborg, the Royal Dramatic Theatre (1988–present) and Turteatern.

== Selected filmography ==
- 1987 – Mälarpirater
- 1991 – Tre kärlekar (TV)
- 1993 – Sune's Summer
- 1993 – Mannen på balkongen
- 1993 – Kådisbellan
- 1994 – Jönssonligans största kupp
- 1997 – Reine & Mimmi i fjällen!
- 1997 – Emma åklagare (TV)
- 1997 – Rederiet (TV)
- 1998 – Pistvakt – En vintersaga (TV)
- 2001 – Hamilton (TV)
- 2005 – Pistvakt
- 2006 – LasseMajas detektivbyrå (TV series)
