= Tommy Andersson (actor) =

Swedish actor

Lars Artur Tommy Andersson (19 November 1962 in Norrköping – 15 October 2013) was a Swedish actor.

== Selected filmography ==
- 2010 - Himlen är oskyldigt blå
- 2008 - Oskyldigt dömd (TV)
- 2007 - Se upp för dårarna
- 2007 - Wallander – Pyramiden
- 2006 - Van Veeteren – Moreno och tystnaden
- 2005 - Saltön (TV)
- 2004 - Strandvaskaren
- 2004 - Lilla Jönssonligan på kollo
- 2003 - En utflykt till månens baksida
- 2002 - Beck – Annonsmannen
- 2000 - Jalla! Jalla!
- 2000 - Livet är en schlager
- 2000 - Rederiet (TV)
- 1998 - Zingo
- 1995 - Naken
