= Trolltider =

- Genre: children
- Written by: Camilla & Maria Gripe
- Directed by: Christina Lagerson
- Starring: Eva Rydberg; Birgitta Andersson; Håkan Serner; Ted Åström; Stig Järrel; Lena-Pia Bernhardsson; Siw Malmkvist
- Country of origin: Sweden
- Original language: Swedish
- No. of seasons: 1
- No. of episodes: 24

Production
- Producer: Ulla Berglund

Original release
- Network: TV2
- Release: 1 December – 24 December 1979

Related
- Julius Julskötare (1978); Det blir jul på Möllegården (1980)

Trolltider ("Troll Times") is the Sveriges Television's Christmas calendar in 1979. It's one of the titles in the 2009 book Tusen svenska klassiker (2009).

== Plot ==
The series revolves around characters from folk tales of old times.

== Episodes ==
1. Gläntan vaknar
2. Gula solar och svarta
3. Den flygande faran
4. Feer kan inte ljuga
5. Hemkomsten
6. Tjo för vinden!
7. En synlig, en osynlig
8. Draken Eldtungas hämnd
9. Förvandlingen
10. Människor har för mycket
11. Falska häxans skratt
12. Häck Väck Våt Fläck
13. Lucia, hår och stearin
14. Tjo för livet!
15. Trollsnuva och Vätteluva
16. Muller från berget
17. Viskande speglar
18. Firulist och Firulara
19. Hjältar och Hjältemod
20. Bergatrollet gångar sig att sova
21. Katastrofen
22. När trollen samlas
23. Trolleborgen
24. Stilla natt

== Reruns ==
Reruns were aired in December 1985, and between 23 December 1994 – 25 January 1995.

A reboot was made in 2023: Trolltider – legenden om Bergatrollet
