= Barbro Oborg =

Swedish actress

- Born: Barbro Christina Oborg; 3 July 1941 (age 84); Stockholm, Sweden
- Occupation: Actress
- Years active: 1960–present
- Spouse(s): Sten Ljunggren (m. 1968; div. 1979), (m. 1991)
- Children: 3

Barbro Christina Oborg Ljunggren (born 3 July 1941) is a Swedish actress. She is married to Sten Ljunggren.
