= Jerusalem (1996 film) =

- Directed by: Bille August
- Written by: Bille August
- Based on: Jerusalem by: Selma Lagerlöf
- Starring: Maria Bonnevie; Ulf Friberg; Lena Endre; Pernilla August; Olympia Dukakis; Sven-Bertil Taube; Reine Brynolfsson; Jan Mybrand; Max von Sydow; Viveka Seldahl; Björn Granath; Sven Wollter; Johan Rabaeus; Hans Alfredson; Mona Malm
- Release date: 6 September 1996 (Sweden)
- Running time: 168 minutes
- Countries: Sweden; Denmark; Norway
- Language: Swedish
- Box office: $2 million (Sweden)

Jerusalem is a film which was released to cinemas in Sweden on 6 September 1996, directed by Bille August, based on the 1901-1902 two-part novel Jerusalem by Selma Lagerlöf. The film, also broadcast as a TV-series, was a Scandinavian co-production headed by Svensk Filmindustri. The film was selected as the Swedish entry for the Best Foreign Language Film at the 69th Academy Awards, but was not accepted as a nominee.

The cast includes Ulf Friberg, Sven-Bertil Taube, Maria Bonnevie, Pernilla August, Max von Sydow, Reine Brynolfsson, Lena Endre, Olympia Dukakis, Michael Nyqvist, Mona Malm, Sven Wollter, Hans Alfredson, Viveka Seldahl and Johan Rabaeus.

== Plot ==
The novel and the film were inspired by real events from the end of the 19th century, a time when many people left Europe to find a better life abroad. The story revolves around a number of struggling families from northern Sweden who share a strong Christian belief in the impending end of the world. After a long journey, these families choose to settle on the outskirts of Jerusalem, where they take up farming and build a new future, waiting for Judgement Day. A series of claimed visions only add to the difficulty of life in their adopted country, and with growing hardship and the loss of family members, some in the group decide to return to Sweden, while others stay.

== Cast ==
- Ulf Friberg as Ingmar
- Maria Bonnevie as Gertrud
- Pernilla August as Karin
- Reine Brynolfsson as Tim
- Lena Endre as Barbro
- Jan Mybrand as Gabriel
- Sven-Bertil Taube as Helgum
- Björn Granath as Storm
- Viveka Seldahl as Stina
- Mona Malm as Eva Gunnarsdotter
- Hans Alfredson as Mats Hök
- Max von Sydow as Vicar
- Olympia Dukakis as Mrs. Gordon
- Annika Borg as Gunhild
- Johan Rabaeus as Eljas
- Sven Wollter as Stor-Ingmar
- Mats Dahlbäck as Hans Berger
- Anders Nyström as Sven Persson
- Claes Esphagen as Forrester
- Fredrik Ohlsson as Lawyer
- John Gunnarson as Jesus
- Torsten Sjöholm as Gunnar Höök
- Michael Nyqvist as Carpenter 1
- Lasse Almebäck as Carpenter 2
- André Beinö as childhood Ingmar (credited as André Beijnö)
- Stina Wargert as Gertrud (child)
- Sydnee Blake as American woman
- Mel Cobb as American man
- Nils Eklund as Innkeeper
- Lars Engström as Doctor
- Rolf Jenner as Big man 1
- Christer Flodin as Big man 2
- Viktor Friberg as Saw worker
- Douglas Johansson as Lars Tipers
- Katherine Kjellgren as American girl
- Jan Sjödin as Gabriel's father
- Eva Stellby as Gabriel's mother
- Stina von Sydow as Servant girl
- Cilla Thorell as Russian girl
- Amanda Steen as Greta
- Tindra Laurén as Greta (little girl)
- Galina Pavlovna Soboleva as Russian woman
- Valeri Dmitrievitj-Lisenkov as Russian man 1
- Pavel Oetrovitj-Ostroukhouv as Russian man 2

== Reception ==
=== Box office ===
The film was one of the most popular Swedish films of the year with a gross in excess of $2.3 million.

=== Critical response ===
Jerusalem has an approval rating of 80% on review aggregator website Rotten Tomatoes, based on 5 reviews, and an average rating of 6.4/10.

=== Awards and nominations ===
Lena Endre won the Swedish Guldbagge Award as Best Supporting Actress, and the film was nominated in several other categories.

== See also ==
- List of submissions to the 69th Academy Awards for Best Foreign Language Film
- List of Swedish submissions for the Academy Award for Best International Feature Film
