= Faithless (2000 film) =

- Swedish DVD cover
- Directed by: Liv Ullmann
- Written by: Ingmar Bergman
- Produced by: Maria Curman; Kaj Larsen; Johan Mardell
- Starring: Lena Endre; Erland Josephson; Krister Henriksson
- Cinematography: Jörgen Persson
- Edited by: Sylvia Ingemarsson
- Music by: Ian Cederholm
- Distributed by: AB Svensk Filmindustri
- Release dates: 13 May 2000 (Cannes); 14 September 2000 (Sweden/Norway)
- Running time: 154 minutes
- Country: Sweden
- Language: Swedish

Faithless (Swedish: Trolösa) is a Swedish film directed by Liv Ullmann from a script by Ingmar Bergman. The story is loosely based on experiences of adultery from Bergman's own life. It was entered into the 2000 Cannes Film Festival.

== Plot ==
An aging director (named "Bergman") conjures in his imagination the central character, Marianne. He interviews her to compose the story of her life-changing affair. Marianne had been happily married to Markus, an orchestra conductor, with a young daughter Isabelle. Her best friend is David, who is seeking funding for a film project. When Markus is away, David approaches Marianne and they go to Marianne's home. There, David surprises her by asking her if they can sleep together. Marianne asserts she sees David more as a brother; she eventually agrees they can sleep in the same bed in nightwear and without sexual relations. However, the two note they are both planning to be in Paris, France, for separate projects. Markus is aware of their travel plans, and Marianne speculates she and David can meet in Paris, and they would not have to deceive Markus about seeing each other there. In Paris, Marianne and David begin their affair. David also asks Marianne about her sexual history, and Marianne shares her list of experiences; but this mostly consists of her relations with Markus, who she said had satisfied her in ways no one else had. This triggers a violent jealous reaction in David.

David and Marianne continue their affair after returning from Paris. Markus realises they are having an affair and eventually discovers the two together. Markus begins to seek a divorce, and seeks full custody of Isabelle. Marianne gets a lawyer, who tells her Markus has the upper hand, given her desertion of the home. Marianne moves in with David and the two plan to get married; Marianne becomes pregnant with his child. Her lawyer advises that these improved conditions could help her custody case. Markus eventually reaches out to Marianne to meet him alone to settle the custody case, ostensibly for Isabelle's sake. Despite David's angry objections, she agrees to go. At the meeting, Markus blackmails her for sex in exchange for custody.

Marianne confesses to the affair to David. The two separate and Marianne has an abortion. After hearing Markus has committed suicide, Marianne learns he had also been unfaithful with his page-turner. Bergman bids farewell to Marianne, but she says she suspects they will meet again.

== Cast ==
- Lena Endre – Marianne
- Erland Josephson – Bergman
- Krister Henriksson – David
- Thomas Hanzon – Markus
- Michelle Gylemo – Isabelle
- Juni Dahr – Margareta
- Philip Zandén – Martin Goldman
- Thérèse Brunnander – Petra Holst
- Marie Richardson – Anna Berg
- Stina Ekblad – Eva
- Johan Rabaeus – Johan
- Jan-Olof Strandberg – Axel
- Björn Granath – Gustav
- Gertrud Stenung – Martha

== Release ==
The film opened 14 September 2000 in Sweden and Norway. It opened on 22 screens in Sweden and grossed $104,615 for the week, ranking in sixth place at the Swedish box office. In Norway, it grossed $53,455 for the week from 18 screens, ranking eighth at the Norwegian box office.

== Accolades ==
Award	Date of ceremony	Category	Recipient(s)	Result	Ref(s)
European Film Awards	2 December 2000	Best Film	Johan Mardell	Nominated	
European Film Awards	2 December 2000	Best Actress	Lena Endre	Nominated	
Guldbagge Awards	2001	Best Actress	Lena Endre	Won	

== TV series ==
A six-part television drama series, also called Faithless (Trolösa), was directed by Swedish director Tomas Alfredson, with a screenplay written by Norwegian screenwriter Sara Johnsen. Starring Gustav Lindh, Frida Gustavsson, Lena Endre (who starred in the film), Jesper Christensen, and August Wittgenstein, the series premiered on SVT on 26 January 2025, and was scheduled to be released on other platforms, including Apple TV.
