= Per Grundén =

Swedish singer and actor

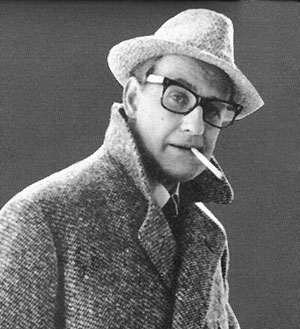
- Grundén in 1961.
- Born: Per Gustaf Grundén; 23 May 1922; Eskilstuna, Sweden
- Died: 6 February 2011 (aged 88); Trosa, Sweden
- Occupations: Actor, singer
- Years active: 1945–2002
- Spouse: Susanne Gneiser (m. 1948)
- Children: 3

Per Gustaf Grundén (23 May 1922 – 6 February 2011) was a Swedish singer and actor. He spent a substantial part of his career performing in Vienna at the State Opera and the Volksoper. Later in his operatic career he moved from the romantic lead roles to character parts. He became a screen actor, playing in a large number of Swedish films in the 1980s.

== Life and career ==
Grundén was born in Eskilstuna, Sweden. He studied at the Royal College of Music in Stockholm. His teachers included the Scottish singer and vocal teacher Joseph Hislop. He made his debut as a singer playing Sporting Life in Porgy and Bess at the Stora Theatre in Gothenburg. He remained at the Stora until 1949, when he joined the company of the Oscar Theatre in Stockholm.

As a guest artist, Grundén appeared also at the Royal Opera, in Stockholm, in lyric tenor roles in opera and operetta. He made a particular success in the role of Symon in Der Bettelstudent. In 1953 he joined the company of the Vienna State Opera, appearing in opera and operetta roles. His roles there included the title part in Fra Diavolo, Paris in La belle Hélène and Danilo in The Merry Widow, through 1955. He also performed at the Vienna Volksoper. In 1958, his contribution to music in Vienna was marked by his appointment as Kammersänger. He left the Vienna Volksoper in 1963, but returned to make guest appearances.

Grundén played Danilo in many opera houses in Germany, including Hamburg, Munich and the Deutsche Oper am Rhein. In Sweden he sang the role in a production at the Malmö City Theatre under the direction of Ingmar Bergman in 1954. From 1967 Grundén took to playing character roles. In 1967 he created the role of Lustigs-Per in Skinnarspelet by Rune Lindstrøm and Jan Johansson, written specially for him. He played it in most years until 1982.

In his later career, Grundén acted in Swedish films, including the popular film series Jönssonligan about an inept trio of gangsters. In the satirical comedy Äppelkriget (1971), he played the role of the German businessman Jean Volkswagner.

For the gramophone, Grundén recorded the role of Danilo for Decca in the first stereophonic recording of The Merry Widow, produced in 1958 by John Culshaw, with Hilde Gueden, Waldemar Kmentt and Emmy Loose and the Vienna Philharmonic Orchestra conducted by Robert Stolz. In 1978 he sang in the LP "Ömsom Wien, ömsom Vatten", a collection of Viennese songs and Swedish sea shanties.

Grundén died in Trosa, Sweden, at the age of 88.

== Filmography ==
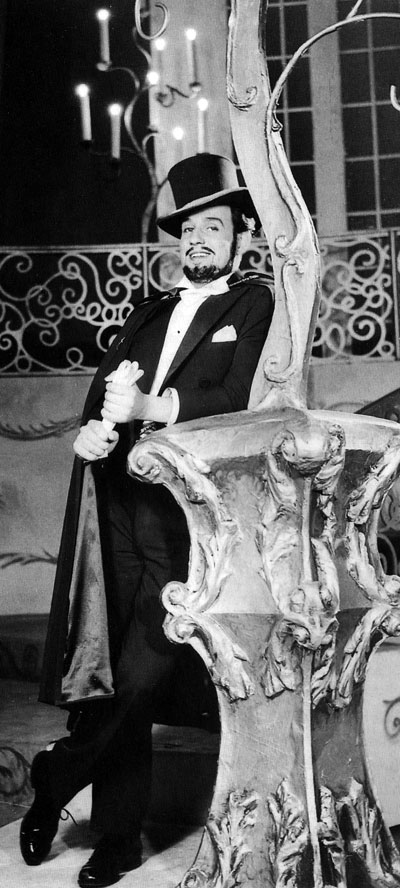
Grundén as Danilo in The Merry Widow at Malmö Stadsteater in 1954.

Year	Title	Role	Notes
1949	Bohus Battalion	112 Pelle Holm	
1950	My Sister and I	Baron Göran von Kullenberg	
1951	Sköna Helena	Prince Paris	
1971	The Apple War	Jean Volkswagner, dir, Schweiz	
1973-1974	Någonstans i Sverige	Komminister Stenberg	3 episodes
1978-1982	Hedebyborna	Selim Zetterlind	15 episodes
1981	Varning för Jönssonligan	Wall-Enberg	
1982	Jönssonligan och Dynamit-Harry	Wall-Enberg	
1982	Sagan om Heidi		
1984	Jönssonligan får guldfeber	Wall-Enberg	
1985	Smugglarkungen	Mr. Kron	
1986	Jönssonligan dyker upp igen	Wall-Enberg	
1989	Jönssonligan på Mallorca	Wall-Enberg	
1992	Jönssonligan och den svarta diamanten	Wall-Enberg	
1995	Jönssonligans största kupp	Wall-Enberg	
1997	Tre kronor	Pjotr Larinov	8 episodes
2000	Jönssonligan spelar högt	Wall-Enberg	
