= Jan Mybrand =

Swedish actor (born 1959)

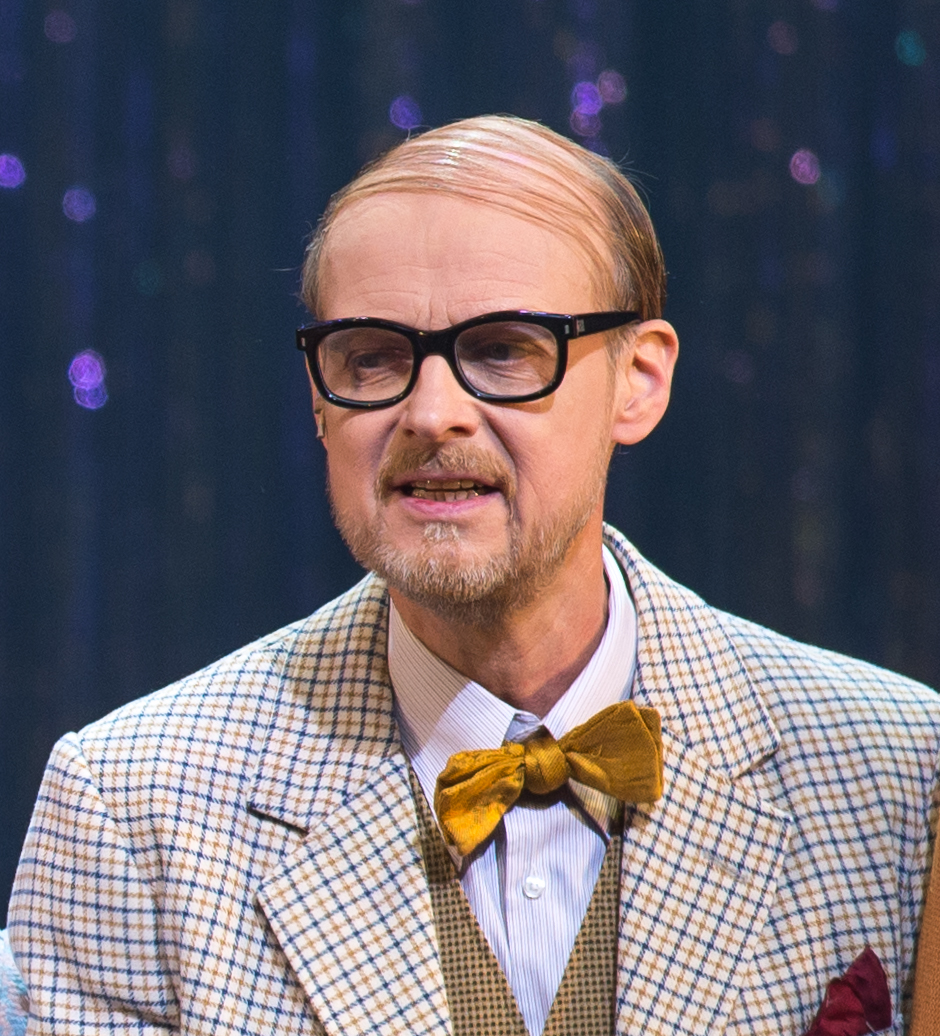
Jan Mybrand in 2019

Jan Torsten Mybrand (born 26 January 1959 in Kolsva, Köping Municipality, Sweden) is a Swedish actor.

Mybrand was educated at the Royal Dramatic Training Academy and after that he practised at Gävle Folkteater. Since 1986 he works at Stockholm City Theatre.

== Selected filmography ==
- 1987: Nionde kompaniet - Persson
- 1990: Black Jack - Kaj
- 1992: House of Angels - Per-Ove Ågren
- 1992: Jönssonligan och den svarta diamanten - Vårdare
- 1993: Sista dansen - Journalist (uncredited)
- 1994: Änglagård – andra sommaren - Per-Ove Ågren
- 1995: Jönssonligans största kupp - Nattvakten
- 1995-1997: Sjukan (TV Series) - Patrik Larsson
- 1996: Jerusalem - Gabriel
- 1996: The Disappearance of Finbar - Immigration Officer
- 1997: Selma & Johanna – en roadmovie - Per
- 1997: Kalle Blomkvist och Rasmus - Professor
- 1998: Beck (TV Series) - Karlberg
- 1999: Vägen ut - Ralf
- 1999: Stjärnsystrar - Johan
- 2000: Det blir aldrig som man tänkt sig - Christoffer
- 2000: Hundhotellet – En mystisk historia - Picasso (voice)
- 2000: Vingar av glas - Priest
- 2001: Sprängaren - Olof Faltin
- 2002: C/o Segemyhr (TV)
- 2004: Kärlekens språk - Ulf
- 2005: Kommissionen (TV Series) - Leif, skolminister
- 2007: Underbar och älskad av alla - Boström
- 2008: Vi hade i alla fall tur med vädret – igen - Hans
- 2009: Män som hatar kvinnor - Economic director (uncredited)
- 2009: Kenny Begins - Rutger Oversmart
- 2009: Wallander (TV Series) - Greger Frankman
- 2009: Mannen under trappan (TV Mini-Series) - Ulf
- 2009: Mera ur kärlekens språk - Ulf
- 2009: Playa del Sol (TV Series) - Krister Aspelin
- 2010: Kommissarie Späck - Roger
- 2010: Änglagård – tredje gången gillt - Per-Ove Ågren
- 2017: Same Same - Mr. Lonely
- 2017: The Wife - Arvid Engdahl
- 2018: Tårtgeneralen - Helicopter Pilot
- 2020: Pool - Micke
