= Cecilia Ljung =

Swedish actress (born 1961)

Ylva Cecilia Larsdotter Ljung (born 4 April 1961) is a Swedish actress known for her roles on stage and screen. She graduated from the Malmö Theatre Academy in 1985.

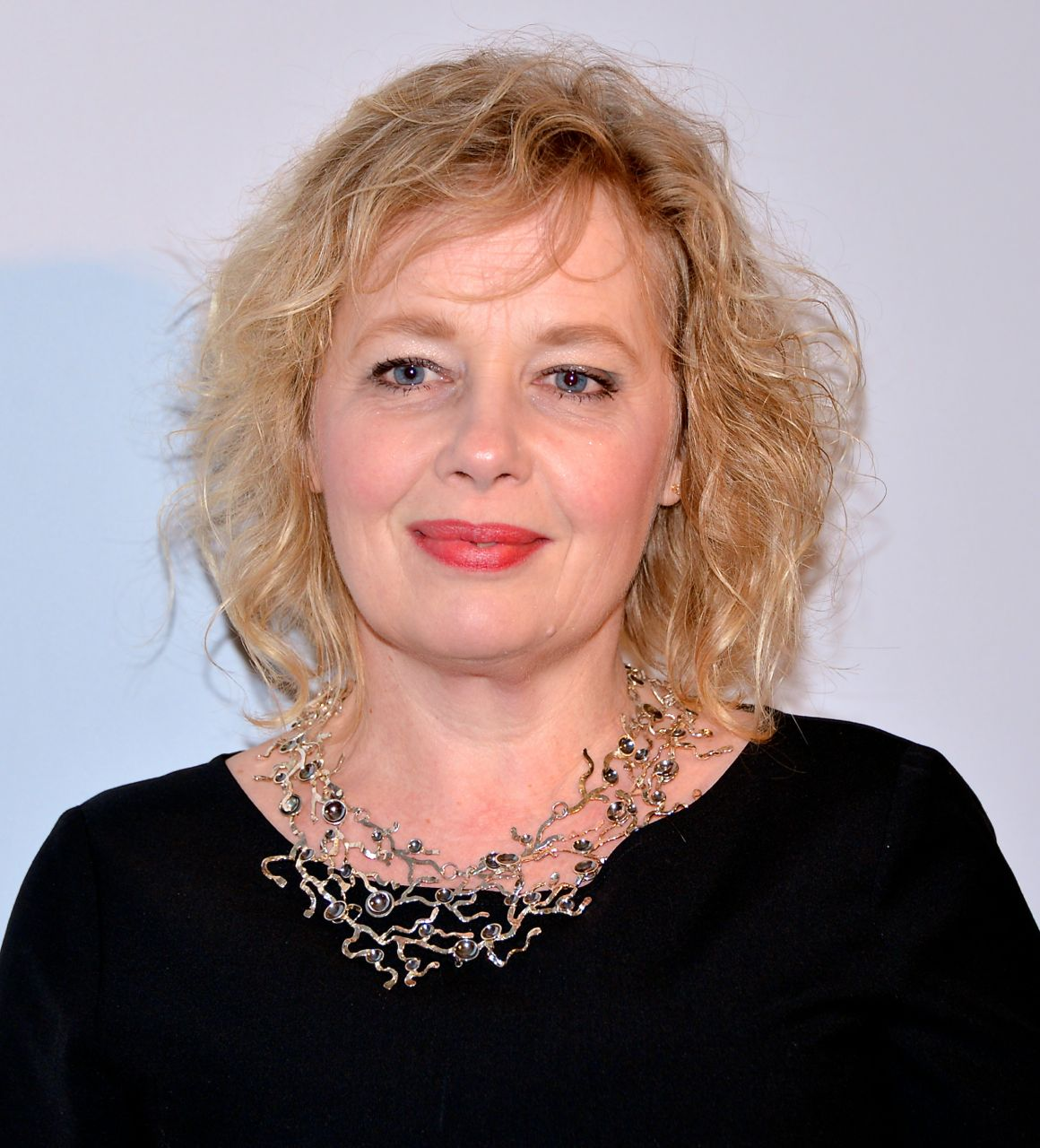
Ljung during the swedish Guldbagge Awards 2013.

== Selected filmography ==
- 1989 - Tre kärlekar (TV)
- 1994 - Rederiet (TV)
- 1995 - Evil Ed
- 1997 - Pelle Svanslös (TV, Julkalendern)
- 1998 - The Last Contract
- 1999 - Vuxna människor
- 2000 - Pelle Svanslös och den stora skattjakten
- 2001 - Beck – Hämndens pris
- 2001 - A Song For Martin
- 2001 - En ängels tålamod (TV)
- 2003 - Hem till Midgård (TV)
- 2004 - The Ketchup Effect
- 2004 - Lilla Jönssonligan på kollo
- 2008 - Höök (TV)
- 2013 - Waltz for Monica
