= Hotell Kantarell =

- Genre: Children's program
- Directed by: Mikael Hellström
- Voices of: Cecilia Olin; Sara Denward; Thomas Lundqvist
- Country of origin: Sweden
- Original language: Swedish
- No. of episodes: 12/season

Production
- Running time: approx 13 min per ep.

Original release
- Network: Kanal 1 on SVT
- Release: 19 October 2007 – 2010

Hotell Kantarell is a Swedish TV series mainly aimed at children.

== Plot ==
The story focuses on the receptionist glow worm Lucia, the ever optimistic bumble bee Marimba and the resident guest grasshopper Åke T Grönqvist and uses a Hotel in a Cantharellus (mushroom) as a backdrop. Live action guests check in and stir up drama for the characters.

== Sources ==
- ""Mupparna"på svenska ny barnserie" - Article in Sydsvenskan
