= Bertil Norström =

Swedish actor

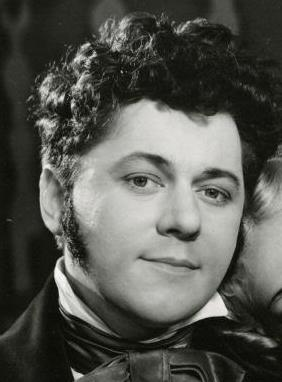
Bertil Norström

Per Bertil Norström (9 September 1923 – 6 September 2012) was a Swedish actor. Born in Sala, he was married to the actress Margreth Weivers from 1947 until his death.

== Selected filmography ==
- 1956 - The Staffan Stolle Story
- 1967 - I Am Curious (Yellow)
- 1970 - A Swedish Love Story
- 1970 - Skräcken har 1000 ögon
- 1972 - Nya hyss av Emil i Lönneberga
- 1972 - Ture Sventon
- 1973 - Pistol
- 1977 - Bröderna Lejonhjärta
- 1978 - Hedebyborna (TV)
- 1980 - Sverige åt svenskarna
- 1981 - Göta kanal eller Vem drog ur proppen?
- 1981 - Rasmus på luffen
- 1983/1984 - TV-piraterna
- 1984 - Panik i butiken (TV)
- 1987 - Varuhuset (TV)
- 1988 - Kråsnålen (TV)
- 1991 - Den ofrivillige golfaren
- 1992 - The Emperor of Portugallia
- 1995 - Sjukan (TV)
- 2007 - Hjälp! (TV)
- 2011 - Tjuvarnas jul (TV)
