= Jan-Olof Strandberg =

Swedish actor (1926–2020)

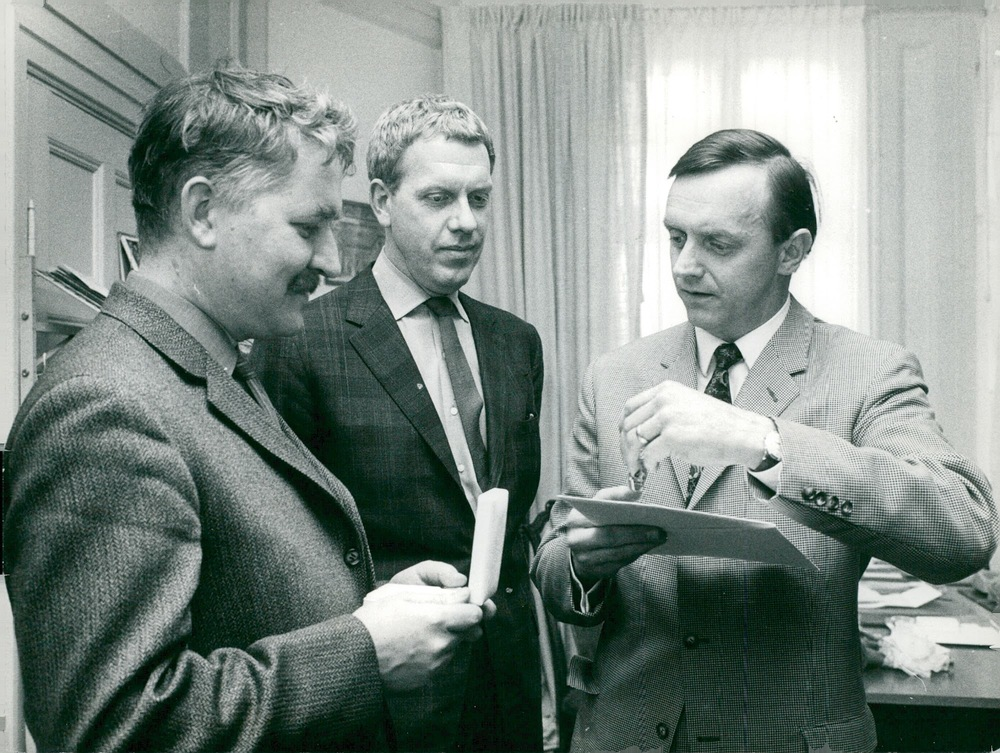
- Jan-Olof Strandberg presenting the Karl Gerhard Prize in 1968 to Hasse Alfredson and Tage Danielsson.
- Born: 9 September 1926; Stockholm, Sweden
- Died: 2 May 2020 (aged 93)
- Occupation: Actor
- Years active: 1947–2009

Jan-Olof Strandberg (9 September 1926 – 2 May 2020) was a Swedish stage and film actor. He appeared in 45 films since 1947. On stage one of his most famous parts was as Vladimir in Samuel Beckett's Waiting for Godot, at Sweden's Royal Dramatic Theatre (where he performed 85 parts over the years).

He appeared in Erland Josephson's play Blomsterplockarna ("The Flower Pickers") at the Royal Dramatic Theatre in 2006-2007, performed the part of Andrew in A. R. Gurney's play Kärleksbrev (Love Letters) at the Royal Dramatic Theatre, opposite Anita Björk in 2009.

== Selected filmography ==
- In the Arms of the Sea (1951)
- House of Women (1953)
- Wild Birds (1955)
- Last Pair Out (1956)
- A Dreamer's Journey (1957)
- Ön (1966)
- Varning för Jönssonligan (1981)
- Flight of the Eagle (1982)
- Resan till Melonia (1989)
- Faithless (2000)
