= Stjärnhuset =

- Genre: children
- Created by: Annika de Ruvo
- Starring: Sif Ruud; Johannes Brost
- Country of origin: Sweden
- Original language: Swedish
- No. of seasons: 1
- No. of episodes: 24

Original release
- Network: TV2
- Release: 1 December – 24 December 1981

Related
- Det blir jul på Möllegården (1980); Albert & Herberts julkalender (1982)

Stjärnhuset ("The Star House") is the Sveriges Television's Christmas calendar TV series mainly for children that was broadcast in 1981.

== Plot ==
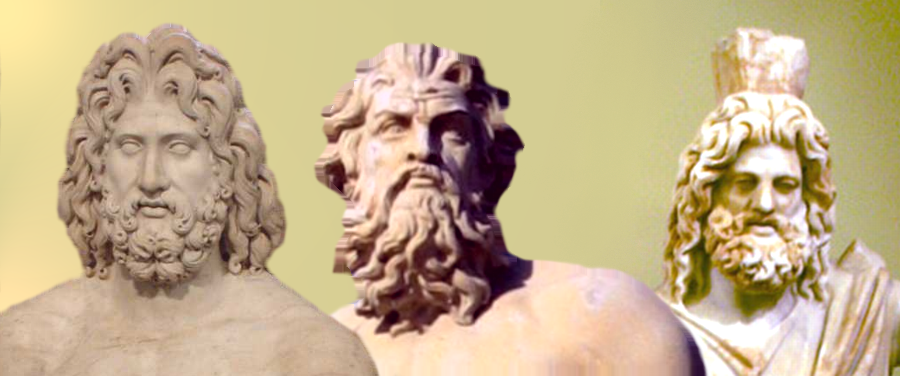
Astronomical facts were combined with contnet from Greek mythology.

Mytha, played by Sif Ruud, tells for Astro (Johannes Brost) about the constellations. Astronomy talk is mixed with stories from the Greek mythology.

== Video ==
The series was released to DVD on 26 October 2011.
