= Ulf Brunnberg =

Swedish actor

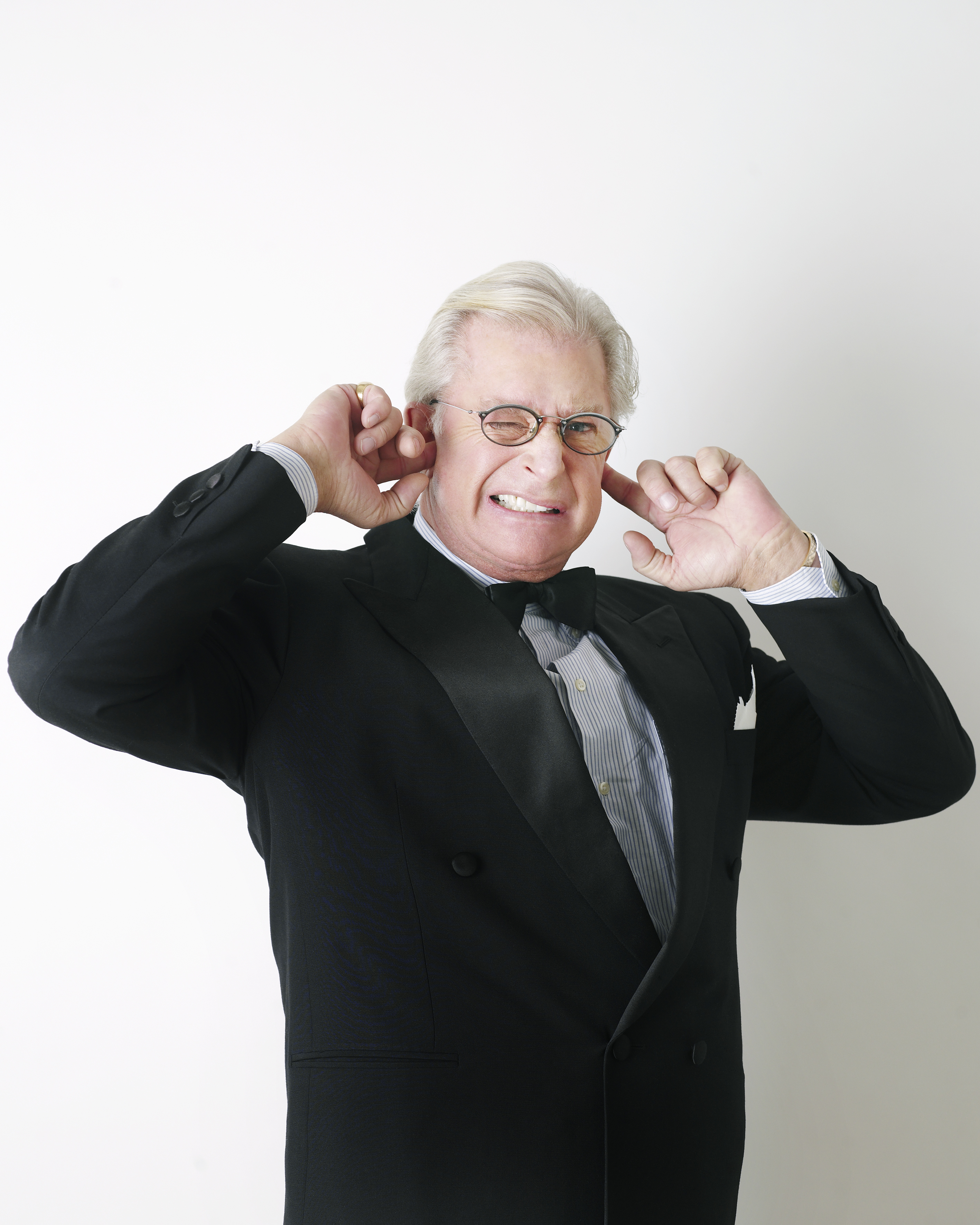
- Brunnberg in 2009
- Born: Hans Ulf Brunnberg; 7 April 1947 (age 78); Stockholm, Sweden
- Other names: Dumle
- Occupation: Actor
- Years active: 1968–present

Hans Ulf Brunnberg (born 7 April 1947) is a Swedish actor.

== Filmography ==
=== Film ===
Year	Title	Role	Notes	Ref.
1968	Lejonsommar	Jonas		
1968	Epiheirisis Apollon	Axel		
1968	Kvinnolek	Dancing Man		
1968	Komedi i Hägerskog	Dag Asping		
1968	Het snö	Hugin		
1969	Kameleonterna	Malcolm Fyhring		
1971	Smoke	Eric		
1973	Smutsiga fingrar	Jonas, Stefan's Partner		
1974	Bibban 49	Police Officer		
1975	Monismanien 1995	Court Secretary		
1975	Kärleksföreställningen	Work Mate		
1976	I lust och nöd	David		
1976	Scapins rackartyg	Sylvester		
1977	Pete's Dragon	Willie Rogan (Swedish voice)		
1979	Father to Be	Björn		
1980	Barna från Blåsjöfjället	TV-Producent		
1981	Varning för Jönssonligan	Ragnar Vanheden		
1981	Göta kanal eller Vem drog ur proppen?	Allan		
1982	Jönssonligan och Dynamit-Harry	Ragnar Vanheden		
1983	Lyckans ost	Allan		
1983	G – som i gemenskap	Allan		
1984	Jönssonligan får guldfeber	Ragnar Vanheden		
1984	Rosen	Alexander		
1985	Examen	Car Tester	Short film	
1986	Jönssonligan dyker upp igen	Ragnar Vanheden		
1988	Venus 90	Gangster		
1989	Jönssonligan på Mallorca	Ragnar Vanheden		
1992	Jönssonligan och den svarta diamanten	Ragnar Vanheden		
1995	Jönssonligans största kupp	Ragnar Vanheden		
1998	The Borrowers	Ocious P. Potter (Swedish voice)		
1998	A Bug's Life	Smolk (Swedish voice)		
2000	Jönssonligan spelar högt	Ragnar Vanheden		
2004	Fyra nyanser av brunt	Olle		
2006	The Wild	Larry (Swedish voice)		
2010	För kärleken	Bosse Krantz		
2011	Kong Curling	Rod Arne		
2018	Stackars Djur	Björn	Short film	

=== Television ===
Year	Title	Role	Notes	Ref.
1968	Exercis	Looping		
1968	Markurells i Wadköping	Johan Markurell		
1969	Solens barn	Misja		
1972–74	Bröderna Malm	Ulf Malm		
1973	Ett köpmanshus i skärgården	Åke Hjelm		
1974	Gustav III	Ribbing		
1975	Från A till Ö	Göran Gyllendröm		
1976	Kamrer Gunnarsson i skärgården	Man On His Way To Sandhamn		
1977	En bilförsäljare från Gotland	Peter		
1977	En by i provinsen	The Swede		
1978	Forskaren	Magnus Palmgren		
1979	Makten och hederligheten	Lindström		
1979	Barbies värld	Big Jim		
1979	Selambs	Manne von Strelert		
1980	Hyenan ler faktiskt inte...	Mendez		
1980	Vitsuellt	—		
1980	Från Boston till pop	Clas Amorin		
1980	Babels hus	Rabbe Chymander		
1980–81	Jul igen hos Julofsson	Julle		
1981	Lysistrate	—		
1982	Skulden	Commissar Bengtsson		
1982	Privatliv	—		
1983	Spanarna	Hugo Sörensson	Episode: "Golden Autumn"	
1983	Profitörerna	Svensson		
1984	Nya himlar och en ny jord	Eberhard Hamnström		
1985	Lösa förbindelser	Tom		
1985	The Wind on the Moon	—		
1986	Data Morgana	Karl Lindén		
1989	Familjen Schedblad	Bert C-son Dolm	Episode: "The Ice Prince"	
1991	1628	The Adjutant		
1991	Uppfinnaren	Boss		
1993	Nästa man till rakning	—	2 episodes	
1994–95	Tre Kronor	Hans Wästberg	26 episodes	
1995	Sjukan	Rutger Ahlenius		
1997	Detta har hänt	Olof Pettersson	2 episodes	
2005	Pappas lilla tjockis	Olle		
2006	Möbelhandlarens dotter	Restaurant keeper Carlstén		
2006	Mästerverket	Thorsten		
2007	Hon och Hannes	—	1 episode	
2007–08	Labyrint	Henry Strolz	10 episodes	
2010	Sture & Kerstin Forever	Sture		
