= Weiron Holmberg =

Swedish actor (1935–2026)

- Born: Weiron Valfrid Holmberg; 18 March 1935; Gothenburg, Sweden
- Died: 3 July 2026 (aged 91)
- Occupation: Actor
- Years active: 1978–2001

Weiron Valfrid Holmberg (18 March 1935 – 3 July 2026) was a Swedish actor. He appeared in more than 20 films and television shows from 1978. Holmberg died on 3 July 2026, at the age of 91.

== Filmography ==
Year	Title	Role	Notes
1978	The Score	Curt Storm	
1979	Repmånad	Tore Tallroth	
1980	Sällskapsresan	Robban Söderberg	
1981	Sista budet	Gamle Stan	
1981	Tuppen	Verkmästare Karlsson	
1981	Varn!ng för Jönssonligan	Biffen	
1981	Göta kanal eller Vem drog ur proppen?	Göteborgsfilosof	
1982	Jönssonligan och Dynamit-Harry	Biffen	
1984	Jönssonligan får guldfeber	Biffen	
1990	Kurt Olsson - filmen om mitt liv som mej själv	'Hinken' Johansson	
1991	Underground Secrets	Janitor	
1991	Bakhalt	Fritz	
1992	Jönssonligan och den svarta diamanten	Biffen	
1995	Jönssonligans största kupp	Biffen	
1996	Harry och Sonja	Harry's boss	
1997	Raymond - sju resor värre	Morbror Allan	
2000	Jönssonligan spelar högt	Biffen	
2001	Anderssons älskarinna	Basen	
