= Folkteatern i Gävleborg =

Coordinates: 60°40′40″N 17°8′28″E

Folkteatern i Gävleborg or Gävle Folkteater (The Folk Theatre in Gävleborg or Gävle Folk Theatre) is a regional theatre, opened in 1983, located in Gävle, Gävleborg County, Sweden.
