= Micke Dubois =

Swedish actor and comedian

- Photo of Micke Dubois from his late career
- Born: Mats Mikael Dubois; 25 February 1959; Solna, Stockholm, Sweden
- Died: 30 November 2005 (aged 46); Huddinge, Stockholm, Sweden
- Other names: Svullo; Captain Freak
- Occupations: Actor, comedian
- Years active: 1984–2005
- Partner: Gitte Nilsson (1995–2005)

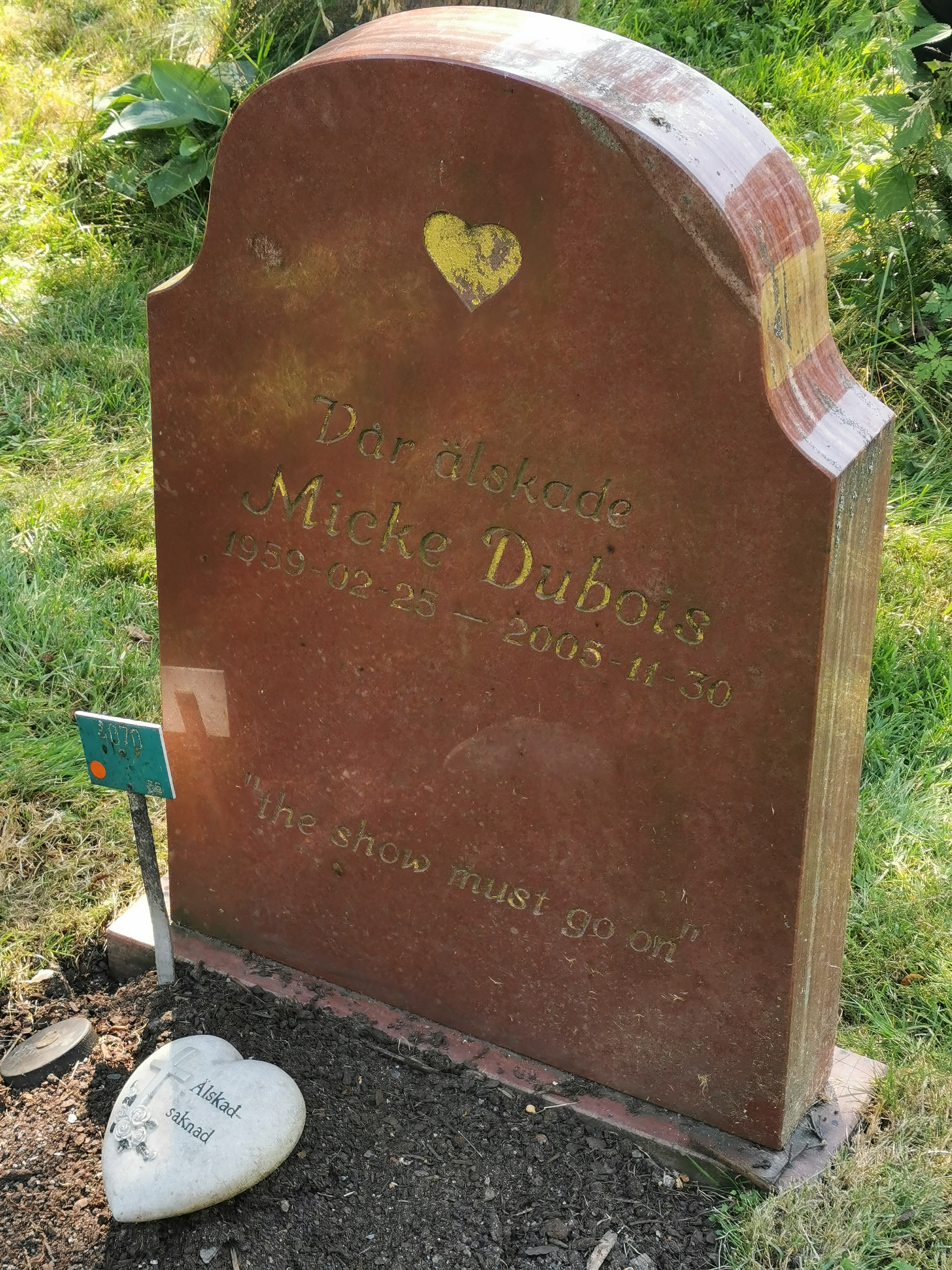
Micke Dubois' gravestone at Solna Church.

Mats Mikael "Micke" Dubois (25 February 1959 – 30 November 2005), also known as Svullo, was a Swedish actor and comedian.

Micke Dubois was born in Stockholm. He began his career when he entered an air guitar competition, where he came third (he actually played air bass and called himself "Sweden's only professional air bassist"). He later started performing at various rock clubs under the artist name Captain Freak.

In 1988 he got the idea for the character Svullo, a Swedish taunt name for obese people which is derived from his big body mass. He met Hans Crispin, and together they formed the duo Angne & Svullo for television. Svullo in particular was responsible for wrecking a number of cars - in the supposed name of comedy.

During the later years he participated in TV4, for example as host for Robot Wars (2002), and as a judge in the program Sveriges värsta ("Sweden's worst") (2005), where he was anointed as the "worst Swedish husband".

Dubois was found dead in his apartment's cellar on 2 December 2005. He had committed suicide by hanging. He was 46 years old.

== Biography ==
Dubois grew up in Solna, Stockholm. He wasn't very interested in education and liked sports more. He was very talented in ice hockey and tennis. He also was a prankster in school, which made him go to a special class. There, he was bullied for being thin.

Dubois never continued his studies and took some odd jobs. With the money he made, he went to the United States. At the time, bodybuilding was very popular and Dubois trained at the same gym as Arnold Schwarzenegger, gaining a lot of muscles. When he went back home to Sweden, he wanted to pursue a career as a comedian. He entered an air guitar contest in which he got the third place. Later, he performed a couple of times at the restaurant Berns. He then went famous and performed at the rock club Alexandra. His performance was very successful and he continued to perform there once a week in one year. It was during this time, 1988, that he got the idea of the character "Svullo".

Later in the same year, he met Hans Crispin. Together they formed the comedic duo "Angne och Svullo". The odd characters became favorites in Sweden, and later they made a movie.

Later in his career, Dubois made some more movies, for example the cult film Svullo Grisar Vidare. In 1990, he recorded the famous song "För fet för ett Fuck" (Too Fat for a Fuck) with rock band Electric Boys. The song was a huge hit, and climbed to the top of the Swedish charts in 1990. After recording more albums including För fet för ett omslag (Too fat for a cover), he started a tour with Griståget (The Pig Train), in which Eddie Meduza performed.

During the early 1990s, Dubois created a journalist character named Skägget (The Beard) who wore a fake goatee and made a series of home interviews named Hemma Hos (At Home) with Swedish celebrities, including Claes "Clabbe" af Geijerstam, Anna Lindh and Alice Timander.

In the late 1990s, Dubois starred in some TV productions, for example "Knäppa Klipp" (Crazy Clips) and "Robot Wars". He also directed a theatre play called "Hur man lyckas i showbusiness utan att bli utbränd" (How to succeed in show business without getting burned out).

In 2005, he committed suicide by hanging himself in his cellar. He is survived by his wife Gitte Nilsson and their three children.

== After death ==
The DVD Micke Dubois - Mycket Mer Än Bara Svullo (Micke Dubois - Much More Than Just Svullo) was released in 2006. It contained some Angne och Svullo sketches, bloopers and outtakes from Knäppa Klipp and a special tribute with celebrities including Ulf Malmros (who directed Den Elake Polisen), Markoolio and Sven Melander who all talked about the energy and charisma of Dubois.

== Filmography ==
- 1988 - Angne och Svullo
- 1989 - Den Elake Polisen
- 1990 - Svullo Grisar Vidare
- 1991 - V Som i Viking
- 1991 - 1628
- 1991 - Riktiga Män Bär Alltid Slips
- 1991 - Angne och Svullo "Här och Nu"
- 1996 - Lilla Jönssonligan och Cornflakeskuppen
- 1997 - Lilla Jönssonligan På Styva Linan
- 1997 - En Fyra för Tre
- 1999 - Lukas 8:18
- 2000 - Sex, Lögner och Videovåld
- 2000 - Naken
- 2006 - Micke Dubois - Mycket Mer Än Bara Svullo (posthumous)
