= Yvonne Schaloske =

Swedish actress (1951–2020)

Yvonne Schaloske (23 August 1951 – 1 April 2020) was a Swedish actress. She was born in Borås.

Schaloske starred in many Swedish movies and in TV shows, most notably the soap opera Rederiet. She retired from acting after the series ended in 2002, and then worked as an airport security officer and a spin instructor.

She died in April 2020, at the age of 68.

== Selected filmography ==
- Det är långt till New York (1988)
- Night of the Orangutan (1992)
