= Sten Ljunggren =

Swedish actor (born 1938)

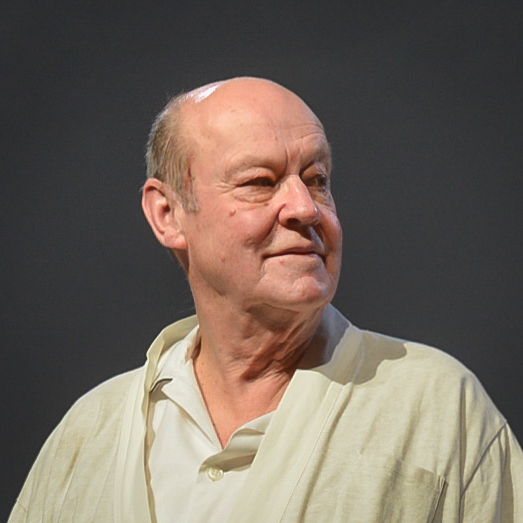
- Ljunggren in 2014
- Born: Sten Ivar Ljunggren; 16 October 1938 (age 87); Stockholm, Sweden
- Occupation: Actor
- Years active: 1975–present
- Spouses: Marianne Dyfverman (m. 1962–1967) Barbro Oborg (m. 1968; div. 1979) (m. 1991)
- Children: 3

Sten Ivar Ljunggren (born 16 October 1938) is a Swedish character actor. He played Henrik in the long-running Swedish drama TV series Svenska hjärtan, which aired between 1987 and 1998. Other notable roles includes criminal inspector Lennart Thorin in the TV mini-series based on the Lasermannen events, the retired doctor Axel Holtman in Skärgårdsdoktorn, the voice of Carl Fredricksen in the Swedish dub of Up, the voice of Sykes in the Swedish cinema dub of Oliver & Company, and the evil principal in Kenny Starfighter.

He played the lead role as Birger in Lukas Moodysson's last short film Talk. The same character, with some modifications, was used again in Moodysson's Together. Ljunggren reprised the role.

== Selected filmography ==
- 1978 – Lyftet
- 1984 – Jönssonligan får guldfeber
- 1987–1998 – Svenska hjärtan (TV series)
- 1987 – The Ninth Company
- 1988 – S.O.S. – En segelsällskapsresa
- 1988 – Oliver & Company (voice in Swedish dub)
- 1990 – S*M*A*S*H (TV series)
- 1992 – The Best Intentions
- 1993–2001 – Rederiet (TV series)
- 1997 – Talk (short film)
- 1997–2000 – Skärgårdsdoktorn (TV series)
- 1997 – Kenny Starfighter (TV series)
- 1997 – Beck – Monstret
- 1998–2000 – Pistvakt – En vintersaga (TV series)
- 1999 – C/o Segemyhr (TV series)
- 1999 – The Prince of Egypt (voice in Swedish dub)
- 1999 – Hälsoresan – En smal film av stor vikt
- 1999 – Deathly Compulsion
- 2000 – Together
- 2004 – Populärmusik från Vittula
- 2004 – Lilla Jönssonligan på kollo
- 2005 – Lasermannen (TV mini-series)
- 2007 – Gone with the Woman
- 2008 – Oskyldigt dömd (TV series)
- 2009 – Up (voice in Swedish dub)
- 2009 – The Temptation of St. Tony
- 2010 – Four More Years
- 2011 – Någon annanstans i Sverige
- 2020 – Mirakel (TV series)
- 2023 - Together 99 (Tillsammans 99)
- 2024 – Veronika (TV series)
