= Anna-Lotta Larsson =

Swedish singer and actress

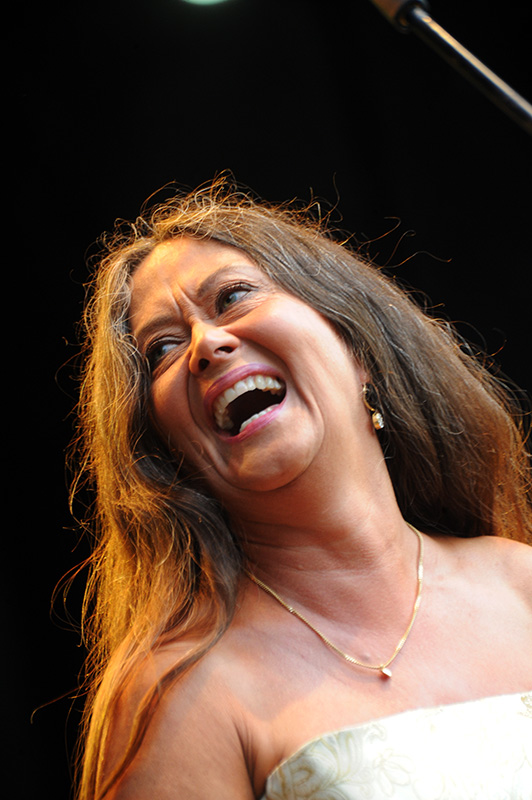
- Anna-Lotta Larsson during the Stockholm Folk Festival in August 2014.

Background information
- Born: 5 April 1954 (age 72); Karlstad, Sweden
- Years active: 1981–

Ingeborg Ann-Charlotte "Anna-Lotta" Larsson (born 5 April 1954) is a Swedish singer and actress. She was educated to be a voice coach at Framås folkhögskola and then was accepted into the Operahögskolan in Gothenburg. She is also an actress, known for her roles in the film Värmlänningarna in 1980 and the series Nya tider. She also presented the show Har du hört den förut? which was broadcast on SVT.

Anna-Lotta Larsson also dubs animated children's films.

== Discography ==
- 1985 – Natt efter natt
- 1986 – A piacère
- 1989 – Vädur
- 1990 – Tidvatten
- 1992 – Fem
- 1995 – Jag ser dig i smyg
- 1998 – Just vid den här tiden
- 2003 – Tidlöst
- 2004 – Känn en doft av kärleken
- 2007 – Kärleken förde oss samman
- 2010 – Saknad

== Filmography ==
- 1980 – Snövit och de sju dvärgarna (Voice of Snowwhite)
- 1981 – Göta kanal
- 1981 – Micke och Molle (Voice of Vixie)
- 1984 – Jönssonligan får guldfeber
- 1991 – Isbjörnskungen
- 1992 – Hassel – Utpressarna
- 1997 – Bondånger (TV-series)
- 1997 – En fyra för tre (TV-series)
- 1999 – Nya tider (TV-serie)
- 2002 – Lilo & Stitch (Swedish voice of Nani)
- 2004 – Kogänget
- 2006 – Ice Age 2
- 2009 – Karaokekungen
- 2013 – Frost (Swedish voice of Gerda)
