= Björn Granath =

Swedish actor (1946–2017)

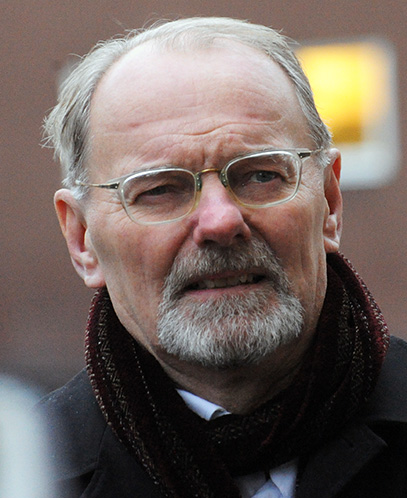
- Granath in 2014
- Born: Björn Gösta Tryggve Granath; 5 April 1946; Gothenburg, Sweden
- Died: 5 February 2017 (aged 70); Stockholm, Sweden
- Occupation: Actor
- Years active: 1968–2017
- Spouse: Ann-Margreth Fyrgård
- Children: 2

Björn Gösta Tryggve Granath (5 April 1946 – 5 February 2017) was a Swedish actor who appeared in over 100 films and television shows.

== Life and career ==
Granath was born in Örgryte, Gothenburg, Sweden. He starred in a broad range of roles from comedic to dramatic. He was active as an actor and director at the Royal Dramatic Theatre in Stockholm from 1987 to 2007. At the time of his death he had been due to play Buckingham in a production of Richard III at the Royal Dramatic Theatre in a revival of a popular production he had appeared in during 2014.

Granath was married to Ann-Margreth Fyrgård, and the couple had two children. He died on 5 February 2017, at the age of 70.

== Awards ==
- The Eugene O'Neill Award, 2003
- Litteris et Artibus, 2000

== Selected filmography ==
- Mistreatment (1969) - Björn
- Den magiska cirkeln (1970) - Hammarström
- Du gamla, du fria (1972) - Björn
- Du är inte klok, Madicken (1979) - Pappa
- Madicken på Junibacken (1980) - Pappa
- Svindlande affärer (1985) - Spelande affärsman
- Sällskapsresan 2 - Snowroller (1985) - Göte
- Demoner (1986) - Thomas
- Den frusna leoparden (1986) - Todd
- Min pappa är Tarzan (1986) - Skrothandlare
- Plastposen (1986) - Svensk seiler
- Mälarpirater (1987) - Father
- Los dueños del silencio (1987) - Editor
- Pelle the Conqueror (1987) - Erik
- Hunden som log (1989) - Rektorn
- Un paradiso senza biliardo (1991) - Administrator
- The Ox (1991) - Flyckt
- The Best Intentions (1992) - Oscar Åkerblom
- The Johnson Gang & the Black Diamond (1992) - Kommissarien
- Svart Lucia (1992) - Principal
- The Young Indiana Jones Chronicles (1993, TV Series) - Adler
- Pillertrillaren (1994) - Doctor
- Illusioner (1994) - Doctor
- A Life for the Taking (1995) - Björn Granath
- Vendetta (1995) - Bielke
- Poeten som slutade dikta (1995)
- Jerusalem (1996) - Storm
- The White Lioness (1996) - Björk
- Eye of the Eagle (1997) - Biskop Eskil
- Et hjørne af paradis (1997) - Professor Andersson
- Svenska hjältar (1997) - Ekonomen
- Synden är lömsk och listig (1997)
- Lithivm (1998) - Henrik Laurentsson
- Magnetisøren's femte vinter (1999) - Landshøvding Aspelin
- Sherdil (1999) - Arméchefen
- Faithless (2000) - Gustav
- Evert (2001)
- As White as in Snow (2001) - Sven Andersson
- Livet i 8 bitar (2002) - Ove
- Elina: As If I Wasn't There (2002) - Doctor
- Svidd neger (2003) - Presten
- Evil (2003) - Headmaster
- Tre solar (2004) - Vaktchefen
- Som man bäddar... (2005) - Olof
- Den utvalde (2005) - Erik Swahn
- Den enskilde medborgaren (2006) - Allan Dahlman
- Les Grandes Personnes (2008) - Pastor
- The Girl with the Dragon Tattoo (2009) - Gustav Morell
- Pax (2010) - Overlegen
- Sound of Noise (2010) - Hospital Manager
- The American (2010) - Hunter #2
- Nobels testamente (2012) - Ernst Ericsson
- The Last Sentence (2012) - Axel Forssman
- Den som söker (2013) - Eskil
- Her er Harold (2014) - Kamprad
- Så ock på jorden (2015) - Bjelke
- The Bridge (2015, TV Series) - Kjell
- Fallet (2017, TV Series) - Arne Arnesen
- Borg vs McEnroe (2017) - Bengt Grive
- Kingsman: The Golden Circle (2017) - The King of Sweden
- Vår tid är nu (2017, TV Series) - August Drugge (final appearance)
