= Johannes Brost =

Swedish actor (1946–2018)

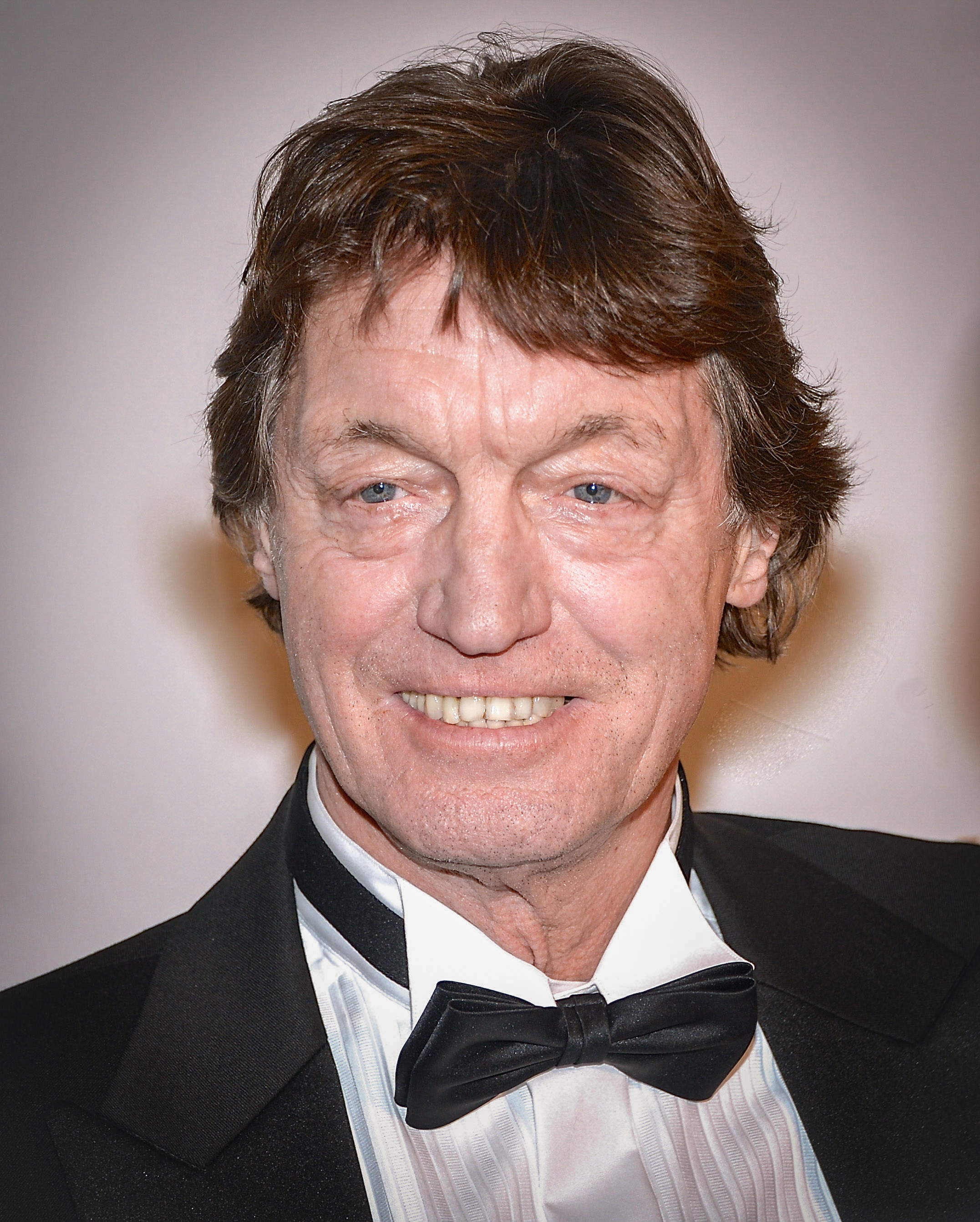
- Brost in 2013
- Born: Edvard Johannes Brost Forssell; 25 September 1946; Stockholm, Sweden
- Died: 4 January 2018 (aged 71); Lund, Sweden
- Occupation: Actor
- Years active: 1972–2018
- Children: 4
- Parents: Sven Forssell; Gudrun Brost

Edvard Johannes Brost Forssell (25 September 1946 – 4 January 2018) was a Swedish actor. He became recognized for his roles in the television programs Stjärnhuset and Rederiet; in Rederiet he appeared in 318 episodes. In 2013, he won a Guldbagge award for his role in the film Avalon. He also had several roles in theater.

== Biography ==
=== Early life ===
Born in Stockholm on 25 September 1946, Brost was the son of author and journalist Sven Forssell, and film and theater actor Gudrun Brost. The musician and actor Tomas Forssell—father of television and radio host Gry Forssell—was his half brother.

As a child, he did not want to be an actor like his mother, whom he sometimes accompanied to work. He later chose to start acting and applied to the Royal Dramatic Theatre drama school, but failed in the first round of auditions. He took private acting lessons with director Fred Hjelm and then he successfully applied to the Teaterhögskolan in Malmö. He graduated in 1970. After graduation he was employed by the Stockholm City Theatre, where he stayed for two years. After that he acted at Åbo Svenska Theater in Finland and then at the National Swedish Touring Theatre, Unga Teatern and Malmö City Theatre. He also took part in the Tältprojektet in 1977.

=== Career ===
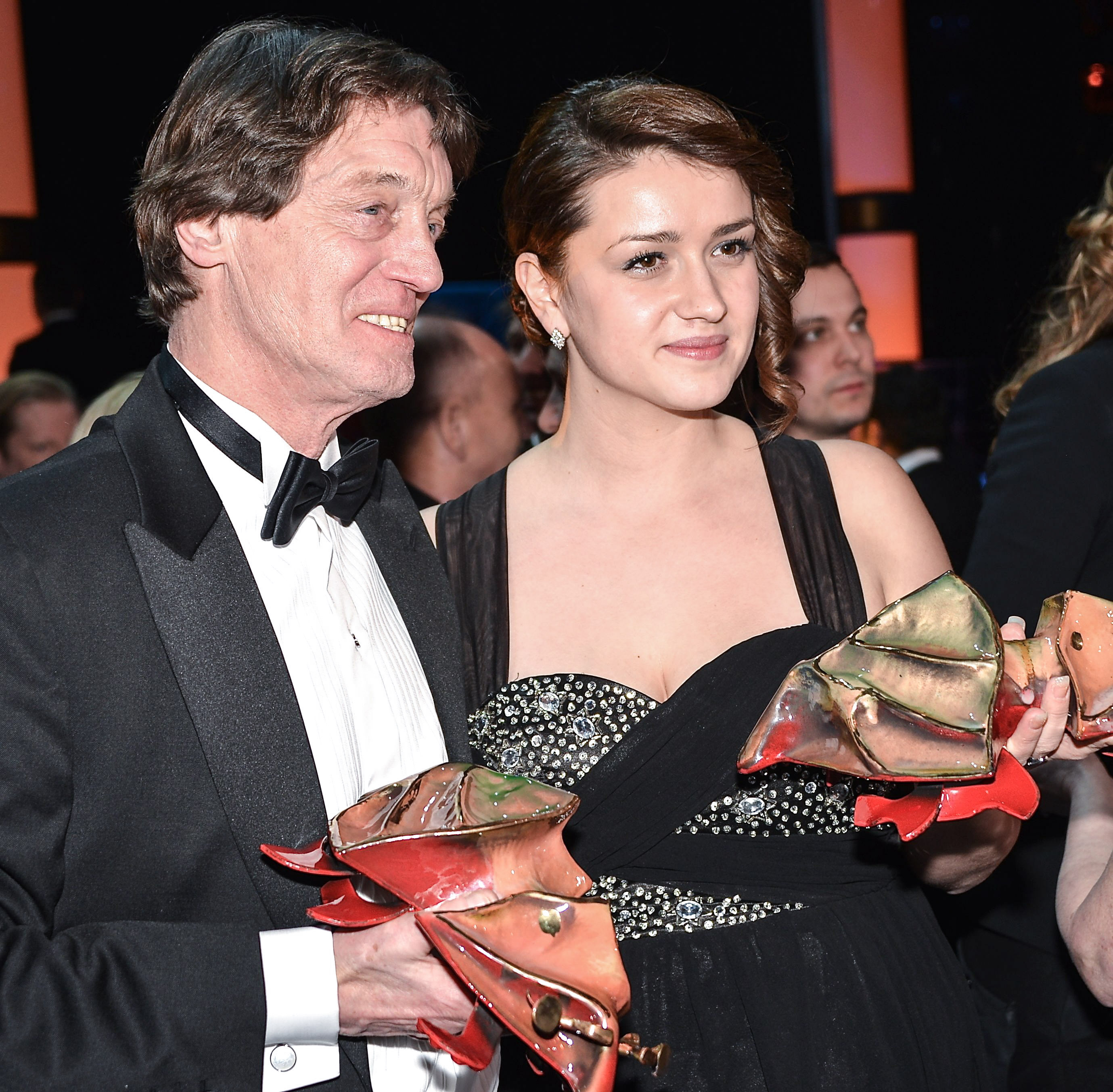
Johannes Brost and Nermina Lukac with their awards at Guldbaggem 21 January 2013

In 1981, he had the leading role in the SVT children's television program Christmas calendar titled Stjärnhuset, which won him national recognition. A year later Brost became a panelist on the ratings success Gäster med gester, which began airing on SVT; he also appeared in several pantomimes. He also participated in several comedy plays such as Bäddat för sex (A Bedfull of Foreigners) and Är du inte riktigt fisk at Chinateatern; Me and My Girl at Intiman in Stockholm and Kuta och kör at the Palladium in Malmö.

Brost became best known for his role as Joker the bartender in the television series Rederiet; he appeared in all 318 episodes of the series, which ran between 1992 and 2002. He also had roles in several films, including Black Jack, Änglagård, Jönssonligan dyker upp igen and The Visitors.

He was an honorary citizen of Laholm and produced several summer revue shows there. He also appeared in several plays directed by Eva Rydberg at Fredriksdalsteatern in Helsingborg.

In 2013, Brost won a Guldbagge award for his leading role in the 2011 film Avalon. He also played Pekka in the series Jordskott and appeared in the show Lilyhammer.

In 2016, Brost took part in the SVT show Stjärnorna på slottet, in which he spoke about his life and career. He also appeared as a celebrity dancer in Let's Dance 2017 on TV4. His last role, in December 2017, was that of Sievert Lindberg, a wealthy man interested in a friend of Dagmar Friman, in the SVT series Fröken Frimans krig.

== Personal life ==
Brost became friends with singer Mick Jagger after they met in 1965 when Jagger and the Rolling Stones performed in Malmö and went to a nightclub where Brost was working. When told about Brost's death, Jagger stated that "He was a wonderful guy" and that "We will miss his humour" and his generosity.

Brost had four children. He died from complications of esophageal cancer on 4 January 2018; he was to appear on a TV4 program, Tillsammans mot cancer (Together Against Cancer) on 8 January.

== Selected filmography ==
| Year | Film | Role | Notes |
|---|---|---|---|
| 1981 | Beware of the Johnson Gang | Robber | |
| 1981 | The Fox and the Hound | Copper (Swedish dubbing) | |
| 1981 | Stjärnhuset | Astro | TV series |
| 1982 | Gräsänklingar | Robber | |
| 1982 | Kalabaliken i Bender | Officer | |
| 1983 | Mickey's Christmas Carol | Ebenezer Scrooge (Swedish dubbing) | |
| 1983 | Den tragiska historien om Hamlet – prins av Danmark | Gyldenstern | TV series |
| 1986 | Min pappa är Tarzan | Curt | |
| 1986 | The Johnson Gang Resurface | The Man with the Iron Arm | |
| 1987 | Fadern, Sonen och Den Helige Ande... | The Seventh Man | |
| 1988 | The Visitors | Allan Svensson | |
| 1990 | Black Jack | Lennart | |
| 1991 | The White Viking | Kolbeinn | |
| 1992 | House of Angels | Fanny's American Friend | |
| 1992-2002 | Rederiet | Joker | TV series |
| 1992 | Go Hugo Go | Meatball Charlie (Swedish dubbing) | |
| 1994 | Good Night Irene | Eddie | |
| 2000 | 102 Dalmatians | Waddlesworth (Swedish dubbing) | |
| 2007 | Meet the Robinsons | Bowler Hat Guy (Swedish dubbing) | |
| 2009 | Bröllopsfotografen | Claes | |
| 2011 | Avalon | Janne | Won the Guldbagge for best actor |
| 2011 | Cars 2 | Mel Dorado (Swedish dubbing) | |
| 2012 | Sean Banan inuti Seanfrika | The Ambassador | |
| 2012 | Wither | Gunnar | |
| 2013 | Death of a Pilgrim | Mr. Persson | TV series |
| 2013 | Lilyhammer | Stanley | TV series |
| 2013 | Maria Wern: Först när givaren är död | Lennart | |
| 2013 | Studentfesten | Zacke' Father | |
| 2013 | Inarticulate Speech of the Heart | Joe | |
| 2014 | Min så kallade pappa | Frank's dad | |
| 2014 | Another Time, Another Life | Mr. Persson | |
| 2015 | Beck: The Family | Rimfors | |
| 2015 | Jordskott | Koljonen | |
