= Mona Seilitz =

Swedish film and television actress and entertainer (1943–2008)

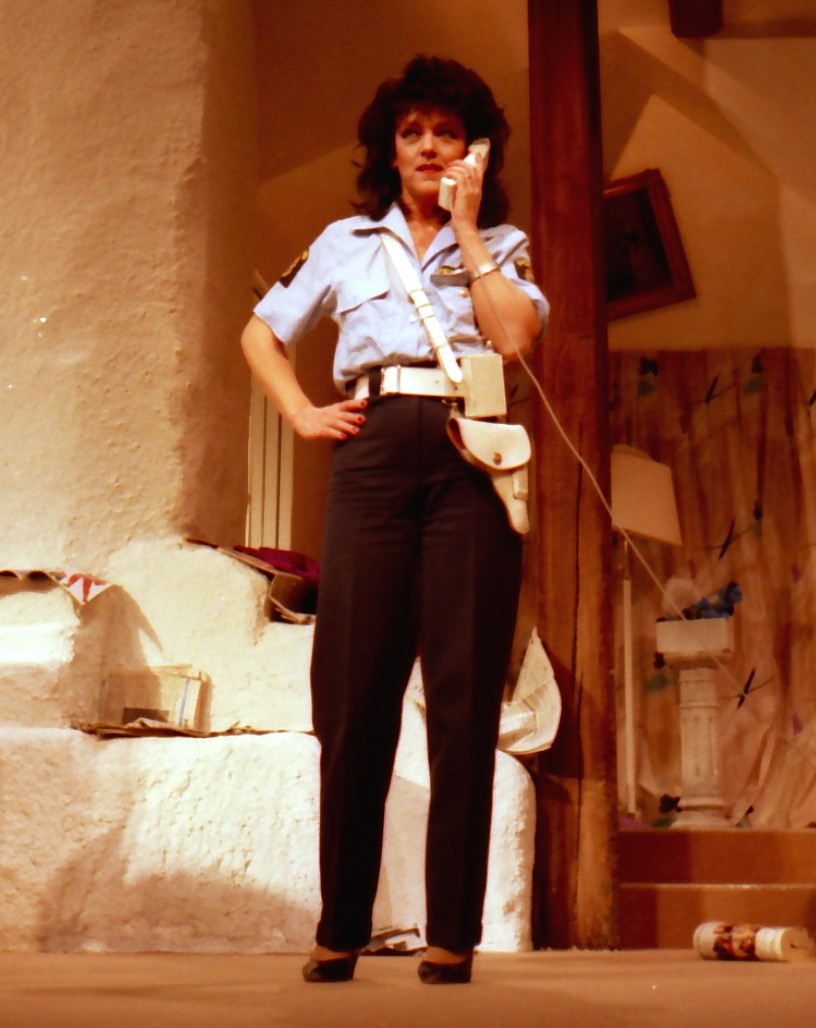
- Seilitz in The Odd Couple (1988).
- Born: Mona Elisabet Alexandersson; 16 January 1943; Malmö, Sweden
- Died: 2 April 2008 (aged 65); Malmö, Sweden
- Occupation: Actress
- Years active: 1968–2007
- Spouse(s): Jan-Erik Seilitz; Bill Öhrström (m. 1977–1989) Stefan Falk (m. 1990–1991)

Mona Elisabet Seilitz née Alexandersson (16 January 1943 – 2 April 2008) was a Swedish film and television actress and entertainer. Born in Malmö, she was considered to be a veteran of both Swedish dramatic and comedic television.

Seilitz also did vocal work for a number of Swedish language cartoons. She was cast as a lead actress in three Happy Life Animation family oriented animated films – Pettson och Findus - katten och gubbens år in 1999, Pettson och Findus - Kattonauten in 2000 and Pettson och Findus 3: Tomtemaskinen in 2005. Seilitz is also known for voicing the Swedish version of Cruella de Vil.

Seilitz died of breast cancer 2 April 2008, at the age of 65.

== Film and television ==
- 2007 – Bror och syster
- 2006 – Tjocktjuven
- 2003 – Belinder auktioner
- 2001 – Vita lögner
- 2000 – Hotel Seger
- 1996 – 101 dalmatiner (voice)
- 1994 – Stockholm Marathon
- 1990 – Hjälten
- 1989 – Miraklet i Valby
- 1989 – Vildanden (TV-theater)
- 1988 – Clark Kent
- 1986 – Julpussar och stjärnsmällar
- 1982 – Jönssonligan & Dynamit-Harry
- 1982 – Gräsänklingar
- 1981 – Babels hus
- 1981 – Snacka går ju
- 1981 – Operation Leo
- 1981 – Göta kanal
- 1980 – Sinkadus
- 1979 – Katitzi
- 1976 – Drömmen om Amerika
- 1976 – Mina drömmars stad
- 1975 – Giliap
- 1968 – Vargtimmen (minor role)
- 1968 – Fanny Hill
