= Johan Rabaeus =

Swedish actor

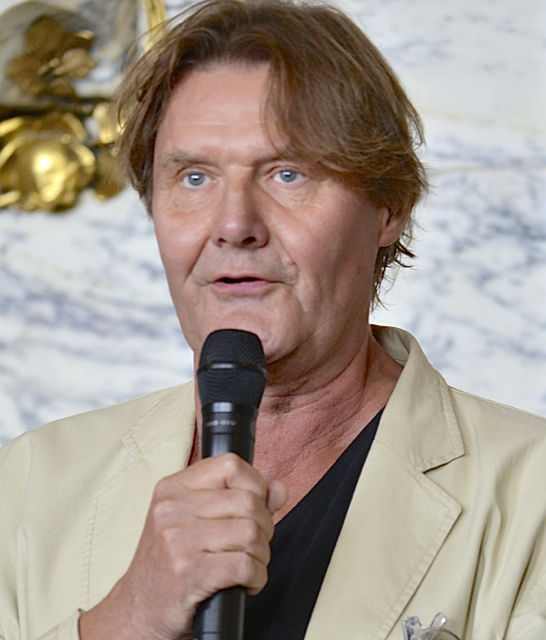
- Rabaeus in 2014.
- Born: Carl Magnus Johan Olof Rabéus; 31 July 1947 (age 78); Stockholm, Sweden
- Other names: Johan Rabeus; Johan Rabéus
- Occupation: Actor
- Partner: Camilla Thulin
- Parent(s): Bengt Rabaeus; Birgitta Svenson

Johan Rabaeus (born Carl Magnus Olof Johan Rabéus 31 July 1947) is a Swedish actor who was born in Stockholm but grew up in Paris and Geneva.

He is known for portraying very unpleasant characters, such as Erik Ponti's sadistic stepfather in the film Evil (2003). He participated in Let's Dance 2016 which was broadcast on TV4.

== Selected filmography ==
- 1988: S.O.S. – En segelsällskapsresa
- 1990: The Rabbit Man
- 1993: Lotta flyttar hemifrån
- 1995: Sommaren (The Summer)
- 1996: Jerusalem
- 1998: Beck – Öga för öga (Beck – An Eye for an Eye)
- 2000: Faithless (Swedish title: Trolösa)
- 2000: The Dog Hotel
- 2000: Jönssonligan spelar högt (The Johnson Gang Plays High)
- 2003: Evil (Swedish title: Ondskan)
- 2005: Kinamand
- 2006: Heartbreak Hotel
- 2010: Bröderna Karlsson
- 2011: Åsa-Nisse – wälkom to Knohult
- 2014: Tommy
- 2018: Greyzone
