= Lena T. Hansson =

Swedish actress

- Born: Lena Teresia Hansson; 18 May 1955 (age 70); Stockholm, Sweden
- Occupation: Actress
- Years active: 1974-present
- Partner: Peter Haber
- Children: 2

Lena Teresia Hansson (born 18 May 1955) is a Swedish actress. She was born in Stockholm and began acting at Vår teater, a children's theatre. She studied at Swedish National Academy of Mime and Acting in Stockholm. Hansson is in a relationship with fellow Swedish actor Peter Haber. At the 24th Guldbagge Awards she won the award for Best Actress for her role in Lethal Film.

== Selected filmography ==
- 2003 – Paradiset
- 1998 – Beck – Öga för öga
- 1994 – Sommarmord
- 1993 – Murder at the Savoy
- 1993 – Ni bad om det
- 1992 – Jönssonligan och den svarta diamanten
- 1991 – The Best Intentions
- 1990 – Saxofonhallicken
- 1990 – Ebba och Didrik
- 1989 – Codename Coq Rouge
- 1989 – Tre kärlekar
- 1989 – Flickan vid stenbänken
- 1988 – Go'natt Herr Luffare
- 1987 – Jim och piraterna Blom
- 1986 – The Mozart Brothers
- 1986 – Amorosa
- 1984 – Som ni vill ha det
- 1975 – A Guy and a Gal
- 1974 – En enkel melodi
