= Kent Andersson (playwright) =

Swedish actor

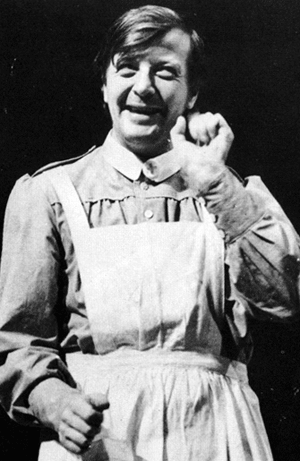
- Andersson in 1968
- Born: Kent Yngve Andersson; 2 December 1933 (age 92); Gothenburg, Sweden
- Died: 3 November 2005 (aged 71); Gothenburg, Sweden
- Occupation: Actor
- Years active: 1955–2005

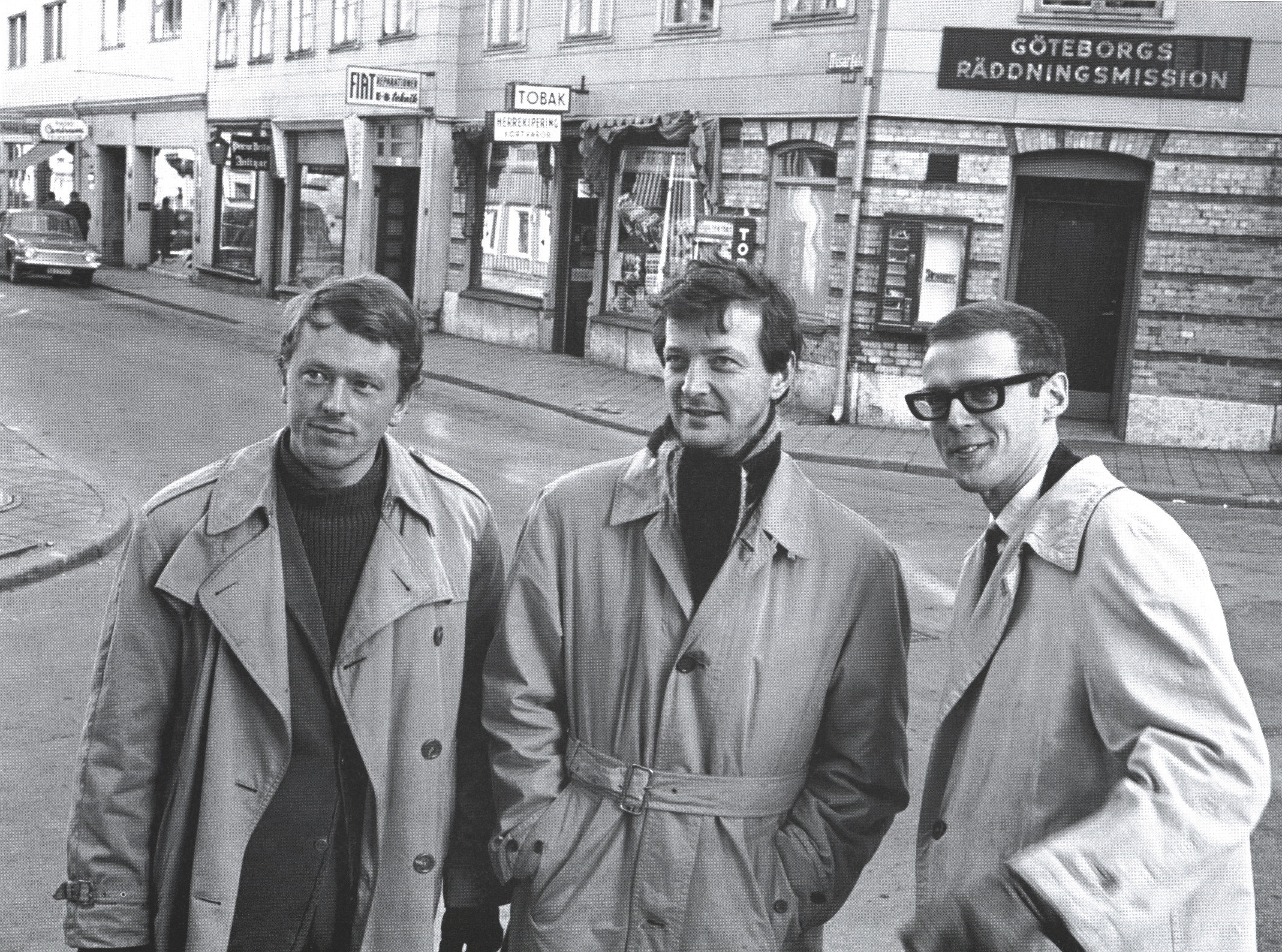
Bengt Bratt, Kent Andersson and Bo Hermansson on the set of Blå gatan, 1965

Kent Yngve Andersson (2 December 1933 – 3 November 2005) was a Swedish actor, theatre director and playwright.

Andersson was born in Gothenburg, Sweden. He wrote most of his plays from a leftist point of view, criticizing various injustices in society. He was extremely popular in his home town of Gothenburg, but was also widely known among the general Swedish public. He died in Gothenburg, aged 71.

== Filmography ==
=== Film ===
Year	Title	Role	Notes	Ref.
1955	Vildfåglar	Young Man At Bridge		
1963	Min kära är en ros	Sven		
1965	Love 65	Himself		
1965	Nattcafé	Lalle		
1968	Vindingevals	Alexander		
