= Dan Ekborg =

Swedish actor

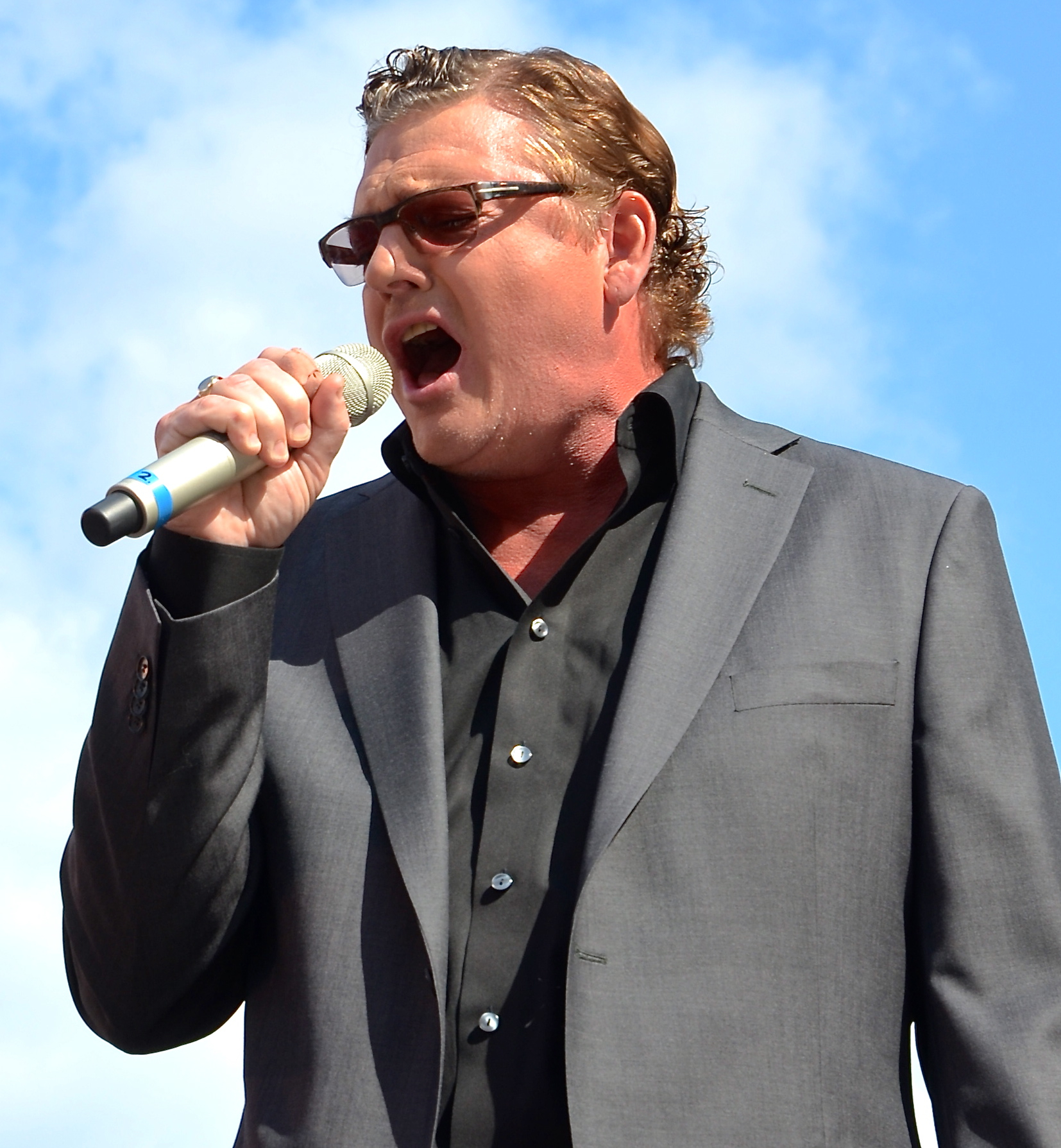
- Ekborg in 2012
- Born: Dan Peder Clemens Ekborg; 23 November 1955 (age 70); Stockholm, Sweden
- Occupation: Actor
- Spouses: Die Asplund (m. 1988–1991) Kao Lindström (m. 1992–1995) Malin Svensson (m. 1996–1999) Emma Svedlund (m. 2016)
- Children: 4
- Parents: Lars Ekborg (father); Lola Sjölund (mother)
- Relatives: Anders Ekborg (brother); Maud Ekborg (sister)

Dan Peder Clemens Ekborg (born 23 November 1955) is a Swedish actor. He is the son of actor Lars Ekborg and older brother of actor Anders Ekborg.

He has starred in many of the Swedish Jönssonligan films. He is also the Swedish voice for Hades in Disney's Hercules and the Swedish voice for Genie in Disney's Aladdin. He participated as a celebrity dance in Let's Dance 2019, which is broadcast on TV4
