= Peter Harryson =

Swedish actor, singer and entertainer (born 1948)

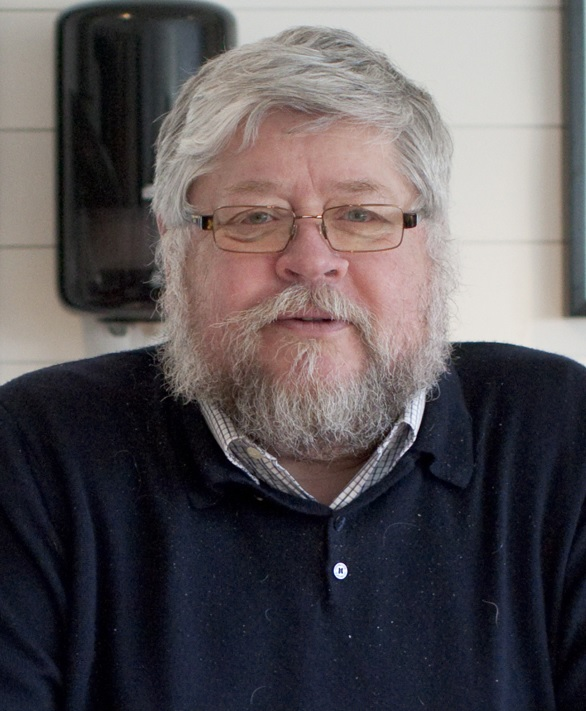
- Harryson in 2011
- Born: John Peter Kaj Harryson; 2 April 1948 (age 78); Norrköping, Sweden
- Occupations: Actor; singer; entertainer
- Years active: 1973–present
- Spouse: Charlotte Kuylenstierna (m. 1971)
- Children: 2
- Parent: John Harryson (father)

John Peter Kaj Harryson (born 2 April 1948) is a Swedish actor, singer, and entertainer. He is the son of actor John Harryson (1926–2008). From 1994 to 2001, Harryson played the antagonist Pehr Silver in the soap opera Rederiet. He is also known for hosting the game show Så ska det låta. In the 1980s, he worked extensively in dubbing cartoons into Swedish. Three of his most notable roles include pilot Roy Focker in the Swedish version of Macross: Do You Remember Love? Shaggy Rogers in the Scooby-Dooseries, and Ernie in Svenska Sesam (The second Swedish version of Sesame Street).

He was born on 2 April 1948 in Norrköping, Sweden. He married Charlotte Kuylenstierna in 1971. They have two children.
