= Kristallen den fina =

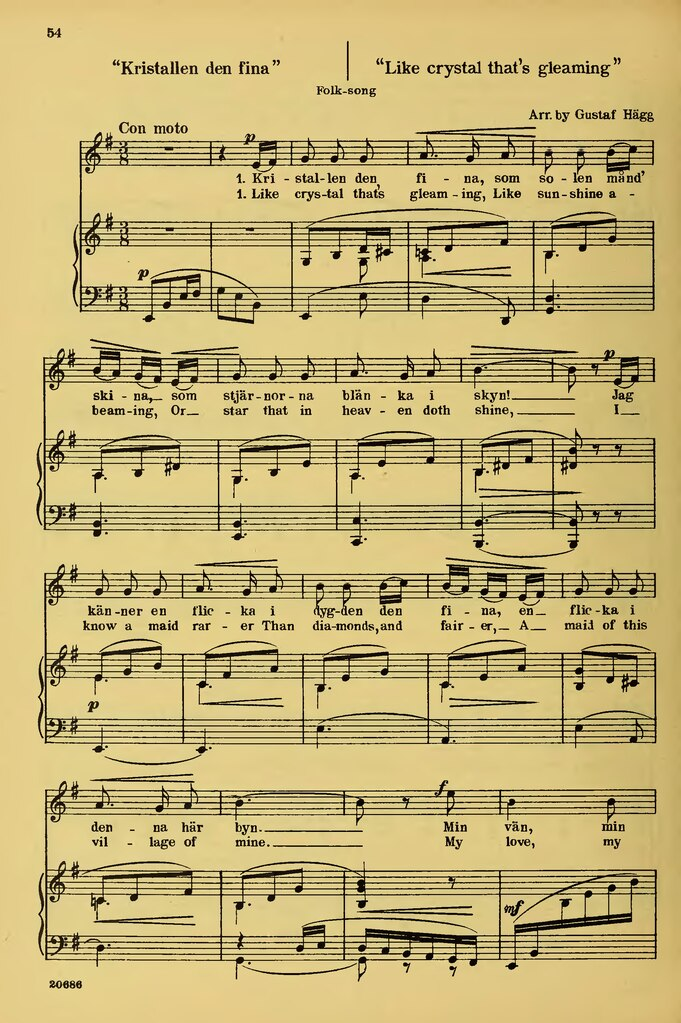

"Kristallen den fina" (English: "The fine crystal") is a traditional Swedish folk song. According to some sources, it originated in the village of Skattungbyn in the province of Dalarna. In 1843, Richard Dybeck published in Runa his version of the song recorded in Skattungbyn.

Many arrangements of the song have been written for various choral groups. One of its early arrangements for men's voices was composed by Otto Frederik Tullberg in 1840. The language of "Kristallen den fina" relies on a poetic structure, using the older, traditional language rather than contemporary Swedish. Thematically, the song reflects a sense of longing and romance between a couple.

The song is featured in the 1972 film Jag Heter Stelios (My Name is Stelios), in the scene where the main characters, Stelios and Kostas, walk through Stockholm, whereupon Kostas begins singing it.

== Arrangements ==
Numerous arrangements of the piece have been written:

- Otto Fredrik Tullberg for men's choir (1840)
- Jacob Niclas Ahlström, for piano (1878)
- Eva Toller (1959)
- Carl Paulsson for mixed voices (1944)
- Carl-Elow Nordström for three-voice mixed voices (1954)
- Camilla Liedbergius for mixed voices (1944)
- Harvester for voices, guitar, flute, bass and drums (1970)
- Erland von Koch for mixed voices or women's choir (1972)
- Berndt Egerbladh for piano and electric piano (1975)
- Gunnar Eriksson for mixed voices (1996)
- Nils Lindberg for mixed voices (1998)
- Falconer as bonus track of their album Northwind (2006)
