= Christina Lindberg =

Swedish actress

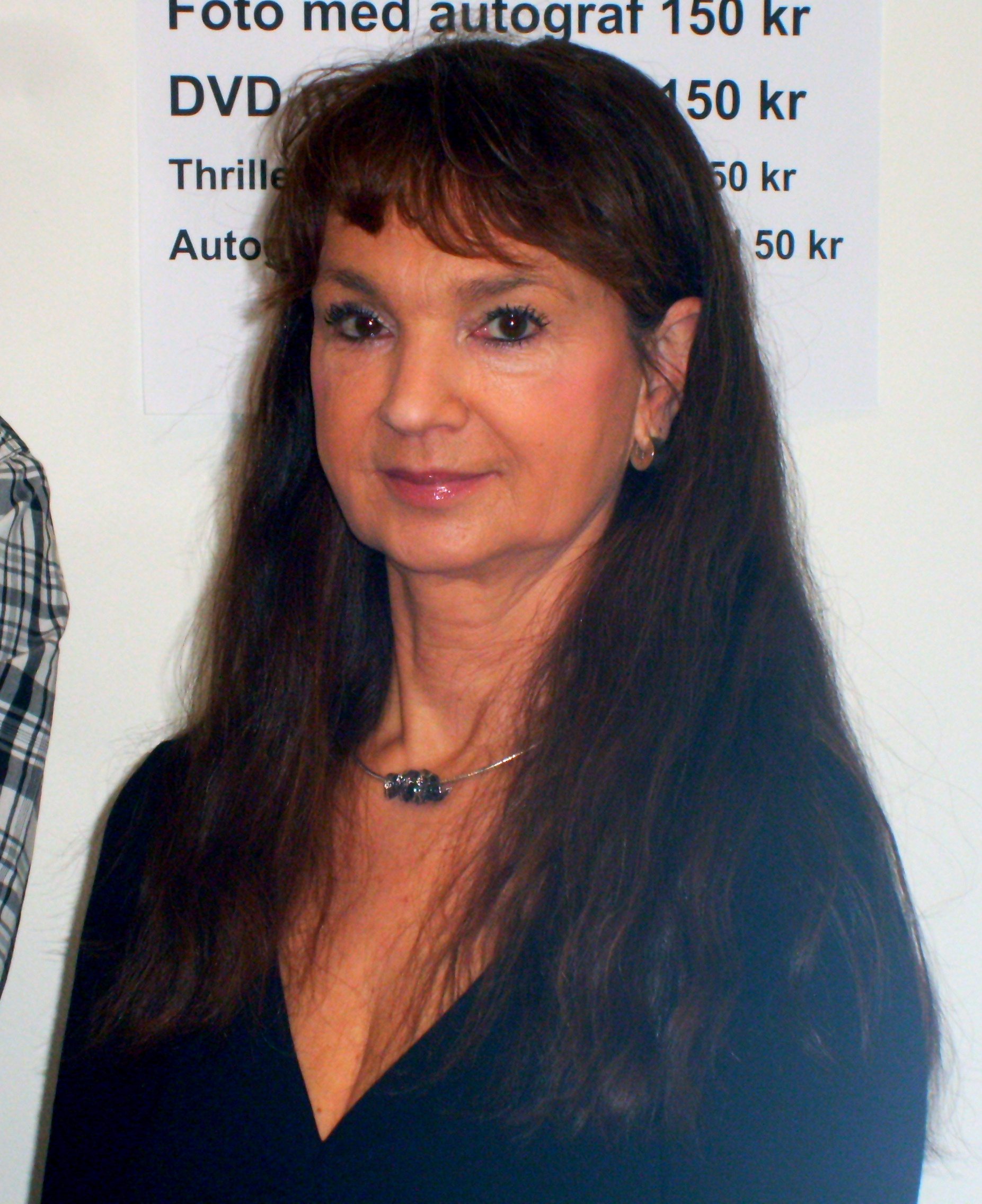
- Christina Lindberg in 2012
- Born: Britt Christina Marinette Lindberg; 6 December 1950 (age 75); Gothenburg, Sweden
- Occupations: Actress, model, journalist
- Years active: 1970–present

Britt Christina Marinette Lindberg (born 6 December 1950) is a Swedish journalist known internationally for her work as an erotic actress and glamour model in the late 1960s and early 1970s.

== Biography ==
Lindberg grew up in a working-class home in Annedal, Gothenburg, together with her sister and three brothers. She studied Latin at school, and planned to continue her studies after graduation in archaeology.

== Modeling career ==
Around 1968, in her final year of schooling (when she was 18 years old), Lindberg began posing nude for men's magazines, such as FIB aktuellt and Lektyr, after having garnered some attention posing in swimsuits for Swedish newspapers. She later appeared in prominent men's magazines, such as Penthouse (UK), Playboy (U.S.), Lui (France) and Mayfair (UK). Lindberg was "Penthouse Pet" for the June 1970 issue of Penthouse.

== Film career ==
Lindberg has appeared or starred in 26 feature films, most of which are erotica, fictional sexploitation or softcore productions. Her first appearance in an American film, Maid in Sweden (1971) was filmed with a predominantly Swedish cast in her home country. Her first role in a Swedish film was in Jan Halldoff's comedy Rötmånad (1970). The film was seen by over 250,000 Swedes, a record for the time, and went on to become a commercial success. Her third film, Exponerad (1971), was released with a lot of hype at the Cannes Film Festival that year, and turned her into an international celebrity. As part of the marketing campaign for Exponerad, Lindberg embarked on a promotional trip across Japan, which later resulted in an invitation to appear in Japanese films. There, she played a major supporting role in Norifumi Suzuki's Pink film classic Sex & Fury (1973).

A string of sexploitation films followed, many of which were filmed in Germany or Japan. In 1973, she starred as Madeleine in Bo A. Vibenius's controversial film Thriller – en grym film (1973), and was the basis for Daryl Hannah's character Elle Driver in Tarantino's Kill Bill series of films.

Lindberg did not like that nude pictures were getting more and more explicit and, during the filming of Gerard Damiano's Flossie (AKA Natalie—not to be confused with a 1974 film of the same name, which was directed by Mac Ahlberg and starred Marie Forså), in West Germany, she left the set and returned home to Sweden. Damiano (who also directed the infamous Deep Throat) persuaded Lindberg to leave because he knew that it was going to be a hardcore film. For several years, the German producer tried to bring her back, in an attempt to complete the film. According to Videooze (No. 8, 1996), about 1,000 meters of film had been shot by Damiano. Production ceased and never resumed.

After a long absence from acting, Lindberg appeared in the 2016 thriller Lindangens Park, the 2018 horror movie Svart Cirkel (directed by Adrian Garcia Bogliano) and in the 2020 sci-fi feature Pandemonic.

== Post film career ==
In her introduction to Daniel Ekeroth's book Swedish Sensationsfilms: A Clandestine History of Sex, Thrillers, and Kicker Cinema, Christina Lindberg explains that after leaving exploitation films behind, she has been busy with numerous other projects. In 1972 she met future fiancé Bo Sehlberg and later started to work for his aviation magazine Flygrevyn. When Sehlberg died in 2004, Lindberg took over ownership and the position as editor-in-chief of the magazine—which is the largest aviation magazine in Scandinavia. She has also produced an instructional video on how to pick and prepare mushrooms, Christinas Svampskola, and is very passionate about preserving the Swedish wolf. She made an attempt to enter the theater school Scenskolan in 1975 after having taken private lessons from Öllegård Wellton, but failed after having passed two out of three tests. She continued posing and writing for men's magazines while studying journalism at Poppius, and she eventually established herself as a journalist.

== Selected filmography ==
Note: The films have been listed in order of production, based on Lindberg's diary.

Year	Movie	Role	Notes
1970	Rötmånad (What Are You Doing After the Orgy?)	Anna Bella Gustafsson	Major supporting role
1971	Yusra		It's unclear whether Lindberg actually appears in this film (her scenes may have been cut)
1971	Maid in Sweden (Jena)	Inga	Starring role (credited as Kristina Lindberg); filmed entirely in English
1971	Smoke	Annie	Minor supporting role. Annie was based on the US comic strip character Little Orphan Annie.
1971	Exponerad (Exposed)	Lena Svensson	Starring role (credited as Cristina Lindberg)
1972	Swedish Wildcats (Every Afternoon)	Helga	Brief appearances
1972	Young Playthings	Gunilla	Starring role
1972	Mädchen, die nach München kommen (Sex at the Olympics)	Anja	Minor supporting role
1972	Schulmädchen-Report 4. Teil – Was Eltern oft verzweifeln lässt (Campus Swingers)	Barbara Heinbach	Minor supporting role. The American version is 20 mins. shorter, and many of Lindberg's scenes have been cut
1973	Liebe in drei Dimensionen (Love in 3-D)	Inge	Minor supporting role
1973	Was Schulmädchen verschweigen (What Schoolgirls Don't Tell)		Minor supporting role
1973	Jorden runt med Fanny Hill (Around The World With Fanny Hill)	Meatball Model	Brief appearances
1973	Furyô anego den: Inoshika Ochô (Sex & Fury)	Christina	Major supporting role
1973	Poruno no joô: Nippon sex ryokô (Journey to Japan)	Ingrid Jacobsen	Starring role
1973	Wide Open (Sängkamrater)	Eva	Minor supporting role
1973	Anita – ur en tonårsflickas dagbok (Anita: Swedish Nymphet)	Anita	Starring role. There are several versions of the film, including a US version with hardcore inserts which were shot later (Lindberg didn't participate in these scenes). The hardcore version has not been released on DVD.
1974	Thriller – en grym film (They Call Her One Eye)	Madeleine/Frigga/One Eye	Starring role
1977	91:an och Generalernas Fnatt	Bloodsample Nurse	Brief appearances
1979	There Is a Sunrise Every Morning	Cavegirl	Eco-drama/documentary
1980	Attentatet (Outrage)		Brief appearances
1980	Sverige åt svenskarna (Battle of Sweden)	French Mistress	Brief appearances
1982	One-Week Bachelors (Gräsänklingar)	Stripper (Uncredited)	Brief appearances
1993	Christinas Svampskola	(Herself)	20 min. instructional video about mushrooms
2000	Sex, lögner & videovåld (Sex, Lies & Videoviolence)	Frigga/Madeleine/One Eye (Cameo)	A non-commercial video parody of a variety of well known movies. Made by Swedish film fans working themselves in movie and entertainment business, shot in 1990–1993
