= Kärlekens XYZ =

- Directed by: Torgny Wickman
- Produced by: Inge Ivarson
- Cinematography: Lasse Björne
- Release date: 8 July 1971 (Sweden)
- Running time: 104 minutes
- Country: Sweden
- Language: Swedish
- Box office: SEK 1,611,384 (Sweden)

Kärlekens XYZ ("The XYZ of Love") is a 1971 Swedish sex educational film directed by Torgny Wickman. It is a sequel to the two films Language of Love (1969) and Mera ur kärlekens språk (1970). In 1973 the three films were edited together into a new film, Det bästa ur Kärlekens språk-filmerna ("The Best from the Language of Love Films").

== Cast ==
- Maj-Briht Bergström-Walan
- Leif Silbersky
- Inge Hegeler
- Sten Hegeler
- Joachim Israel
- Ola Ullsten
- Birgitta Linnér
- Rune Pär Olofsson
- Lars Engström
- Göran Bergstrand
- Tommy Hedlund
- Arne Mellgren
- Göran Hallberg
- Rune Hallberg
- Kim Anderzon
- Seth Nilsson
- Bent Rohweder
- Sven Olof Erikson
- Axel Segerström
