= Nothing Left to Fear (Destiny album) =

Studio album by Destiny
- Released: 1991
- Recorded: 1989
- Genre: Heavy metal
- Label: Active
- Producer: Destiny

Destiny chronology
Atomic Winter (1988)	Nothing Left to Fear (1991)	The Undiscovered Country (1998)

Professional ratings
Review scores
Source	Rating
Allmusic	4/5 stars

Nothing Left to Fear is heavy metal/ progressive rock band Destiny's third album. It was released in autumn 1991 on both vinyl and CD.

Destiny also produced their first promotional video for a track from this album, The Evil Trinity. Another two tracks from Beyond All Sense were re-recorded for this album - Sirens In The Dark and Rest in Peace.

== Track listing ==
1. ""Nothing left to fear 5.30 Music:Kindberg/Björnshög Lyrics: Gram
2. "Medieval Rendezvous" 4.52 Music: Björnshög Lyrics: Gram
3. "The Evil Trinity" 4.46 Music: Björnshög/Kindberg Lyrics: Gram
4. "Sirens In The Dark" 5.57 Music: Björnshög/Österman Lyrics: Ring
5. "Sheer Death" 4.14 Music: Björnshög Lyrics: Gram
6. "F.Ö.S. 1.50 Music: Kindberg
7. "Beyond All Sense" 4.48 Music: Björnshög/Kindberg Lyrics: Gram
8. "No Reservation” 3.51 Music: Björnshög/Kindberg Lyrics: Gram
9. "The Raven" 3.45 Muic: Kindberg Lyrics: Gram
10. "Rest In Peace" 4.39 Music: Österman/Prodén Lyrics:Ring
11. ”Gamla Du Fria” 0.57 Lyrics and music: Richard Dybeck, 1844 Trad Arr. Destiny 1990

== Lineup ==
- Vocals: Zenny Gram
- Bass: Stefan Björnshög
- Guitar: Gunnar Kindberg
- Drums: Peter Lundgren
