= Future of the Past (Destiny album) =

Studio album by Destiny
- Released: 2004
- Recorded: 2000/2002
- Genre: Heavy metal
- Label: GMR
- Producer: Destiny

Destiny chronology
The Undiscovered Country (1998)	Future of the Past (2004)	Beyond All Sense 2005 (2005)

Future of the Past is Destiny's fifth album. Released in 2004, it was the band's first album featuring former Falconer frontman Kristoffer Göbel on vocals. This album is the first one being recorded in the band's own studio DRS (later mixed at StudiOmega by Christian Silver).

== Track listing ==
Music by Stefan Björnshög and lyrics by Kristoffer Göbel for all tracks, except where noted.

1. "Holy Man" 5:08
2. "Sabotage" 4:14
3. "In The Shadow Of The Rainbow" 4:54
4. "Magic Forest" 5:34
5. "Angels" 5:29 (Music by Anders Fagerstrand)
6. "Flying Dutchman" 4:57
7. "On The Outside" 6:34
8. "Ghost Train" 4:32
9. "Future Of The Past" 8:23

== Credits ==
- Vocals: Kristoffer Göbel
- Bass: Stefan Björnshög
- Guitar: Anders Fagerstrand
- Guitar: Niclas Granath
- Guitar: Janne Ekberg
- Drums: Birger Löfman

Special Guest Musicians:

- Mats Olausson: Keyboards on Future Of The Past
- Zenny Gram: Backing Vocals on Future Of The Past
- Helena Johansson: Female Vocals on Flying Dutchman
- Fredrik Johansson: Growl Vocals, Backing Vocals on Holy Man and Backing Vocals on Future Of The Past
