= Mera ur kärlekens språk =

- Directed by: Torgny Wickman
- Screenplay by: Torgny Wickman; Inge Hegeler; Sten Hegeler
- Produced by: Inge Ivarson
- Cinematography: Lasse Björne
- Release date: 18 November 1970 (Sweden)
- Running time: 103 minutes
- Country: Sweden
- Language: Swedish
- Box office: SEK 3,749,000 (Sweden)

Mera ur kärlekens språk (aka More from the Language of Love and More about the Language of Love, also released as Language of Love 2) is a 1970 Swedish sex educational film directed by Torgny Wickman. It is a sequel to the 1969 film Language of Love and had a sequel in 1971, Kärlekens XYZ. In 1973 the three films were edited together into a new film, Det bästa ur Kärlekens språk-filmerna ("The Best from the Language of Love Films"). The film dealt more with alternative sexuality and life styles and the disabled but was equally successful financially as Language of Love.

The film was initially refused a UK cinema certificate (as per its predecessor) in 1972 by the BBFC under the title More About the Language of Love. It was eventually passed with 3 minutes of cuts for theatrical release under the title Language of Love 2 in February 1983 and again for video in 1987. It was finally passed uncut in 2009 as part of a 3 DVD set entitled Swedish Erotica.

A Swedish sex education film with the same title, directed by Anders Lennberg, was made in 2009.

== Cast ==
- Maj-Briht Bergström-Walan
- Inge Hegeler
- Sten Hegeler
- Bertil Hansson
- Johan Wallin
- Bengt Lindqvist
- Bengt Berggren
- Bruno Kaplan
- Tommy Hedlund
- Anna Berggren
- Mirjam Israel
- Ove Alström
- Göran Bergstrand
- Curt H:son Nilsson
- Lars Lennartsson
- Suzanne Hovinder
- Mogens Jacobsen
- Rune Pär Olofsson
- Annakarin Svedberg
- Wenche Willumsen
- Lars Ljungberg
- Helena Rohde
- Bent Rohweder
- Lasse Lundberg
