= Beyond All Sense 2005 =

2005 re-recording of a 1985 Destiny album

Studio album by Destiny
- Released: 2005
- Recorded: 2000/2005
- Studios: DRS (Gothenburg); StudiOmega (Varberg)
- Genre: Heavy metal
- Length: 46:17
- Label: GMR Music Group
- Producer: Destiny

Destiny chronology
Future of the Past (2004)	Beyond All Sense 2005 (2005)	Climate Change (2016)

Beyond All Sense 2005 is Destiny's sixth album, a re-recording of their 1985 album Beyond All Sense, and was released on May 11, 2005. The original album was only released in Sweden in a limited number of 2000 copies of vinyl.

Most of the music on the album was written by former Destiny guitarists Magnus Österman and John Prodén, and lyrics were largely from former Destiny singer Håkan Ring. "Lost to Heaven" (acoustic) and "Destiny" from the 1985 album were replaced by two previously unreleased bonus tracks. "Ode to You", originally written in 1983 and called "Please Don't Go", was rewritten by vocalist Kristoffer Göbel as a tribute to Dimebag Darrell after his 2004 death. The second bonus track, "No Way Out" (originally "He Is Free"), was cut from the 1985 album due to the time limit on vinyls and was rewritten by Göbel for the 2005 album. The rewritten song was about Ozzy Osbourne and reality TV shows.

== Track listing ==
Order	Title	Length	Composer	Lyrics	Notes	Ref
1	"Sacrilege"	4:30	John Prodén	Håkan Ring		
2	"Kill the Witch"	3:48	Prodén	Ring		
3	"Ode to You"	4:08	Magnus Österman, Stefan Björnshög	Kristoffer Göbel	Bonus track, dedicated to Dimebag Darrell	
4	"Spellbreaker"	4:11	Österman	Österman		
5	"Power by Birth"	4:53	Österman, Prodén	Österman		
6	"Rest in Peace"	5:12	Österman, Prodén	Ring		
7	"Madame Guillotine (Hang Them High)"	3:44	Prodén, Björnshög	Ring, Göbel		
8	"No Way Out"	4:13	Prodén, Björnshög	Göbel	Bonus track	
9	"More Evil than Evil"	4:04	Prodén	Ring		
10	"Sirens in the Dark"	7:34	Österman, Björnshög	Ring		

Disc 2 bonus tracks include a video of "In the Shadow of the Rainbow" from Future of the Past; a medley of the songs "Holy Man", "Sabotage", and "Future of the Past", with live footage from the 2005 release party in Gothenburg; review from the Future of the Past release party; quotes from reviews of the album Future of the Past; discography; bonus DVD produced by Pixel Productions; and a video of "In the Shadow of the Rainbow" by Astronaut.

== Credits ==
=== Main personnel ===
- Kristoffer Göbel - vocals, writer
- Stefan Björnshög - bass, composer
- Janne Ekberg - guitar, sound engineering
- Birger Löfman - drums

=== Additional credits ===
- Mathias Rosén - keyboard on "Power by Birth"
- Linus Wikström - harmony guitar on "Sirens in the Dark"
- Fredrik Olsson - guitar
- Janne Olsson - guitar
- Mats Olausson - keyboard on "Beyond All Sense"
- Christian Silver - mixing, sound engineering
- Dragan Tanasković - mastering
- Christer Lindblad - sound engineering
- Bengt Grönkvist - cover art
- Staffan Falkenström/Pixel Productions - 3D artwork and logo
- Conny Myrberg - photography
- Ken Olsson - photography
- Kenneth Johansson - photography
