= Borssén =

Borssén is a surname. Notable people with the surname include:

- Jarl Borssén, Swedish actor and comedian
- Therese Borssén, Swedish alpine skier
