= Future of the Past =

Future of the Past may refer to:

- Future of the Past (Destiny album), an album by Destiny
- Future of the Past (Vader album), a 1996 album by Vader
- In linguistics, futurity from a past perspective
