= Berndt Egerbladh =

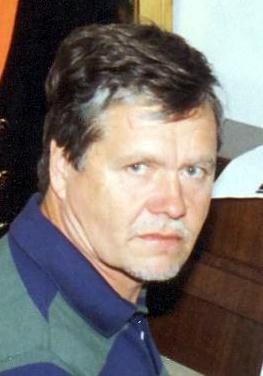
- Egerbladh in 1993

Background information
- Born: Berndt Erik Egerbladh; 1 May 1932; Sweden
- Died: 2 March 2004 (aged 71)
- Genres: Jazz, entertainment
- Instrument: Piano

Berndt Erik Egerbladh (1 May 1932 – 2 March 2004) was a Swedish jazz pianist, composer and television personality.

== Biography ==
Egerbladh was born in Transtrand. He grew up in Umeå and performed in local jazz and dance orchestras. He graduated as a teacher in 1954 and 1959, worked as such 1955–1967 and completed his education as a TV producer in 1969.

He was a producer at Swedish Radio's Channel 4 för Västerbotten 1967–1969, at Channel 2 television 1969–1985 and worked for SVT as a producer also hosting programs such as Två och en flygel (Two and a Grand Piano). He also published books, Remembering the 1940s and Remembering the 1950s, named for two TV series so titled along with one remembering the 1960s. He wrote the autobiographical "... och så tog Berndt bladet från munnen" (... and Then Berndt Spoke Out).

From 1985 he ran his own record companies "Green Records" and "Berndt Egerbladh produktion AB". Egerbladh also wrote, arranged and performed on Doris Svensson's record Did You Give the World Some Love Today Baby in 1970.

He was the son of Ossian Egerbladh and Amy Egerbladh née Johansson (1900–1964) and an uncle of Birgitta Egerbladh. Berndt Egerbladh married Gunn-Britt Gunnarsson in 1955 and had daughters Monica and Ewa.

He died in Sollentuna, Sweden.

== Discography ==
- Lasse Lystedt Quintet, Fanfar! (Jazz, 1962)
- Schizo (Swedisc, 1965) – rec. 1964
- But When I Started to Play (Nashville, 1966)
- Plays the Organ with a Swing (Nashville, 1968)
- Snövit Och Dom Sju Dvärgarna - En popmusical (RCA Victor, 1973)
- Nybyggarland (Sonet, 1973)
- Kristallen den fina (CBS, 1975) – rec. 1974
- Lena Nyman & Rune Andersson, Var mig nära (YTF, 1975)
- African Suite (Sonet, 1976)
- Ja visst gör det ont with Lena Nyman (YTF, 1976)
- As time goes by (Green, 1984)
- Live at Borgholm Strand (Green, 1985) – live
- A Boy Full of Thoughts (Beprod, 1989) – rec. 1988. reissued (Atelier Sawano, 2000).
- Night pieces (LadyBird, 1996) – rec. 1995
- Twosome (LadyBird, 1998) – rec. 1992–1996
- Mousse au Chocolat (Atelier Sawano, 2001) – rec. 2000
- Sweet & Lovely (Atelier Sawano, 2003) – rec. 2002

== Selected movie scores ==
- 1971 Exponerad
- 1973 Håll alla dörrar öppna
- 1975 A Guy and a Gal
- 1975 Pojken med guldbyxorna
- 1979 Gå på vattnet om du kan
- 1981 Peter No-Tail

== Selected television ==
- 1974–1990 - Två och en flygel
- 1989 - Jag minns mitt 40-tal
- 1988 - Jag minns mitt 50-tal
- 1993 - Jag minns mitt 60-tal

== Bibliography ==
- Egerbladh, Berndt (1991). Jag minns mitt 40-tal. Höganäs: Bra böcker.
- Egerbladh, Berndt (1992). Jag minns mitt 50-tal. Höganäs: Bra böcker. ISBN 91-7133-108-5
