= Language of Love =

Ur kärlekens språk
- Directed by: Torgny Wickman
- Screenplay by: Inge Hegeler; Sten Hegeler; Torgny Wickman
- Produced by: Inge Ivarson
- Cinematography: Max Wilén
- Edited by: Carl-Olov Skeppstedt
- Music by: Mats Olsson
- Release date: 2 October 1969 (Sweden)
- Running time: 102 minutes
- Country: Sweden
- Language: Swedish
- Budget: SEK 700,000 (estimated)
- Box office: SEK 7,083,000 (Sweden) (sub-total)

Language of Love (Swedish: Ur kärlekens språk) is a 1969 Swedish sex educational film directed by Torgny Wickman. It was an international success.

Although initially refused a cinema certificate in 1970 by the BBFC, it was passed uncut 3 years later and gained publicity when 30,000 people gathered on Trafalgar Square in London to protest against a nearby movie theatre showing it, one of the protesters being pop singer Cliff Richard. Lord Longford and Raymond Blackburn decided to pursue a matter of pornography classification for the film Language of Love into the Court of Appeal and lost the writ of mandamus against the Police Commissioner, who had refused to intrude upon the British Board of Film Classification remit.

== Controversy in U.S. ==
In the United States, the film was seized by the Regional Commissioner of Customs on 2 October 1969, and a civil action for forfeiture was begun by the United States Attorney for the Southern District of New York on 14 October. The civil action was filed under Section 305 of the Tariff Act of 1930, which allows the U.S. Government to prohibit the importation of obscene materials.

The owners of the film, Unicorn Enterprises and Swedish Film Productions, filed to have their property returned to them.

Ultimately, this first action was ended by an order of discontinuance on 18 November 1969, as the owners decided that a problem with the tape of the film's soundtrack meant that they should import another copy of the film. The defective print was returned to Sweden and a different one imported in its place, arriving on 20 November. This copy was also seized by the Commissioner on 4 December, and the United States Attorney filed another civil action for forfeiture. As before, Unicorn Enterprises and Swedish Film Productions filed to have their property returned to them.

Despite their claims that having the film seized caused them significant revenue loss, Judge Milton Pollack found that there were enough questions about the film to allow the case to proceed.

Judge Pollack and an advisory jury applied the three-part obscenity test from the 1966 Memoirs v. Massachusetts decision, finding that the film was an appeal to prurient interest, an offensive affront to contemporary community standards, and utterly without redeeming social importance and value. Having found that all three criteria of the Memoirs test were met, the judge found it to be obscene.

By this point, attorney Ephraim London had joined the case and appealed to the Second Circuit Court of Appeals. In September 1970, the circuit court reversed the lower court's decision, finding that the film, although explicit, did not appeal to prurient interest and had some redeeming value as an educational film, failing to meet the criteria from Memoirs.

While the Justice Department initially appealed the Second Circuit's decision to the U.S. Supreme Court in February 1971, the appeal was withdrawn that June, as the department did not think its case would prevail.

Following such events, it was marketed as a sexploitation film of the "white coater" variety in some places – a pornographic film masquerading as a documentary or scientific film.

== Sequels and remakes ==
The film had two sequels, Mera ur kärlekens språk in 1970 and Kärlekens XYZ in 1971. In 1973 the three films were edited together into a new film, Det bästa ur Kärlekens språk-filmerna (The Best from the Language of Love Films).

Mera ur kärlekens språk (More from the Language of Love) had equal box office success but it dealt more with alternative sexuality and lifestyles and also with disabled people.

Remakes of the first two films appeared in 2004 (Kärlekens språk a.k.a. Kärlekens språk 2000) and in 2009 (Mera ur kärlekens språk), both directed by Anders Lennberg.

The film included split screen visions of couples having sex with Ravel's Bolero playing in the background.

== Cast ==
- Inge Hegeler
- Sten Hegeler
- Maj-Briht Bergström-Walan
- Sture Cullhed
- Barbro Hiort af Ornäs
- Stig Johanson
- Göthe Grefbo
- Gösta Krantz
- Julie Bernby
- Börje Nyberg
- Lennart Lindberg
- Margaretha Henriksson
- Conny Ling
