= The Sceptre of Deception =

Studio album by Falconer
- Released: 4 September 2003
- Recorded: May–June 2003
- Studios: Los Angered Recording Studio, Gothenburg
- Genre: Power metal
- Length: 49:07
- Label: Metal Blade Records
- Producers: Andy LaRoque and Falconer

Falconer chronology
Chapters from a Vale Forlorn (2002)	The Sceptre of Deception (2003)	Grime vs. Grandeur (2005)

Professional ratings
Review scores
Source	Rating
AllMusic	1.5/5 stars
AllMusic	4/6 stars

The Sceptre of Deception is the third album by Swedish power metal band Falconer, the first with vocalist Kristoffer Göbel and also the first to feature a full band line-up. The album covers events during the reign of King Birger of Sweden and lengthy strife between him, his brothers, and the Danish and Norwegian crowns.

== Track listing ==
All songs written by Stefan Weinerhall.

No.	Title	Length
1.	"The Coronation"	4:38
2.	"The Trail of Flames"	5:22
3.	"Under the Sword"	3:44
4.	"Night of Infamy"	6:00
5.	"Hooves Over Northland"	4:09
6.	"Pledge for Freedom"	3:50
7.	"Ravenhair"	5:04
8.	"The Sceptre of Deception"	8:00
9.	"Hear Me Pray"	3:00
10.	"Child of Innocence"	0:57
11.	"The Gate"	4:23

There is bonus track on the Japanese version of the album called "The Gate". This songs is unrelated to the concept of the album.

== Credits ==
- Kristoffer Göbel – Vocals
- Stefan Weinerhall – Guitar
- Anders Johansson – Guitar
- Peder Johansson – Bass
- Karsten Larsson – Drums

=== Guests ===
- Johannes Nyberg – Keyboards & Backing Vocals
- Mathias Blad – Backing & Additional Vocals
- Nicklas Olsson – backing & additional lead vocals; last guitar lead on "The Sceptre Of Deception"
- Elina Ryd – Backing Vocals
- Elize Ryd – Backing Vocals
- Fredik Jonsson – Backing Vocals
- Thomas Sjölander – Backing Vocals
- Andy La Rocque – Lead Guitar on "Hear Me Pray"

Produced by Falconer & Andy La Rocque. Engineered by A. La Rocque at "Los Angered".
