= Grime vs. Grandeur =

Studio album by Falconer
- Released: 5 May 2005
- Recorded: December 2004
- Studio: Los Angered Recording Studio, Gothenburg
- Genre: Power metal
- Length: 52:49
- Label: Metal Blade Records
- Producer: Falconer

Falconer chronology
The Sceptre of Deception (2003)	Grime vs. Grandeur (2005)	Northwind (2006)

Professional ratings
Review scores
Source	Rating
AllMusic	3.5/5 stars

Grime vs. Grandeur is the fourth album by Swedish power metal band Falconer, and the last to feature vocalist Kristoffer Göbel.

== Track listing ==
All songs written by Stefan Weinerhall.

No.	Title	Length
1.	"Emotional Skies"	5:11
2.	"Purgatory Time"	4:44
3.	"I Refuse"	4:35
4.	"Humanity Overdose"	6:16
5.	"The Assailant"	3:43
6.	"Power"	6:05
7.	"No Tears for Strangers"	5:48
8.	"The Return"	5:09
9.	"Jack the Knife"	4:23
10.	"Child of the Wild"	6:55

== Credits ==
- Kristoffer Göbel – vocals
- Stefan Weinerhall – guitar
- Jimmy Hedlund – guitar
- Magnus Linhardt – bass
- Karsten Larsson – drums

== Album notes ==
- The digipack version features the bonus track Wake Up, which features Andy LaRocque as co-lead vocalist.
- In Japan the bonus track is Rock 'n' Roll Devil.
- Snowy Shaw, who did the photography for the album booklet, plays drums on track 3.
- Elize Ryd, who did the backing vocals in the band's previous album, The Sceptre of Deception, did backing vocals in some songs from this album, most notably track 1.
