= Heed (band) =

Swedish heavy metal band

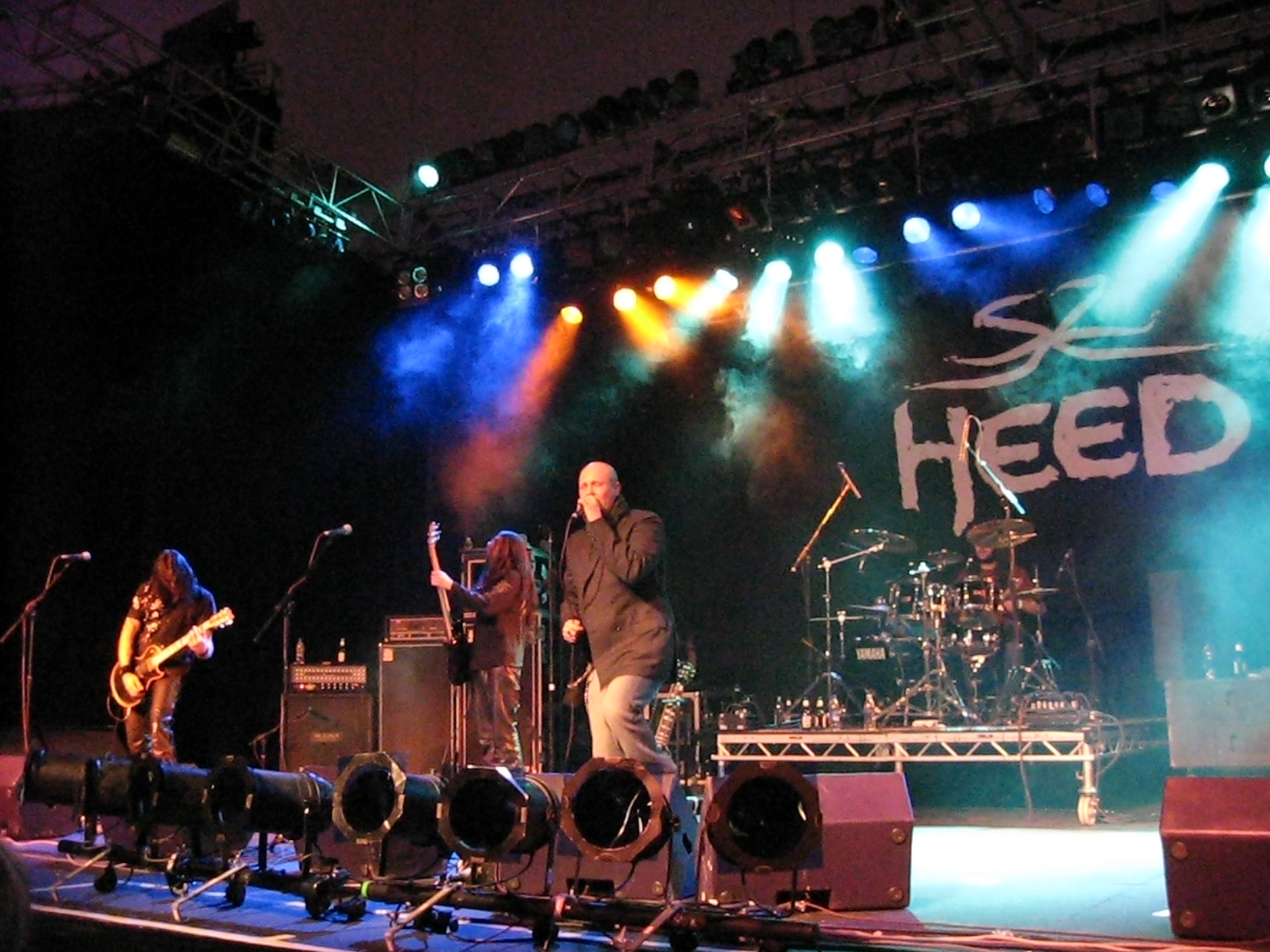
- Heed on stage at ProgpowerUK 2, Cheltenham, England, 2007

Background information
- Origin: Gothenburg, Sweden
- Genres: Heavy metal
- Years active: 2004–2008
- Members: Daniel Heiman; Fredrik Olsson; Martin Andersson; Tommy Larsson; Ufuk Demir
- Website: heedonline.com

Heed was a Swedish heavy metal band founded in 2004 by ex-Lost Horizon members Daniel Heiman (vocals) and Fredrik Olsson (guitar). They were joined by drummer Mats Karlsson and bass player Jörgen Olsson, and began recording on their debut album The Call. It was released in Japan on October 21, 2005 and in Europe on 14 June 2006.

When The Call was completed, Jörgen and Mats left Heed because their musical visions and goals collided with those of the founding members. Fredrik and Daniel started looking for new members and soon found Tommy Larsson (bass) and Ufuk Demir (drums). They also added a second guitarist, Martin Andersson.

== Band members ==
- Daniel Heiman – vocals
- Fredrik Olsson – guitars
- Martin Andersson – guitars
- Tommy Larsson – bass
- Ufuk Demir – drums

=== Former members ===
- Jörgen Olsson – bass
- Mats Karlsson – drums

== Discography ==
- The Call (2006)
