= Bert-Åke Varg =

Swedish actor and singer (1932–2022)

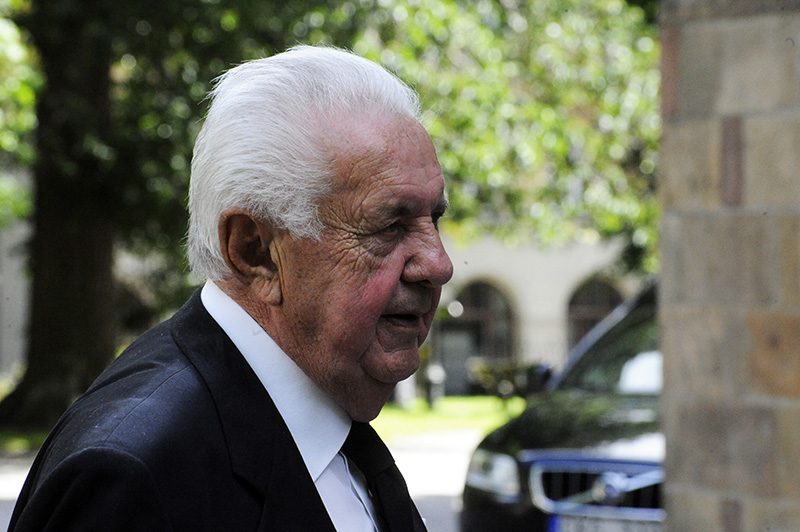
- Varg in 2015
- Born: Bert Åke Lundström; 27 April 1932; Hörnefors, Sweden
- Died: 31 December 2022 (aged 90); Stockholm, Sweden
- Occupations: Actor, singer
- Years active: 1953–2022
- Spouses: Annette (m. 1960; died 1993) Julianna (m. 1997)
- Children: 3

Bert-Åke Varg (né Lundström, 27 April 1932 – 31 December 2022) was a Swedish actor and singer.

== Life and career ==
Varg was born in Hörnefors and received his theatrical training at the Calle Flygare Theatre School in Stockholm. In 1956 he had his breakthrough as a recording artist with Kökspolkan (1956). He showed versatility from the start, learning tap dancing in 16 days after being called in to replace Nils Poppe in the Swedish version of the musical Me and My Girl in the late 1950s.

Varg performed in numerous revues. He also dubbed a large number of roles; his voice is well known in Sweden from the Swedish versions of Fabeltjeskrant, The Jungle Book, SuperTed, and the Tintin and Asterix animated productions. In Tintin productions he sometimes voiced the butler, Nestor, sometimes the detectives Dupont and Dupond (Thomson and Thompson in English versions). In the 1970s, as the owl Helge, he had a lead role alongside Birgitta Andersson in the children's TV series Från A till Ö. He also appeared in cabaret, in the 1990s revival of the comedy television series Pratmakarna, and for a short time in the 1970s was a member of the Stockholm City Theatre.

In the 1970s he starred with Eva Bysing in the TV series Fint som snus (1973) och (1977). He also played the painter Fabian in Gideon Wahlberg's 1978 TV comedy Grabbarna i 57:an. He also played the director Firmin in 100 performances during the long-running production of The Phantom of the Opera at the Oscarsteatern in Stockholm in 1989–1995, where his ability to sing an operatic part without training raised some eyebrows. In the 1990s he became known to a younger generation for ten years playing the machinist Gustav Sjögren in the television series Rederiet; Gösta Prüzelius, who starred as Reidar Dahlén, was a close friend of his.

== Personal life and death ==
In 1960 he married Annette Varg; after her death in 1993, he married Julianna Varg (born 1947). He had three children.

Varg died whilst on his way to a new years concert on 31 December 2022, at the age of 90 due to a heart ailment.

== Selected filmography ==
- 1953 – Alla tiders 91 Karlsson
- 1954 – Östermans testamente
- 1965 – Serverat, Ers Majestät (TV)
- 1966 – Träfracken
- 1967 – Asterix och hans tappra galler (voice)
- 1967 – Gumman som blev liten som en tesked (Christmas TV series based on Mrs. Pepperpot)
- 1967 – Lorden från gränden (TV version)
- 1967 – Nummer i kön (TV)
- 1968 – Åsa-Nisse och den stora kalabaliken
- 1968 – Asterix och Kleopatra (voice)
- 1969 – Eva - den utstötta
- 1969 – Åsa-Nisse i rekordform
- 1969 – Mumintrollet (TV series)
- 1970 – Aristocats (voice)
- 1970 – Som hon bäddar får han ligga
- 1971 – Exponerad
- 1972 – Firmafesten
- 1972 – Ett resande teatersällskap (TV series)
- 1973 – Bröllopet
- 1973 – Stenansiktet
- 1974 – Dunderklumpen! (voice: talking house)
- 1974 – Från A till Ö (TV series)
- 1976 – Asterix 12 stordåd (voice)
- 1976 - Agaton Sax and the Byköpings Village Festival
- 1978 – Grabbarna i 57:an eller Musikaliska gänget (TV series)
- 1980 – Och skeppets namn var Gigantic (TV)
- 1980 – Spela Allan
- 1980 – Sverige åt svenskarna
- 1981 – Olsson per sekund eller Det finns ingen anledning till oro
- 1982 – SuperTed (TV series) (voice)
- 1982 – Snövit och de sju dvärgarna (voice, redubbed version)
- 1983 – Musse Piggs julsaga (voice, original dubbed version)
- 1984 – Julstrul med Staffan och Bengt (Christmas TV series)
- 1986 – Asterix och britterna (voice)
- 1986 – Hövdingen (TV series)
- 1986 – Sandybell (voice)
- 1987 – Fint som snus (TV)
- 1988 – Guld! (TV series)
- 1988 – Pippi Långstrump – starkast i världen (voice)
- 1989 – Asterix – bautastenssmällen (voice)
- 1988 – Liv i luckan med julkalendern (Christmas TV series)
- 1991 – Infödingen
- 1992–2002 – Rederiet (TV series)
- 1992 – Tom & Jerry gör stan osäker (voice)
- 1994 – Svanprinsessan (voice)
- 2004 – Kärlekens språk
- 2011 – Trassel (voice)
