= A Flame to the Ground Beneath =

Studio album by Lost Horizon
- Released: 13 February 2002
- Genre: Power metal
- Length: 52:35
- Label: Music For Nations
- Producer: Wojtek Lisicki & Lost Horizon

Lost Horizon chronology
Awakening the World (2001)	A Flame to the Ground Beneath (2002)

Professional ratings
Review scores
Source	Rating
Sputnikmusic	4.5/5 stars
About.com	3/5 stars
Metal Crypt	5/5 stars
Metal Storm	10/10 stars

A Flame to the Ground Beneath is the second and final studio album by the Swedish power metal band Lost Horizon, released in 2002.

In 2017, Loudwire ranked it as the 7th best power metal album of all time.

== Track listing ==
All tracks are written by Wojtek Lisicki, except where noted.

No.	Title	Length
1.	"Transdimensional Revelation" (Lisicki, Christian Nyquist)	2:14
2.	"Pure"	6:25
3.	"Lost in the Depths of Me"	8:45
4.	"Again Will the Fire Burn"	4:08
5.	"The Song of Earth" (Lisicki, Nyquist)	1:20
6.	"Cry of a Restless Soul"	8:22
7.	"Think Not Forever" (Lisicki, Martin Furängen)	5:58
8.	"Highlander (The One)"	11:56
9.	"Deliverance" (Lisicki, Nyquist)	3:27
Total length:		52:35

== Personnel ==
- Ethereal Magnanimus (Daniel Heiman) - vocals
- Transcendental Protagonist (Wojtek Lisicki) - guitars
- Cosmic Antagonist (Martin Furängen) - bass
- Preternatural Transmogrifyer (Christian Nyquist) - drums
- Perspicacious Protector (Attila Publik) - keyboards
- Equilibrian Epicurius (Fredrik Olsson) - guitars
