= Maj-Briht Bergström-Walan =

Swedish psychologist and sexologist (1924–2014)

- Born: Sonja Maj-Britt Linnéa Bergström; 17 November 1924; Stockholm, Sweden
- Died: 25 August 2014 (aged 89)
- Occupations: Psychologist, sexologist

Maj-Briht Bergström-Walan (17 November 1924 – 25 August 2014) was a Swedish psychologist and midwife, as well as the first authorised sexologist in Sweden.

== Education and career ==
Maj-Briht Bergström-Walan studied as a midwife in the mid-1940s and obtained her license in 1947. In 1963, she obtained her licentiate in philosophy with specialisation in clinical psychology. She also held a Master of Philosophy in the study of the history of literature and Nordic languages. She also trained as a missionary with the Mission Covenant Church of Sweden.

Between 1958 and 1972, Bergström-Walan worked as a sex educator at the Stockholm School Board and at the National Swedish Board of Education (Skolöverstyrelsen) (predecessor to the present-day Swedish National Agency for Education). In the 1960s and the 1970s, she was the leading personality in sex education in Sweden.

In 1970, Bergström-Walan founded the Swedish Sexual Research Institute which has among other things researched transvestism.

Bergström-Walan has written several books; most notably Den svenska kvinnorapporten: kvinnor i Sverige berättar om sitt sexliv ("The Swedish women's report: women in Sweden talk about their sex life"; co-authored with Helle Høpfner Nielsen), Din bok om kärlek och sex ("Your book on love and sex") and Förbjudna drömmar ("Forbidden dreams"; co-authored with Malena Ivarsson) She has also written columns in Expressen, Kamratposten, Mitt Livs Novell and Private Magazine.

On 31 May 1996, Bergström-Walan received an honorary doctorate from the Faculty of Medicine at Uppsala University, Sweden

She received the 1997 Magnus Hirschfeld Medal.

== Personal life ==
Bergström-Walan was married to church historian Bror Walan between 1949 and 1972, and she has one son, Gustav (born 1952), from that marriage. She then started to cohabit with the Danish-born psychologist Helle Høpfner Nielsen; 1929–2013) from 1976, and were then married from 2007 until the latter's death in 2013.

== Filmography ==
- 1969 – Ur kärlekens språk
- 1970 – Mera ur kärlekens språk
- 1971 – Kärlekens XYZ
- 2004 – Kärlekens språk
