= Rötmånad =

- DVD cover
- Directed by: Jan Halldoff
- Written by: Bengt Forslund; Lars Forssell
- Produced by: Bengt Forslund; Olle Nordemar
- Starring: Carl-Gustaf Lindstedt; Ulla Sjöblom; Christina Lindberg
- Distributed by: Svensk Filmindustri
- Release date: 1970
- Running time: 100 minutes
- Country: Sweden
- Language: Swedish

Rötmånad (literally "red month", American title: Dog Days, British title: What Are You Doing After the Orgy?) is a Swedish dark comedy film from 1970 directed by Jan Halldoff.

== Plot ==
In the Stockholm archipelago lives the barber Assar Gustafsson (played by Carl-Gustaf Lindstedt) peacefully with his 17-year-old daughter Anna-Bella (played by Christina Lindberg). One day Assar's wife Sally (Ulla Sjöblom) comes back after five years of absence and she starts up a brothel with the young girl as the main attraction.

== Cast ==
- Carl-Gustaf Lindstedt ... Assar Gustafsson
- Ulla Sjöblom ... Sally Gustafsson
- Christina Lindberg ... Anna Bella Gustafsson
- Ernst Günther... Jansson
- Eddie Axberg ... Jan
- Jan Blomberg ... Photographer

== Production ==
Rötmånad is Christina Lindberg's first role in a film.

== Reception ==
The film contains a lot of nudity and violence, but also a lot of humor, and has achieved cult film status in Sweden. In 2014, Svensk Filmindustri released it on DVD as part of Fyra klassiska filmer av Jan Halldoff box set.
