= Sonja Lund =

Swedish actress and dancer (born 1942)

Sonja Lund (born 29 March 1942) is a Swedish actress and dancer. After working as a professional dancer for about ten years, she began her acting career at Wasa Theatre in Vaasa, Finland, where she lived for two years. She is the mother of actress Regina Lund.
