= From a Dying Ember =

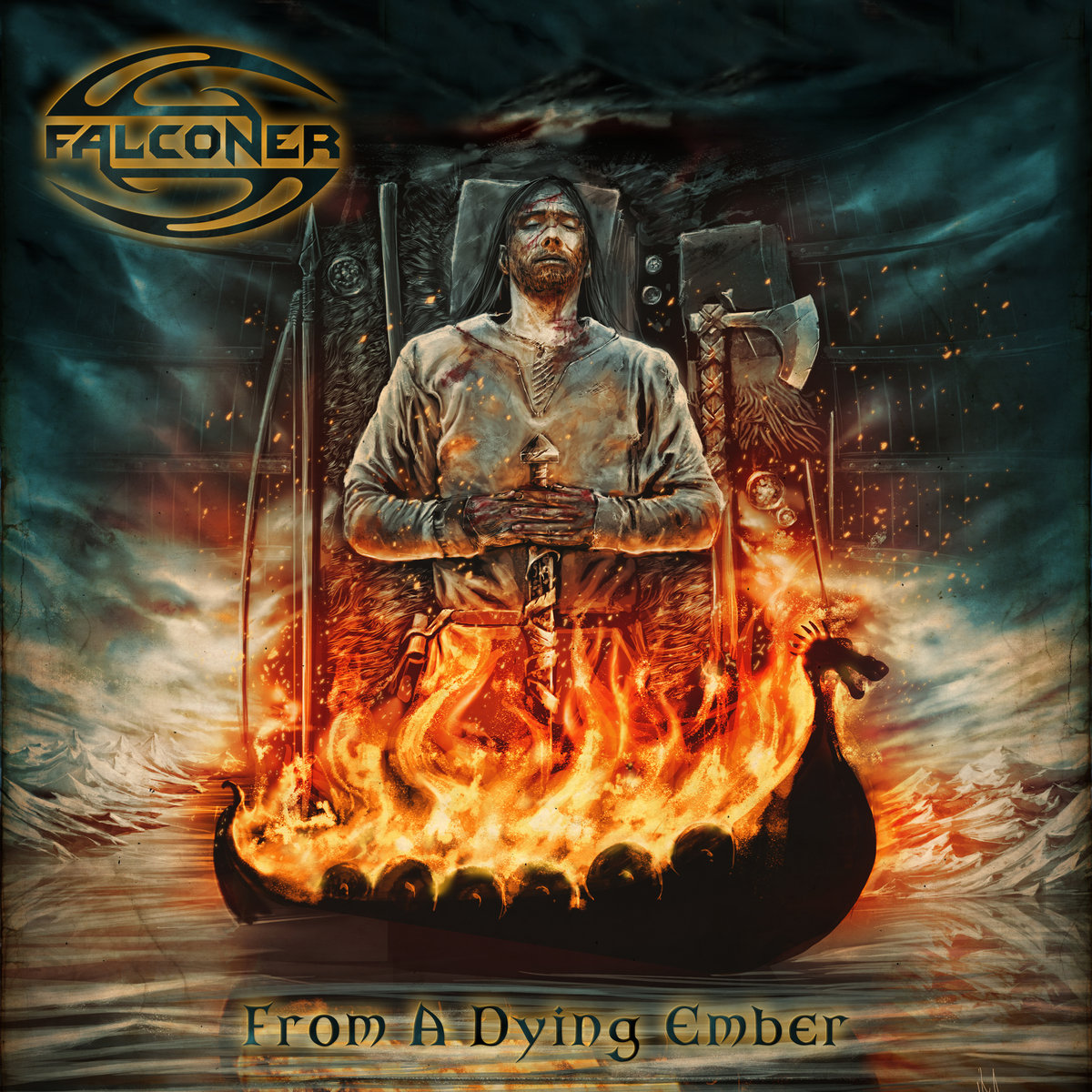

Studio album by Falconer
- Released: 26 June 2020
- Recorded: February 2020 at the Sonic Train Studios, Varberg
- Genre: Power metal, folk metal
- Length: 46:21
- Label: Metal Blade Records

Falconer chronology
Black Moon Rising (2014)	From a Dying Ember (2020)

Professional ratings
Review scores
Source	Rating
Ave Noctum	9/10
Distorted Sound	8/10
Dead Rhetoric	9.5/10

From a Dying Ember is the ninth and final studio album by Swedish power metal band Falconer, released on 26 June 2020 through Metal Blade Records. The track listing was revealed and the album went up for order on 13 May 2020.

== Track listing ==
No.	Title	Length
1.	"Kings and Queens"	4:40
2.	"Desert Dreams"	3:59
3.	"Redeem and Repent"	4:22
4.	"Bland Sump Och Dy"	3:14
5.	"Fool's Crusade"	5:25
6.	"Garnets and a Gilded Rose" (instrumental)	2:32
7.	"In Regal Attire"	3:53
8.	"Rejoice the Adorned"	3:41
9.	"Testify"	4:18
10.	"Thrust the Dagger Deep"	3:40
11.	"Rapture"	6:37

Digipak bonus tracks
No.	Title	Length
12.	"The Cauldron" (instrumental)	2:50
13.	"Portals of Light" (acoustic version)	3:37
14.	"Long Gone By" (acoustic version)	3:47
15.	"Fool's Crusade" (demo version, also in Japanese edition)	4:34
