= Lost Horizon (band) =

Swedish power metal band

- Origin: Gothenburg, Sweden
- Genres: Power metal
- Years active: 1999–2005, 2009
- Members: Wojtek Lisicki; Martin Furängen; Christian Nyquist; Attila Publik

Lost Horizon is a Swedish power metal band from Gothenburg. It comprises Daniel Heiman, Christian Nyquist, Wojtek Lisicki, and Martin Furängen.

The band has esoteric stage personas similar to sword and sorcery fantasy, with the members wearing studded leather, cloaks and face paint. In their albums' liner notes, their stage names and roles are exaggerated to sound mystical and otherworldly in nature; for example, guitarist and lyricist Wojtek Lisicki is credited as the "Earthshape" of the "Transcendental Protagonist" and credited for "Poesy of Spiritual Enlightenment/String Romanticism", with his proper roles given as a "Translation For Mortals".

== History ==
Lost Horizon originated from the band Highlander, formed in 1990 with future HammerFall member Joacim Cans on vocals. The band went on hiatus from 1994 to 1999. Then the band reformed as Lost Horizon with vocalist Daniel Heiman. Lost Horizon released their first studio album Awakening the World in 2001.

In 2002, the band gained two new members: second guitarist Fredrik Olsson and keyboardist Attila Publik. The new lineup released A Flame to the Ground Beneath in 2002. Heiman and Olsson left Lost Horizon two years later, putting the band on hiatus. Their official website released three instrumental demos ("Wizard", "Spirit" and "Fire") in 2009, but no new musical activities have been announced since then.

== Band members ==
- Transcendental Protagonist (Wojtek Lisicki) – guitars (Luciferion, Against The Plagues)
- Cosmic Antagonist (Martin Furängen) – bass (Luciferion)
- Preternatural Transmogrifyer (Christian Nyquist) – drums
- Perspicacious Protector (Attila Publik) – keyboards
- Ethereal Magnanimus (Daniel Heiman) – vocals (ex-Fierce Conviction, ex-Crystal Eyes, ex-Destiny (Swe), Heed)
- Equilibrian Epicurius (Fredrik Olsson) – guitars (ex-Destiny (Swe), Heed)

== Discography ==
Studio albums

- 2001: Awakening the World
- 2002: A Flame to the Ground Beneath

== See also ==
- Heed, formed in 2004 by ex-Lost Horizon members Daniel Heiman (vocals) and Fredrik Olsson (guitar)
