= Awakening the World =

Studio album by Lost Horizon
- Released: 8 May 2001
- Genre: Power metal
- Length: 42:37
- Label: Kosh

Lost Horizon chronology
| Awakening the World (2001) | A Flame to the Ground Beneath (2002) |

Professional ratings
Review scores
| Source | Rating |
|---|---|
| AllMusic | 1.5/5 stars |
| About.com | 3/5 stars |
| Sputnikmusic | 5/5 stars |
| Metal Storm | 10/10 stars |
| Metal Temple | 8/10 stars |
| Sea of Tranquility | 3/5 stars |
| The Metal Crypt | 4/5 stars |

Awakening the World is the debut album of the heavy metal band Lost Horizon, released in 2001.

In 2025, Graham Hartmann of Metal Injection included the album in his list of "10 Extremely Underrated Metal Albums From The 2000s".

== Track listing ==
All tracks are written by Wojtek Lisicki, except where noted.

| No. | Title | Writer(s) | Length |
|---|---|---|---|
| 1. | "The Quickening" | | 1:06 |
| 2. | "Heart of Storm" | | 6:14 |
| 3. | "Sworn in the Metal Wind" | | 5:43 |
| 4. | "The Song of Air" | | 0:59 |
| 5. | "World Through My Fateless Eyes" | | 5:06 |
| 6. | "Perfect Warrior" | | 3:55 |
| 7. | "Denial of Fate" | | 3:37 |
| 8. | "Welcome Back" | Wojtek Lisicki, Baskim Zuta | 5:39 |
| 9. | "The Kingdom of My Will" | | 9:13 |
| 10. | "The Redintegration" | | 1:42 |
| Total length: | | | 43:14 |

== Personnel ==
- Transcendental Protagonist (Wojtek Lisicki) - guitars
- Cosmic Antagonist (Martin Furängen) - bass
- Preternatural Transmogrifyer (Christian Nyquist) - drums
- Ethereal Magnanimus (Daniel Heiman) - vocals
