= Northwind (album) =

Studio album by Falconer
- Released: 22 September 2006
- Recorded: February – July 2006, at Los Angered Recording Studio, Gothenburg
- Genre: Power metal
- Length: 54:14
- Label: Metal Blade Records
- Producer: Falconer, Andy LaRocque

Falconer chronology
Grime vs. Grandeur (2005)	Northwind (2006)	Among Beggars and Thieves (2008)

Northwind is the fifth album by Swedish power metal band Falconer, the first to feature returning vocalist Mathias Blad since Chapters from a Vale Forlorn.

== Track listing ==
No.	Title	Length
1.	"Northwind"	4:15
2.	"Waltz with the Dead"	3:49
3.	"Spirit of the Hawk"	3:39
4.	"Legend and the Lore"	3:25
5.	"Catch the Shadows"	4:29
6.	"Tower of the Queen"	4:22
7.	"Long Gone By"	3:50
8.	"Perjury and Sanctity"	4:20
9.	"Fairyland Fanfare"	3:23
10.	"Himmel så trind"	3:11
11.	"Blinded"	4:20
12.	"Delusion"	5:05
13.	"Home of the Knave"	4:11
14.	"Black Tarn" (instrumental)	1:55

"Child of the Wild" was originally included on "Grime vs. Grandeur", but was re-recorded as a bonus track with Mathias Blad on lead vocals.

=== Digipack bonus CD ===
1. "Kristallen den Fina"
2. "Ridom, Ridom"
3. "Liten Vätte"
4. "Vårvindar Friska"

Also features a video documentary of the recording

== Credits ==
- Mathias Blad – vocals
- Stefan Weinerhall – rhythm and lead guitars, keyboards, mandolin
- Jimmy Hedlund – lead guitar
- Magnus Linhardt – bass
- Karsten Larsson – drums

=== Guest musician ===
- Johannes Nyberg – piano, harpsichord
