= Torgny Wickman =

Swedish screenwriter and film director

- Born: 22 April 1911; Lund, Sweden
- Died: 23 September 1997 (aged 86); Katrineholm, Sweden
- Occupations: Director, Writer
- Years active: 1954–1977 (film)

Torgny Wickman (1911–1997) was a Swedish screenwriter and film director.

== Selected filmography ==
- A Night at Glimmingehus (1954)
- Language of Love (1969)
- Eva: Diary of a Half Virgin (1969)
- The Lustful Vicar (1970)
- Sensuous Sorceress (1970)
- Mera ur kärlekens språk (1970)
- Kärlekens XYZ (1971)
- Anita: Swedish Nymphet (1973)
- The Intruders (1974)

== Bibliography ==
- Jack Stevenson. Scandinavian Blue: The Erotic Cinema of Sweden and Denmark in the 1960s and 1970s. McFarland, 2010.
