= Ulla Sjöblom =

Swedish actress

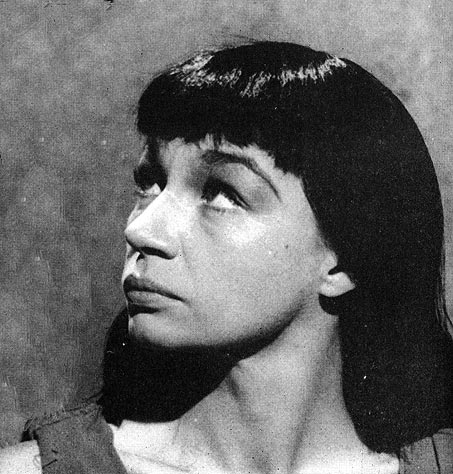
- Sjöblom in Antigone (1960)
- Born: 11 May 1927; Stockholm, Sweden
- Died: 3 August 1989 (aged 62)
- Occupation: Actress
- Years active: 1952-1988

Ulla Sjöblom (11 May 1927 – 3 August 1989) was a Swedish film actress. She appeared in 50 films between 1952 and 1988.

== Selected filmography ==
- House of Women (1953)
- Karin Månsdotter (1954)
- Simon the Sinner (1954)
- Our Father and the Gypsy (1954)
- The People of Hemsö (1955)
- Wild Birds (1955)
- My Passionate Longing (1956)
- The Magician (1958)
- Here Is Your Life (1966)
- The Bookseller Gave Up Bathing (1969)
- Rötmånad (1970)
- Gangsterfilmen (1974)
- Flight of the Eagle (1982)
- Åke and His World (1984)
