= Jarl Borssén =

Swedish actor and comedian

- Born: Jarl Anders Lennart Borssén; 14 March 1937; Berghem, Sweden
- Died: 21 December 2012 (aged 75); Munka-Ljungby, Sweden
- Occupations: Actor, comedian
- Years active: 1966–2012
- Spouse: Birgitta Andersson (m. 1975)
- Children: Jonas Borssén, Oscar Borssén

Jarl Anders Lennart Borssén (14 March 1937 – 21 December 2012) was a Swedish actor and comedian.

Born in Berghem, Mark Municipality, Borssén had his first engagement in the Kar de Mumma revue at Folkan in 1966. He appeared in the TV series Partaj in 1969. In 1976 he went to Hagge Geigert's revue in Gothenburg where he stayed until 1979. Han gained more widespread popularity with his appearances in the TV program Gäster med gester in the 1980s.

== Filmography ==
- 1968: Jag älskar, du älskar as Renting Swindler
- 1968: Fanny Hill as Engelsmannen
- 1969: Pippi Longstocking (TV Series) as Butiksassistent i järnhandeln (uncredited)
- 1970: Pippi in the South Seas as Blod-Svente
- 1970: The Lustful Vicar as The Vicar
- 1970: Som hon bäddar får han ligga as The Plumber
- 1973: Håll alla dörrar öppna as Bus Driver
- 1977: 91:an och generalernas fnatt
- 1978: The Adventures of Picasso as Guggenheim (uncredited)
- 1979: Katitzi (TV Series) as Travelling Funfair Stand Owner
- 1980: Sverige åt svenskarna as The myopic
- 1982: Jönssonligan och Dynamit-Harry as Nattvakten
- 1986: Jönssonligan dyker upp igen as Kines
- 1988: Enkel resa as Emanuele
- 1995–1998: Svenska hjärtan (TV Series) as Harald
