= The Lustful Vicar =

1970 film

- Swedish DVD-cover.
- Directed by: Torgny Wickman
- Written by: Bengt Anderberg; Inge Ivarson; Torgny Wickman
- Produced by: Inge Ivarson
- Starring: Jarl Borssén
- Cinematography: Lasse Björne
- Edited by: Carl-Olov Skeppstedt
- Release date: 30 March 1970 (Sweden)
- Running time: 90 minutes
- Country: Sweden
- Language: Swedish

The Lustful Vicar (Swedish: Kyrkoherden) is a 1970 Swedish comedy film directed by Torgny Wickman and starring Jarl Borssén. It was released to cinemas in Sweden on 30 March 1970.

A witch's daughter takes revenge on a vicar and puts a spell on him so that he suffers constant erection just as he arrives in a rural community as a man of the cloth in the early 1800s. The vicar is one of the few men in the village, most men in the village having been conscripted into wartime service. Many lonely women in the village want to help the vicar with his problem.

== Cast ==
- Jarl Borssén – The vicar
- Margit Carlqvist – Mother Sibyll
- Magali Noël – Countess
- Diana Kjær – Sanna
- Solveig Andersson – Anita
- John Elfström – Parish clerk and organist
- Dirch Passer – Bartolomeus
- Håkan Westergren – The Bishop
- Åke Fridell – Mr. Paular
- Lissi Alandh – Mrs. Paular
- Arne Källerud – The Mailman
- Christer Söderlund – Soldier
- Anne Grete Nissen – Barbro, the evil witch
- Kim Anderzon – Agneta
- Louise Tillberg – Sylfidia
- Mona Månsson Ivarson – Berlack
- Suzanne Hovinder – Alma
- Cornelis Vreeswijk – Troubadour
- Inger Öjebro – Dagmar
- Karin Miller – Anna
- Cleo Boman – Greta
- Berit Hindersson – Ingeborg
- Bibi Nilsson – Birgit
- Emma Wickman – Young messenger
- Maud Hyttenberg – Cook
- Louis Miehe-Renard – Antonio, professor
- Tor Isedal – Obliquely man with a warped wig
- Ewert Granholm – Magister
