= Destiny (band) =

Swedish heavy metal band

- Origin: Gothenburg
- Genres: Heavy metal
- Years active: 1980–present
- Labels: GMR Music Group
- Members: Jonas Heidgert; Stefan Björnshög; Michael Åberg; Veith Offenbächer; Kane Svantesson
- Website: destinymetal.com

Destiny is a Swedish heavy metal band that was formed in 1980 by Stefan Björnshög (bass) and Magnus Österman (guitar). The band has released seven albums to date. Their debut album Beyond All Sense was released in 1985 and their latest one, Climate Change, in October 2016. The band categorises its music as "mörk rock", which in English translates to "dark rock". Stefan Björnshög is the only remaining member from the original line-up.

== History ==
The band's history traces back to 1980 when bassist Stefan Björnshög first met guitarist Magnus Österman. Together they formed the band Hexagon but soon changed its moniker to Destiny. After recording one demo in 1982 with singer Therese Hanseroth (1964–2012), they went through some line-up changes and vocalist Håkan Ring was added to the line-up. A contract was signed with a company called Musik Bolaget and recordings of the debut album Beyond All Sense took place in Studio Bohus, Kungälv, in December 1984. The main instrumentation for the album was recorded live during one single day, with only vocals, guitar solos and keyboards added afterwards. The album was later re-recorded with Kristoffer Göbel (Falconer) handling vocals and was released in 2005, 20 years after the original album.

The band's second album, Atomic Winter, was released on U.S. Metal Records in 1988 with new singer Zenny Hansson joining the group. The record was mixed by Ilbert and Chips from the band Sator. The cover art for the album was created by Derek Riggs, who is otherwise most known for creating a wide array of art for the band Iron Maiden. The album got a lot of positive attention in international hard rock and metal publications, and the band did a promotional tour in Germany and the Benelux area.

The recordings of the next album, Nothing Left to Fear, took place during the years 1989–1990. The band decided to leave U.S. Metal Records after encountering problems concerning the cover art (once again to be created by Derek Riggs) and the recording itself, which the label wanted the band to redo completely. Instead Destiny signed with English label Active Records. The album was remixed and finally released in June 1991. The artwork by Riggs was never used. The same year the band filmed its first video for the song "Evil Trinity" and toured during the summer as openers for American progressive metal band Savatage.

Zenny Hansson left the band during 1992 and without a singer the band's career was temporarily halted. Singer Daniel Heiman (Lost Horizon/Crystal Eyes/Heed) joined for a few months in 1994 but in the end Zenny Hansson (now Zenny Gram) returned to the ranks and, in 1996, recordings of the fourth album, The Undiscovered Country, could finally take place. As the musical climate for hard rock and heavy metal music was quite poor in 1996, the band decided to rest on its laurels and the albums was not released until 1998 when the band signed with label GNW. It received good reviews internationally but as their new label did not have enough resources to push the album it went largely unnoticed.

Prior to the recordings of Future of the Past the turbulence in the line-up continued. Vocalist Zenny Gram left the ranks again and new guitarists and drummers came and went. Kristoffer Göbel (Falconer) joined the band in 2001 and the recording process of the fifth album began in early 2002. In 2003, the band signed with GMR but the release of Future of the Past, due to various problems with the cover art etc., was delayed until April 2004. A video was also filmed for the song "In The Shadow Of The Rainbow". In the autumn of the same year the band re-recorded their debut album Beyond All Sense, plus two extra songs, and released it as Beyond All Sense 2005 the following year. The band included a bonus DVD with the release; containing videos, live footage and other extras.

Apart from a few shows, opening for ex. Black Sabbath-singer Tony Martin on his tour of Sweden in 2006 for example, nothing much happened during the next few years. Singer Kristoffer Göbel also left later that same year. While most of the music for the new album was finished and recorded, the band could not find a new singer, and the years passed by with the band remaining mostly inactive. As 2012, and with it the band's 30th anniversary, drew closer, the idea arose to record and release an album to celebrate it. The original plan had been to re-record Nothing Left to Fear, but now the band decided to keep the six tracks they had already recorded for that and add other tracks. They also finally found their new frontman in Jonas Heidgert and recordings of the anniversary album proceeded towards completion. In the end this idea became the album Climate Change, which was finally released in October 2016, once again on GMR. On top of the six songs mentioned earlier, it also contains one song each from three albums (Atomic Winter, The Undiscovered Country and Future of the Past) and five previously unrecorded songs from the early days.

Currently the band is busy promoting Climate Change. The album has received positive reviews internationally and two acclaimed videos for the songs "Living Dead" and "Sabotage" have been released.

== Members ==
Current

- Jonas Heidgert – vocals
- Stefan Björnshög – bass
- Michael Åberg – guitar
- Veith Offenbächer – guitar
- Kane Svantesson – drums

Former

- Carl Dahlberg – keyboards
- Roger Christiansson – drums
- Birger Löfman – drums (on Future of the Past, Beyond All Sense 2005)
- Kristoffer Göbel – vocals (on Future of the Past, Beyond All Sense 2005)
- Zenny Gram – vocals (on Atomic Winter, Nothing Left to Fear, The Undiscovered Country)
- Håkan Ring – vocals (on Beyond All Sense)
- Janne Ekberg – guitar (on Future of the Past, Beyond All Sense 2005)
- Niclas Granath – guitar (on Future of the Past)
- Anders Fagerstrand – guitar (on Future of the Past)
- Thomas Fredén – drums
- Knut Hassel – guitar (on The Undiscovered Country)
- Bengt Olsson – guitar
- Gunnar Kindberg – guitar (on Nothing Left to Fear)
- Floyd Konstantin – guitar (on Atomic Winter)
- Jörgen Pettersson – guitar (on Atomic Winter)
- John Prodén – guitar (on Beyond All Sense)
- Magnus Österman – guitar (on Beyond All Sense)
- Håkan Svantesson – drums (on The Undiscovered Country)
- Peter Lundgren – drums (on Beyond All Sense, Atomic Winter, Nothing Left to Fear)
- Therese Hanseroth – vocals
- Björn Centergran – drums

Guest musicians

- Fredrik Olsson – guitars (Beyond All Sense 2005)
- Linus Wikström – harmony guitar (Beyond All Sense 2005)
- Mathias Rosén – keyboards (Beyond All Sense 2005)
- Mats Olauseon – keyboards (Future of the Past)
- Ken Olsson – keyboards (Nothing Left to Fear, Beyond All Sense)
- Henryk Lipp – keyboards (Atomic Winter)
- Daniel Heiman – backing vocals (The Undiscovered Country)
- Fredrik Johansson – growl vocals (Future of the Past)

== Discography ==
- Beyond All Sense (1985)
- Atomic Winter (1988)
- Nothing Left to Fear (1991)
- The Undiscovered Country (1998)
- Future of the Past (2004)
- Beyond All Sense 2005 (2005)
- Climate Change (2016)
