= Falconer (album) =

Studio album by Falconer
- Released: 8 May 2001
- Recorded: November 2000, at Los Angered Recording Studio, Gothenburg
- Genre: Power metal, folk metal
- Length: 51:44
- Label: Metal Blade Records
- Producer: Falconer

Falconer chronology
Falconer (2001)	Chapters from a Vale Forlorn (2002)

Professional ratings
Review scores
Source	Rating
AllMusic	3/5 stars

Falconer is the debut album by Swedish power metal band Falconer. In 2017, Loudwire ranked it as the 14th-best power metal album of all time.

== Track listing ==
All songs written by Stefan Weinerhall.

No.	Title	Length
1.	"Upon the Grave of Guilt"	4:57
2.	"Heresy in Disguise"	5:19
3.	"Wings of Serenity"	5:00
4.	"A Quest for the Crown"	4:14
5.	"Mindtraveller"	5:45
6.	"Entering Eternity"	5:14
7.	"Royal Galley"	4:16
8.	"Substitutional World"	7:42
9.	"Lord of the Blacksmiths"	4:43
10.	"The Past Still Lives On"	4:34
11.	"Per Tyrssons Döttrar i Vänge" (Bonus track)	4:51

== Credits ==
- Mathias Blad – vocals, keyboards
- Stefan Weinerhall – guitars, bass
- Karsten Larsson – drums
- Ulrika Olausson – guest vocals on "Töres döttrar i Wänge"
