= Doris (singer) =

Swedish pop singer (1947–2023)

Background information
- Born: Doris Svensson; 1 July 1947; Gothenburg, Sweden
- Died: 15 January 2023 (aged 75)
- Genres: Pop, soul, funk, psychedelic
- Occupation: Singer
- Years active: 1960–1970
- Labels: Odeon, Mr Bongo

Doris Svensson (1 July 1947 – 15 January 2023), billed mononymously as Doris, was a Swedish pop singer. Doris was best known for her lone solo album of eclectic pop, rock and funk, Did You Give the World Some Love Today Baby, recorded in 1970. The record was re-issued in 1996 to critical acclaim.

== Biography ==
Doris Svensson was born on 1 July 1947 in Gothenburg. Her singing career began in 1962 by recording a 45 with the local band The Strangers. She went on recording with Plums, including the tracks "You Made a Fool of Me Last Night" and "Wouldn't That Be Groovy", and The Dandys, including "Go Back to Daddy".

In April 1970, Doris went to record in the EMI studios of Stockholm. Most of the lyrics of the songs were by Scottish writer Francis Cowan. The material was composed by TV producer, jazz-pianist, and composer Berndt Egerbladh. He also provided the big band brass arrangements for the tracks. The heavy drumming on the tracks was performed by Janne Carlsson from the duo Hansson & Karlsson, and the bass was played by Lucas Lindholm. The album Did You Give the World Some Love Today Baby was issued by Odeon in Sweden, 1970.

Doris died on 15 January 2023, at the age of 75.

== Reception ==
The promotional singles distributed in U.K. and France in 1970 attracted little attention among the audiences. After Mr Bongo label re-issued Did You Give the World Some Love Today Baby in Sweden and U.K. in 1996, and U.S. and Canada in 1998 with bonus tracks from Doris's earlier period, the LP caused interest among the alternative listeners as an odd funk rarity from the archives of Swedish pop. The Montreal Mirror newsweekly reviewed it as:"A relic of epic Swedish pop from '70. Perfectly hilarious and hilariously perfect." Subsequently, the tracks "Did You Give the World Some Love Today?", "Don't", "Beatmaker", and "You Never Come Closer" were included in eleven retrospective compilation albums issued all over Europe. Mr Bongo label issued Did You Give the World Some Love Today Baby in U.K. again in 2006. Her psychedelic jazz song "You Never Come Closer" is featured on the compilation LPs The Best Smooth Jazz... Ever! and Pregnant Rainbows for Colourblind Dreamers: The Essence of Swedish Progressive Music 1967–1979. The Sunday Times reviewed the song's instrumental and vocal style as:"...Hendrix backing Björk." The Blaxploitation.com database listed Did You Give the World Some Love Today Baby among the Forty Essential Funk Albums of the music history. Doris's tracks have received airplay in the retro music radio programs, including on BBC Radio 1, East Village Radio, FBi Radio of Australia, Q Radio, Raadio 2 of Estonia, and Radio Fritz of Germany.

"You Never Come Closer" was sampled on "Closer" by influential hip-hop producer Madlib for Quasimoto. This has led to Doris' work becoming increasingly popular amongst underground hip-hop fans and record collectors. "You Never Come Closer" can be heard in the video game Grand Theft Auto V, on the fictional radio station called FlyLo FM. The TV comedy Toast of Tinseltown used a cover version of "Beatmaker" performed by Matt Berry and Emma Noble as its end theme.
