= Regina Lund =

Swedish actress (born 1967)

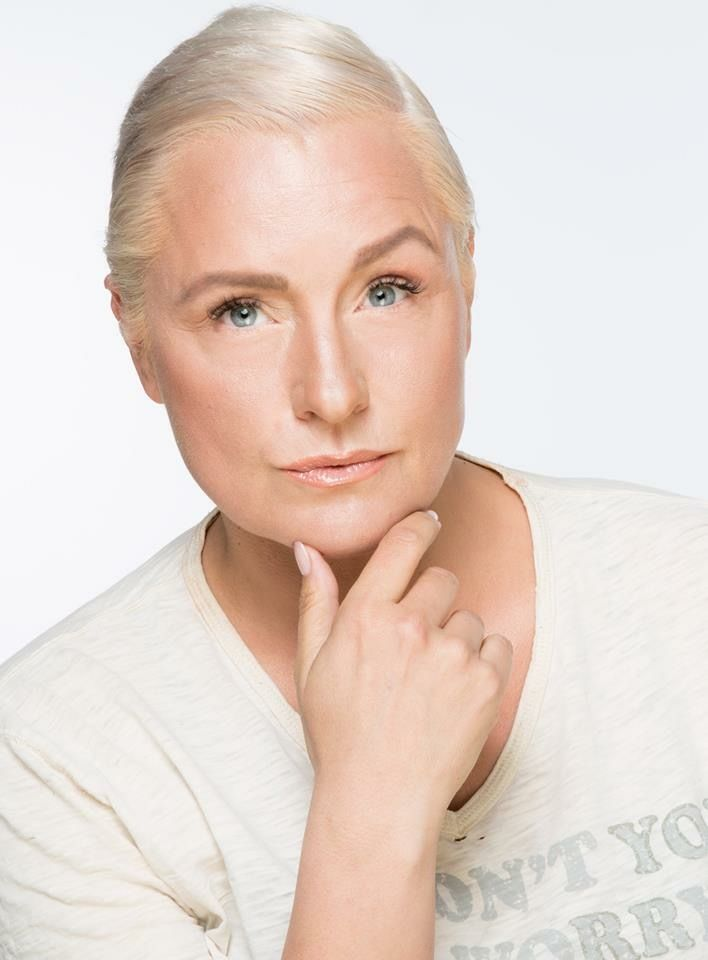
- Lund in 2015
- Born: Regina Charlotta Theodora Lund; 17 July 1967 (age 59); Vaasa, Finland
- Occupations: Actress, singer
- Years active: 1979–present
- Children: 1

Regina Charlotta Theodora Lund (born 17 July 1967) is a Swedish actress, musical artist, singer-songwriter, poet, writer, model, comedian and painter. She is known for film, television, radio, and theatre, as well as musicals and dramas on stage. Soon after acting school, she played Ophelia in Shakespeare's Hamlet directed by the eldest son of Ingmar Bergman, Jan Bergman, which toured throughout Sweden.

== Early life ==
Born to director Christian Lund (1943–2007) and actress Sonja Lund (b. 1942) in Vaasa, Finland, while her parents were working there in theatre. Regina grew up in Gävle, Sweden with her grandparents. From the age of 10 to 18, Regina spent summers with family members in the United States and was an exchange student in Salt Lake City throughout her last year of high school. Her acting career began when she was 11.

== Career ==
Regina started her acting career in a non-speaking role in the television movie Den nya människan in 1979, directed by her father. She made her big breakthrough as Laila Klang, a housewife in Tierp in the radio show Klang & Co in 1993 and as the secretary Mona in the television series Rederiet, a role she played between 1994–1995 and again in 2001. In 1995 Lund was awarded the Guldmasken (in English: The Golden Mask) award for Best female lead in a musical for her role in I hetaste laget.

In 2004, she was one of the hosts of Sommar, talking about her life and her career up to that point. In 2007, she performed the song "Rainbow star" in Melodifestivalen 2007 but was eliminated in the first round in one of the semifinals. She voiced the role of Gloria the Hippopotamus in the Swedish dubbed version of DreamWorks film Madagascar.

Lund launched her acting career in the 1996 film Harry & Sonja, where she played a lifeguard at a swimming pool with Stellan Skarsgård. She had the leading role in the 1999 thriller film Sjön. After that she had more leading roles in Hassel – Förgöraren and had a part in Once in a Lifetime (Livet är en schlager), a comedy film about the Eurovision Song Contest. In 2004 she appeared in the controversial film Kärlekens språk and she also starred in the film Göta kanal 2 – Kanalkampen.

== Music ==
Lund made her musical debut on the 1997 Johan Norberg album 5 Hours 4 Months and a Day. Norberg later appeared on Lund's debut solo album Unique and also her second music album Year Zero, released in 1997 and 2000 respectively.

== Theater and musical work ==
Lund made her stage debut in 1991 in Malmö as Curley's wife in John Steinbeck's Of Mice and Men. She also had the part of Ophelia in Jan Bergman's Hamlet at Riksteatern in Stockholm in 1992. The same year she acted as Beth in Sam Shepard's Den innersta lögnen (English: The Innermost Lie). The year after that she played a part in the musical I hetaste laget (English: Too Hot to Handle) at Cirkus, Stockholm.

In 1996, she acted as the character Lola in the play Blå Ängeln, and also had a role in Censorn in Gothenburg.

== Personal life ==
Lund has a son, born in 1999. She was married to actor Jonas Malmsjö between 2000 and 2002. Between 2006 and 2008, she lived in Copenhagen. In 2013, Lund revealed to Aftonbladet newspaper that she had been diagnosed and operated for cancer in her breasts and lymph nodes. In early 2014, Lund revealed that she was cancer free.

== Theater work ==
- 1992 – Hamlet – Ofelia
- 1993 – Häxjakten – Abigal
- 1994 – I hetaste laget
- 1995 – Moder Svea – ett äkta svenskt självmord
- 2003 – GG – Greta Garbo
- 2003 – Victor/Victoria
- 2008 – Blodsbröder – Mrs Lyons
- 2010 – Liket som visste för mycket – Maria Nylén (Dröse & Norberg)

== Filmography ==
- 1971 – Badjävlar (TV film)
- 1979 – Den nya människan (TV film)
- 1986 – Studierektorns sista strid (TV series)
- 1989 – Kronvittnet (TV series)
- 1991 – Midsommar (TV film)
- 1992 – Kvällspressen (TV series)
- 1994 – SWIP (TV series)
- 1994-95/ 2001 – Rederiet (TV series)
- 1993 – Det uppdämda hatets bottenlösa bassänger (TV film)
- 1993 – Pariserhjulet (TV series)
- 1994 – Fallet Paragon (TV series)
- 1995 – Rena Rama Rolf (TV series)
- 1996 – Anna Holt (TV series)
- 1996 – Euroboy
- 1997 – Sjukan (TV series)
- 1998 – Teater
- 1998 – Ivar Kreuger (TV series)
- 1998 – Aspiranterna (TV series)
- 1999 – Nya lögner (TV film)
- 1999 – The Longest Journey
- 1999 – Sjön
- 2000 – Livet är en schlager
- 2003 – Solisterna
- 2004 – Hollywood
- 2004 – Kärlekens språk
- 2005 – Wallander – Luftslottet
- 2005 – Göta kanal 2 – kanalkampen
- 2006 – Isabella (TV series)
- 2008 – Jenny ger igen
- 2010 – Mammas pojke

== Discography ==
=== Albums ===
- 1997 – Unique
- 2000 – Year Zero
- 2004 – Everybody's Darling
- 2006 – Förlåt! Nej, jag menar aj.
- 2011 – Living in Airports

=== Singles ===
- 1997 – "Unique" / "One Day Jesus"
- 1998 – "Silent Green" (inh. Stonebridge Radio Version, Red Mecca Remix, StoneBridge Full Version, Album Version)
- 2000 – "Miss Colourful" (inh. Miss Colourful, Johnny's Having a Breakdown)
- 2003 – "Önska" (Carlsohn feat. Regina Lund) (inh. Radiomix, Orkestermix, Klubbmix, Musikvideo)
- 2004 – "Too Small"
- 2007 – "Rainbow Star" (inh. Radio Version, Oscar Holter Remix, Karaoke Version)
- 2009 – "On the Waterfront" (w/ Raymond Watts)
- 2010 – "All Over My Body" (w/ Conny Bloom)
- 2011 – "In the Atmosphere"
- 2011 – "Living in Airports"
- 2011 – "Starlight" (w/Mmadcatz)

== Bibliography ==
- 2005 – Diktsamlingen Förlåt! Nej, jag menar aj!
- 2009 – Romanen Nothing but the Veil
- 2011 – Diktsamlingen Laserstrålar
