= Maid in Sweden =

1971 film

- Directed by: Floch Johnson
- Written by: Ronnie Friedland; George T. Norris
- Produced by: Ami Artzi
- Starring: Christina Lindberg; Monica Ekman; Krister Ekman; Leif Naeslund
- Cinematography: Hans Welin
- Edited by: George T. Norris
- Music by: Bob Nash
- Production companies: Cannon Productions; Jena Films
- Distributed by: Cannon Releasing
- Release date: 3 November 1971
- Running time: 80 minutes
- Countries: United States; Sweden
- Language: English

Maid in Sweden is a 1971 American and Swedish drama and soft-core erotic film directed by Dan Wolman. This film starring Christina Lindberg, Monica Ekman, Krister Ekman, Leif Naeslund, Per-Axel Arosenius in the lead roles. It was shot entirely in Sweden with a Swedish cast speaking english. The film music composed by Bob Nash.

== Plot ==
To spend the weekend with her older, emancipated sister Greta and her worthless boyfriend Carsten, 16-year-old Inga, a sweet and innocent country girl, leaves her remote farm in the Swedish countryside. Statuesque Inga discovers sex, breaks her inhibitions, and connects with her developing sexuality as she enters the large city of Stockholm. Men are drawn to her effortless natural beauty. Is sex as good as she thought it would be?

== Cast ==
- Christina Lindberg - Inga (as Kristina Lindberg)
- Monica Ekman - Greta
- Krister Ekman - Casten
- Leif Naeslund - Bjorn (as Leif Näslun)
- Per-Axel Arosenius - Father (as Per Axel Arosenius)
- Ittla Frodi - Mother (as Itela Frodi)
- Tina Hedström - Helen
- Henrik Meyer - Ole
- Wivian Öiangen - Brita (as Vivianne Öjengen)
