= Armod =

Studio album by Falconer
- Released: 3 June 2011
- Recorded: December 2010 – January 2011, Sonic Train Studios, Varberg, Sweden
- Genre: Folk metal
- Length: 49:38
- Language: Swedish
- Label: Metal Blade Records

Falconer chronology
Among Beggars and Thieves (2008)	Armod (2011)	Black Moon Rising (2014)

Professional ratings
Review scores
Source	Rating
Jukebox:Metal	2/5 stars
Thrash Hits	4.5/6 stars

Armod (Poverty) is the seventh album by the Swedish power metal band Falconer, released on 3 June 2011 through Metal Blade Records. Compared to the previous albums, Armod is more influenced by folk music and is sung entirely in Swedish (except for the bonus tracks which are Black Widow, O, Silent Solitude, Grimborg and by the Roses' Grave included on the Digipak version released on 7 June 2011).

== Track listing ==
No.	Title	Translation	Length
1.	"Svarta änkan"	Black Widow	6:55
2.	"Dimmornas drottning"	Queen of the Mists	4:17
3.	"Griftefrid"	Peace of Tomb	4:20
4.	"O, tysta ensamhet" (trad)	O, Silent Solitude	4:08
5.	"Vid rosornas grav"	By The Roses' Grave	5:52
6.	"Grimborg"		3:31
7.	"Herr Peder och hans syster"	Mr. Peder and His Sister	7:17
8.	"Eklundapolskan"	The Eklunda Polska	2:56
9.	"Grimasch om morgonen" (Cornelis Vreeswijk cover)	Grimace in the morning	2:29
10.	"Fru Silfver"	Mrs. Silfver	4:32
11.	"Gammal fäbodpsalm"	Old Fäbod Psalm	3:21
