= Heinz Hopf (actor) =

Swedish actor (1934–2001)

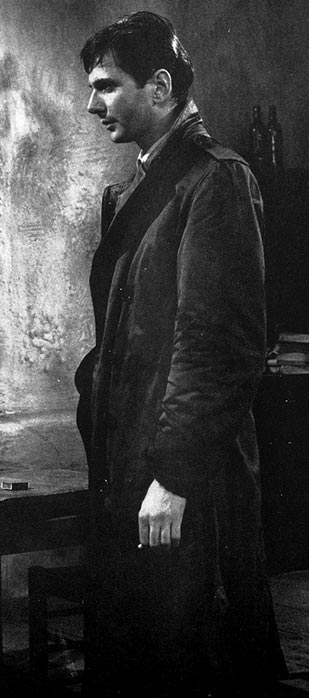
- Hopf performing on stage in 1963
- Born: Heinz Willy Gustav Hopf; 11 November 1934; Stockholm, Sweden
- Died: 23 January 2001 (aged 66); Åkersberga, Sweden
- Occupation: Actor
- Years active: 1956-2001

Heinz Willy Gustav Hopf (11 November 1934 – 23 January 2001) was a Swedish actor.

He was born in Stockholm but moved to Lund where he studied medicine at Lund University 1954-1955. He later became a regular actor at the Royal Dramatic Theatre in Stockholm. Internationally, he is best known for playing the pimp in Thriller – A Cruel Picture (1974).

Heinz Hopf died from laryngeal cancer in 2001.

== Filmography ==
Year	Title	Role	Notes
1956	Rasmus, Pontus och Toker	Krister	
1961	Pojken i trädet	Max	
1964	Loving Couples	Lt. Bernhard Landborg	
1965	Morianna	Boris	
1966	Träfracken	Martin	
1966	Woman of Darkness	Helmertz / Judge	
1967	Mördaren - en helt vanlig person	Gregor Hult	
1967	The Vicious Circle	Man on Beach	
1968	Kvinnolek	Nils Vennberg, Lisa's coworker	
1970	Ann and Eve	Walter	
1971	Exponerad	Helge / Blackmailer	
1971	Lockfågeln	Gambler	
1972	AWOL	Film Director	
1972	The Day the Clown Cried	Gestapo Officer #1	
1973	Smutsiga fingrar	Harry, the boss	
1973	Thriller – A Cruel Picture	Tony / Pimp	
1977	Tabu	Biceps	
1982	Fanny and Alexander	Tomas Graal (Actor) - Teatern	
1985	Mask of Murder	Carlos, the Hairdresser	
1986	Amorosa	Doctor Iller	
1987	Fadern, sonen och den helige ande		
1987	The Girl	David	
1988	Friends	Lawyer	
1989	1939	Hans Thomsen	
1989	The Hired Gun	The Doctor	
1993	The Slingshot	Shoe salesman	
1993	Kärlekens himmelska helvete	Carl	
