= Black Moon Rising (album) =

Studio album by Falconer
- Released: 10 June 2014
- Recorded: January–March 2014 at the Sonic Train Studios, Varberg
- Genre: Power metal, folk metal
- Length: 50:59
- Label: Metal Blade Records

Falconer chronology
Armod (2011)	Black Moon Rising (2014)	From a Dying Ember (2020)

Black Moon Rising is the eighth album by the Swedish Folk metal band Falconer, released on 10 June 2014 through Metal Blade Records. The track listing was revealed and the album went up for order on 16 April 2014.

== Track listing ==
No.	Title	Length
1.	"Locust Swarm"	5:36
2.	"Halls and Chambers"	5:01
3.	"Black Moon Rising"	5:10
4.	"Scoundrel and the Squire"	3:00
5.	"Wasteland"	5:12
6.	"In Ruins"	5:25
7.	"At the Jester's Ball"	4:20
8.	"There's a Crow on the Barrow"	4:05
9.	"Dawning of a Sombre Age"	3:39
10.	"Age of Runes"	5:32
11.	"The Priory"	3:59
