= Atomic Winter (album) =

Studio album by Destiny
- Released: September 1988
- Recorded: Music.A.Matic Studio, Gothenburg, Sweden, 1988
- Genre: Heavy metal
- Length: 42:59
- Label: US Metal
- Producer: Destiny

Destiny chronology
Beyond All Sense (1985)	Atomic Winter (1988)	Nothing Left to Fear (1991)

Atomic Winter is the Swedish heavy metal band Destiny's second studio album. It was released in September 1988 on both vinyl and CD.

The album contains a re-recording of the song "Spellbreaker" from the previous album Beyond All Sense. The album cover was painted by Derek Riggs, of Iron Maiden fame.

== Reception ==
Professional ratings
Review scores
Source	Rating
Kerrang!	4.5/5 stars

The album plunged into obscurity, despite positive responses from reviewers. "I won't waste space with their history, since I need all the space to praise them", a fanzine reviewer wrote. Paul Miller of Kerrang! claimed that "Quality of this sort his hard to find" and gave Atomic Winter KKKK½. Domestic reviews were also favourable: "Without doubt one of the most interesting bands" was Tore Lund's verdict on the tabloid GT, whereas Fia Persson of Expressen found the album to be "surprisingly fast and good".

== Track listing ==
1. "Bermuda" (Floyd Konstantin, Zenny Gram, Jörgen Pettersson) - 4:15
2. "Who Am I" (Konstantin, Gram) - 3:40
3. "Spellbreaker" (Magnus Österman) - 3:55
4. "Beware" (Konstantin, Gram, Pettersson) - 4:49
5. "Religion" (Stefan Björnshög, Gram, Pettersson) - 5:25
6. "The Extreme Unction" (Petterson, Håkan Ring) - 2:48
7. "Dark Heroes" (Gram, Pettersson) - 6:38
8. "Living Dead" (Björnshög, Gram) - 3:20
9. "Atomic Winter" (Konstantin, Gram) - 8:09

== Personnel ==
=== Band members ===
- Zenny Gram (formerly Hansson) - lead and backing vocals
- Stefan Björnshög - bass, backing vocals
- Floyd Konstantin - guitar
- Jörgen Pettersson - guitar
- Peter Lundgren - drums

=== Additional musicians ===
- Henryk Lipp - keyboards
- Pär Edwardsson, Thomas Eriksson - backing vocals
