= Exponerad =

- Directed by: Gustaf Wiklund
- Written by: Tony Forsberg
- Produced by: Ingemar Ejve, Gustav Wiklund
- Starring: Christina Lindberg; Heinz Hopf
- Edited by: Ingemar Ejve
- Music by: Berndt Egerbladh, Ralph Lundsten
- Distributed by: Olympic Film International AB (Sweden)
- Release date: 1 May 1971
- Running time: 92 minutes
- Country: Sweden
- Language: Swedish

Exponerad (transl. Exposed), also known as Diary of a Rape, The Depraved, and Exposed, is a 1971 Swedish sexploitation film directed by Lars Gustaf Emil Wiklund (not to be confused with the actor Gustav Wiklund) and starring Christina Lindberg.

== Plot premise ==
Lena, played by Lindberg, has a boyfriend but is lured in by an abusive older man. Lena's perceptions of the events remain largely ambiguous to the viewer, in part due to the film's nonlinear narrative.

== Release and reception ==
The film was initially released at the 1971 Cannes Film Festival. After screening, it was banned in 27 countries— a fact that was later used widely in the film's promotional materials.

In the U.S., 15 minutes were edited out of the film and it was marketed under the titles Diary of a Rape and The Depraved, although the advertising for The Depraved stated that it was being presented without a single cut. The English-language versions now available use the translation of the original title, Exposed.

Like many sexploitation films, it was widely considered gratuitously sexual and violent, but some critics today still note the film's non-linear timeline and otherwise relatively artistic presentation.

The film was re-released in 2012 alongside five other films as part of The Swedish Erotica Collection.

== Cast ==
- Christina Lindberg ... Lena Svensson (as Cristina Lindberg)
- Heinz Hopf... Helge
- Björn Adelly ... Jan, Lena's boyfriend
- Siv Ericks ... Jan's Mother (as Siv Eriks)
- Janne Carlsson... Lars
- Birgitta Molin ... Ulla
- Margit Carlqvist... Lena's Mother
- Bert-Åke Varg ... Lena's Father (as Bert Åke Warg)
- Tor Isedal... Party Guest
