= Maud Hyttenberg =

Swedish actress

Maud Hyttenberg (26 April 1920 – 8 March 2009) was a Swedish actress.

She was born in Stockholm. She appeared in several films and television series, including 1970's The Lustful Vicar. She died in March 2009.

== Selected filmography ==
- Love Wins Out (1949)
- Crime in Paradise (1959)
