= Among Beggars and Thieves =

Studio album by Falconer
- Released: 2 September 2008
- Recorded: August 2008, at Sonic Train Studios, Varberg, Sweden
- Genre: Power metal
- Length: 47:06
- Label: Metal Blade Records

Falconer chronology
Northwind (2006)	Among Beggars and Thieves (2008)	Armod (2011)

Among Beggars and Thieves is the sixth album by the Swedish power metal band Falconer, released on 2 September 2008 through Metal Blade Records. It was produced by Andy LaRocque. A heavier album than Northwind, it tells the tale of the hardships of medieval Sweden. Some of the songs seem incrediblely inspired by actual historical events. For example, the song "Man of the Hour" apparently deals with the fate of the Swedish 17th century warship Kronan, the lyrics of "Mountain Men" bear a strong resemblance to the Engelbrekt rebellion, and "Boiling Led" appears to be about the assassination of Sverker I of Sweden.

== Track listing ==
All songs written by Stefan Weinerhall.

1. "Field of Sorrow" – 5:35
2. "Man of the Hour" – 3:56
3. "A Beggar Hero" – 2:08
4. "Vargaskall" (Wolf Hunt) – 4:19
5. "Carnival of Disgust" – 4:04
6. "Mountain Men" – 4:39
7. "Viddernas man" – 3:43
8. "Pale Light of Silver Moon" – 4:05
9. "Boiling Led" – 4:58
10. "Skula, skorpa, skalk" – 3:51
11. "Dreams and Pyres" – 7:50
12. "Dark Ages" (limited edition bonus track) – 3:28
13. "Vi Sålde Våra Hemman" (We Sold Our Homesteads) (limited edition bonus track) – 4:11
- Limited edition also includes the video for 'Carnival of Disgust'.
