= Kärlekens språk =

- Directed by: Anders Lennberg
- Screenplay by: Chi An Gramfors; Anders Lennberg; Lena Ollmark; Emma Hallin
- Produced by: Inge Ivarson
- Starring: Regina Lund; Jan Mybrand; Bert-Åke Varg; Kim Anderzon
- Cinematography: Håkan Lidman
- Distributed by: Blizz Entertainment AB
- Release date: 2 April 2004 (Sweden)
- Running time: 96 minutes
- Country: Sweden
- Language: Swedish

Kärlekens språk (or Kärlekens språk 2000) is a 2004 Swedish sex educational film directed by Anders Lennberg.

The title is a reference to the 1969 sex educational film Ur kärlekens språk (Language of Love).

== Cast ==
- Regina Lund
- Jan Mybrand
- Bert-Åke Varg
- Kim Anderzon
- Themba Tainton
- Maj-Briht Bergström-Walan
- Katerina Janouch
- Arne Weise
- Emma Tomasdotter Åberg
- Helena Lindblom
- Martin Hedman
- Sanna B. Danell
- Julia Klingener
- Emil Ahlén
- Mejdi Zoghlami
- Charly Wassberg Borbos
- Rick Petrini
- Sascha Zacharias
- Jeremy Wan
- Alex Levén
- Hanna Axelsson
- Elvira Castillo Åkerblom
- Joakim Ehrenberg
- Helena Thunell
- Thomas Olofsson
- Sara Sjögren
- Peter Lindén
- Seija Runsten
- Cissi Centerwall
- Michelle Meadows
- Jan Näpärä
- Gustav Söderberg
- Emma Hallin
- Sara Karlsson
- Micke Kazarnowicz
- Jane Nord
- Ebbe Damm
- Johan Karlsson
- Johan Westberg
- Joakim Karlsson
- Malin Westerholm
- Charles Murelius
- Ingemar Nord
- Therése Neaimé
- Micke Folke
- Sandy Mansson

== Production ==
The scene in which Regina Lund as Stella Måne has oral sex with her wheelchair-using boss, played by Jan Mybrand, was so explicit that the filmmakers cut several parts of the sequence. "We never wanted to make a pornographic film and that was one of the reasons why it was cut," said producer Inge Ivarsson.
