= Beyond All Sense =

Studio album by Destiny
- Released: March 13, 1985
- Recorded: 1984
- Genre: Heavy metal
- Label: Musik Bolaget
- Producer: Ken Olsson

Destiny chronology
Beyond All Sense (1985)	Atomic Winter (1988)

Beyond All Sense is Destiny's debut album. It was released in March 1985 on vinyl only.

Destiny re-recorded the entire album twenty years later as Beyond All Sense 2005.

== Track listing ==
1. "Intro - Destiny" – 1:33
2. "Rest In Peace" – 4:25
3. "Spellbreaker" – 4:52
4. "Hang Them High" – 2:34
5. "Sirens In The Dark" – 4:58
6. "Kill The Witch" – 3:57
7. "Lost To Heaven (instrumental)" – 1:46
8. "More Evil Than Evil" – 3:42
9. "Power by Birth" – 4:35
10. "Sacrilege" – 4:46

== Lineup ==
- Vocals: Håkan Ring
- Guitar: John Prodén
- Guitar: Magnus Österman
- Bass: Stefan Björnshög
- Drums: Peter Lundgren
