= Bo Arne Vibenius =

Swedish film director

- Born: 29 March 1943 (age 81); Solna, Stockholms län, Sweden
- Occupation: Film director

Bo Arne Vibenius (born 29 March 1943) is a Swedish film director, most famous for his exploitation classics Breaking Point and Thriller – A Cruel Picture (Swedish: Thriller – en grym film). The latter served as an influence on Quentin Tarantino when making his Kill Bill films and Tarantino has called it "the roughest revenge movie ever made."

== Filmography ==
- Hur Marie träffade Fredrik (1969)
- Thriller – A Cruel Picture (1973)
- Breaking Point (1975)
