= Thriller – A Cruel Picture =

1973 Swedish exploitation film by Bo Arne Vibenius

- Swedish film poster
- Swedish: Thriller – en grym film
- Literally: Thriller – a cruel film
- Directed by: Alex Fridolinski
- Screenplay by: Alex Fridolinski
- Produced by: Bo Arne Vibenius
- Starring: Christina Lindberg; Heinz Hopf
- Cinematography: Andreas Bellis
- Edited by: Brian Wikström
- Music by: Ralph Lundsten
- Production company: BAV Film
- Distributed by: Europafilm; Stockholm Film
- Release dates: May 1973 (Cannes); June 5, 1974 (US); October 30, 1974 (Sweden)
- Running time: 107 minutes (Note: The original cut of Thriller – A Cruel Picture which screened at the Cannes Film Festival (colloquially referred to as the "Festival Version") ran approximately 107 minutes in length. At the insistence of the Swedish film board, the film was truncated, first to 104 minutes, and later, to 86 minutes. The English-dubbed U.S. cuts of the film released by American International Pictures vary in length: one 82 minutes, and the other—titled They Called Her One Eye—90 minutes.)
- Country: Sweden
- Language: Swedish

Thriller – A Cruel Picture (Swedish: Thriller – en grym film) is a 1973 Swedish rape-and-revenge exploitation film written and directed by Bo Arne Vibenius under the pseudonym Alex Fridolinski, and starring Christina Lindberg and Heinz Hopf. It tells the story of a mute young woman who is forced into heroin addiction and prostitution, and her subsequent revenge on the people responsible.

The film was released in the United States in a truncated version by American International Pictures under several alternative titles, such as They Call Her One Eye, Hooker's Revenge and The Swedish Vice-Girl.

== Plot ==
A quiet girl, Madeleine, is sexually abused as a child, and the trauma makes her mute. Years later, while living on her parents' farm as a teenager, Madeleine misses the bus into town, and accepts a ride from a pimp named Tony. Tony takes the naive Madeleine out for dinner before bringing her back to his home, where he incapacitates her and repeatedly injects her with heroin, causing her to become addicted as a means of forcing her into prostitution.

To hide the fact that Madeleine was kidnapped, Tony writes hateful letters to her parents, signing them with Madeleine's name. Her parents become so distraught over their daughter's apparent betrayal that they commit suicide. When Madeleine initially refuses to have sex with a client, Tony beats her before slicing her eyeball with a scalpel. Now, donning an eyepatch over her maimed eye, Madeleine is subjected to a never-ending series of demoralizing sexual encounters with both male and female clients. Defeated by the state of her life, Madeleine is inspired by one of Tony's other prostitutes, Sally, to create an escape plan for herself.

Madeleine begins covertly stashing some of her earnings, and takes lessons in rally driving, field shooting, and different forms of martial arts, all unbeknownst to Tony. One day, Tony suddenly states that her colleague, Sally, has left the job for Beirut, however Madeleine quickly discovers that Sally's bed is still soaked and dripping with blood, and thus understands that she didn't abscond but instead has been murdered. Finally at her breaking point, the protagonist plans a revenge on Tony and his clientele.

Using the money she has stashed away, Madeleine purchases a car and a supply of heroin, breaks into the gun instructor's shed and steals a variety of weapons—including a sawed-off shotgun—preparing the attacks on her abusers. Shortly, Madeleine begins to dispatch the clients who have wronged her, first stalking one of the men, and shooting him to death with her shotgun on his front doorstep. Next, Madeleine locates another john dining at a restaurant with one of Madeleine's female clients, who regularly physically abused her, and shoots them both to death. While on a search for a next batch of heroin, she unsuspectedly falls into Tony's planned misdirection. Madeleine travels to a warehouse in a dock area where she finds two henchman Tony has tasked with killing her, but instead shoots and kills them both. Police arrive at the warehouse and find Madeleine seated with her shotgun. When they attempt to arrest her, she uses her martial arts training to incapacitate both officers and break free.

Madeleine absconds with the police car, and drives off to a rural fishing village, causing a series of reckless and fiery car accidents in her wake. In the village she is ambushed by Tony, whom she tries to shoot, however he luckily escapes due to a traffic blockage. At last, Madeleine writes Tony a post letter where she proposes a decisive duel to end the feud. She arrives at the place first and sets up a wired flare and later strolls and waits along a stone wall. Tony arrives and feigns sympathy, pretending he will reason with her. At his insistence, Madeleine puts down her shotgun, after which Tony threatens to shoot her with a pistol; before he can, however, she triggers a booby trap to distract him, and shoots him in both knees, incapacitating him. She proceeds to bind him with rope, and drags him to a meadow using a horse. There, she buries his body with stones, leaving only his head above ground, and ties a rope around his neck, which she tethers to the horse. Madeleine sits calmly and watches as Tony is strangled to death. Once he dies, she drives away in the police car.

== Cast ==
- Christina Lindberg as Madeleine / Frigga
  - Pamela Pethö-Galantai as young Madeline
- Heinz Hopf as Tony
- Despina Tomazani as the lesbian girl
- Per-Axel Arosenius as Madeleine's father
- Solveig Andersson as Sally
- Björn Kristiansson as the Addict
- Marie-Louise Mannervall as woman in village
- Hildur Lindberg as woman in village
- Marshall McDonagh as karate teacher
- Hans-Eric Stenborg as sex buyer
- Stig Ström as sex buyer
- Gunnel Wadner as Madeleine's mother
- Bo Arne Vibenius as food vendor

== Production ==
Director Bo Arne Vibenius sought to make "the most commercial film ever made", as he had lost money on an earlier film, and needed to recoup his loss. Lindberg confirmed in interviews that the filmmakers used the actual corpse of a woman who had committed suicide during the film's eye gouging scene, a revelation that sparked controversy. Hardcore pornographic sequences, in particular shots of unsimulated sex, were edited into the scenes in which the protagonist is raped, to capitalize on the trend of pornography in Denmark and Sweden, which was being liberalized at the time.

In Daniel Ekeroth's book on Swedish exploitation movies, Swedish Sensationsfilms: A Clandestine History of Sex, Thrillers, and Kicker Cinema, it is revealed that the producers took out a huge life insurance policy on star Christina Lindberg, as real ammunition was used in the action sequences, and that she was asked to inject saline solution during the heroin-use scenes.

== Release ==
=== Censorship and distribution ===
The original running time was 107 minutes. After being banned by the Swedish film censorship board, the film was truncated to 104 minutes and then 86 minutes, but still banned. It was finally released after being cut down to 82 minutes. In the United States, the film was distributed by American International Pictures, also in a truncated cut running 82 minutes. American International Pictures released the film in mid-1974 under the alternate titles Thriller and They Call Her One Eye, and, in 1975, as Hooker's Revenge.

=== Critical response ===
On the review aggregator website Rotten Tomatoes, 56% of 9 critics' reviews are positive, with an average rating of 6.1/10. TV Guide rated the film three out of four stars, writing, "Not for the fainthearted, or the easily bored, this brutal and depressing film nevertheless is not easily forgotten."

Time Out gave the film a negative review, criticizing the overuse of slow motion, hardcore scenes, and soundtrack, stating that it fails to leave any lingering emotional impact of its convictions. A.H. Weiler from The New York Times offered similar criticism, calling the film "dreary" and citing protagonist Lindberg as the film's only notable feature.

=== Home media ===
Synapse Films released Thriller – A Cruel Picture on DVD in October 2004 in a limited edition featuring the extended 107-minute cut. In 2005, Synapse released the shorter U.S. version as a standalone DVD, deeming it the "Vengeance Edition". On May 31, 2022, Vinegar Syndrome released the film in a 4-disc 4K UHD and Blu-ray combination set limited to 10,000 units. This edition features the original 108-minute cut, as well as an exclusive UHD of the 90-minute English-language version entitled They Call Her One Eye. After the limited edition set sold out in late-May 2022, Vinegar Syndrome made a standard edition 4K UHD and Blu-ray set available (also featuring the They Call Her One Eye cut, but only on Blu-ray).

== Legacy ==
Thriller – A Cruel Picture was marketed as the first film ever to be completely banned in Sweden, although the first one actually was Victor Sjöström's The Gardener from 1912. It has developed a cult following being a pioneer of the rape 'n' revenge subgenre (a long time before Meir Zarchi's I Spit on your Grave) and the B movies about female vengeance that were made through the 70s and 80s decades, and also as the basis for Elle Driver (Daryl Hannah) in Quentin Tarantino's Kill Bill.

== Sources ==
- Craig, Rob (2019). American International Pictures: A Comprehensive Filmography. Jefferson, North Carolina: McFarland. ISBN 978-1-476-66631-0.
- Ekeroth, Daniel (2011). Swedish Sensationsfilms: A Clandestine History of Sex, Thrillers, and Kicker Cinema. Translated by Magnus Henriksson. Brooklyn, New York: Bazillion Points. ISBN 978-0-9796163-6-5.
- Heller-Nicholas, Alexandra (2021) [2011]. Rape-Revenge Films: A Critical Study (2nd ed.). Jefferson, North Carolina: McFarland. ISBN 978-0-786-44961-3.
- Tarantino, Quentin; Peary, Gerald (2013). Quentin Tarantino: Interviews, Revised and Updated. Jackson, Mississippi: University Press of Mississippi. ISBN 978-1-617-03875-4.
