= Helena Johansson =

Swedish singer-songwriter (born 1901)

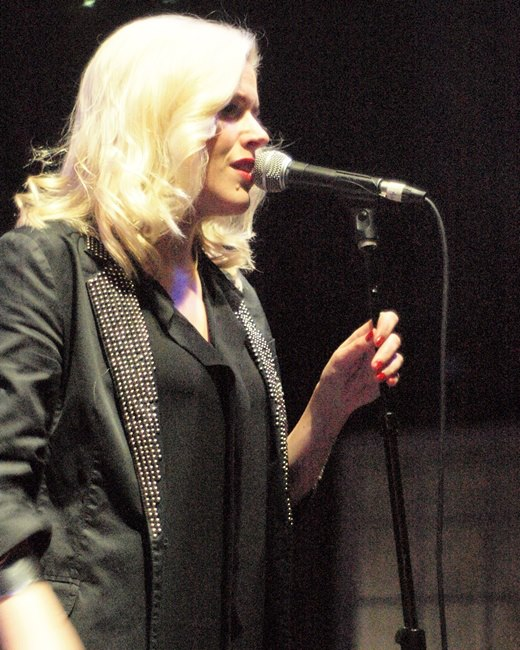
- Helena in 2012
- Born: Helena Viktoria Johansson; Stockholm, Sweden
- Occupations: Singer, Screenwriter

Helena Viktoria Johansson is a Swedish screenwriter and singer-songwriter.

Helena was born and raised in Stockholm, Sweden. She started singing at a very early age and in her teens also began writing her own music. After graduating from Kulturama in Stockholm (the leading school of performing arts in Scandinavia) she started performing her original music at clubs and other venues in Stockholm.

During 2006–2012 Helena lived in Nashville Tennessee to pursue a career in music. She wanted to develop her songwriting skills among the best songwriters in the world. In Nashville she met Swede Dan Ekbäck who was employed by the publishing company Bluewater Music at the time. Ekbäck has worked with artists such as Jill Johnson and Garth Brooks. After hearing Helena's demo he started introducing her to some of Nashville's most successful songwriters such as Liz Rose (Taylor Swift, LeAnn Rimes, Jewel).

American R&B, pop, soul, house singer/songwriter Martha Wash heard Helena's song "It's My Time" and decided to record and release it as her second single on her album Something Good (January 2013).

In May 2013 Helena released her first single "Lead The Way" from her up-coming and debut EP. Her second single "My Kind of Love", released in July, was voted "Pick of the Week" on Swedish National Radio Station P4 in October 2013. Helena's EP From The Ground Up was released on February 6, 2014.

She is currently living in Stockholm writing screenplays for feature films. Her debut film Sockerexperimentet will premiere in Swedish movie theaters in February 2023.
