= Berghem, Sweden =

Berghem
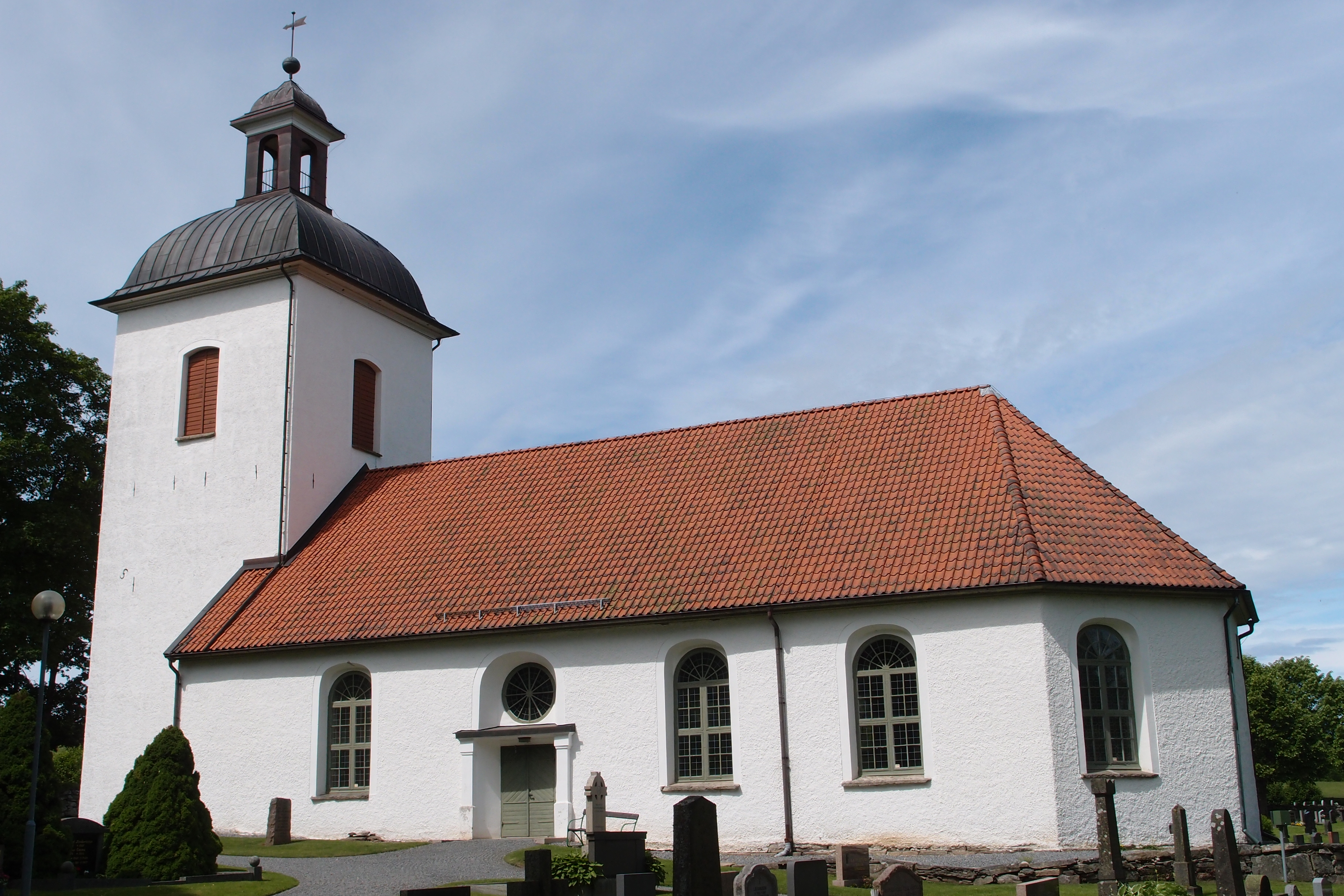
- Berghem Church

- Location within Västra Götaland Location within Sweden
- Coordinates: 57°28′N 12°35′E
- Country: Sweden
- Province: Västergötland
- County: Västra Götaland County
- Municipality: Mark Municipality

Area
  - Total: 0.79 km^{2} (0.31 sq mi)

Population (31 December 2010)
  - Total: 360
  - Density: 455/km^{2} (1,180/sq mi)
- Time zone: UTC+1 (CET)
  - Summer (DST): UTC+2 (CEST)

Berghem is a locality situated in Mark Municipality, Västra Götaland County, Sweden. It had 360 inhabitants in 2010.
