= Chapters from a Vale Forlorn =

Studio album by Falconer
- Released: 12 March 2002
- Recorded: November 2001
- Studio: Los Angered Recording Studio, Gothenburg, Sweden
- Genre: Power metal; folk metal
- Length: 40:41
- Label: Metal Blade
- Producer: Falconer

Falconer chronology
Falconer (2001)	Chapters from a Vale Forlorn (2002)	The Sceptre of Deception (2003)

Chapters from a Vale Forlorn is the second album by Swedish power metal band Falconer.

== Track listing ==
All songs written by Stefan Weinerhall, except where noted.

No.	Title	Length
1.	"Decadence of Dignity"	4:22
2.	"Enter the Glade"	3:48
3.	"Lament of a Minstrel"	4:13
4.	"For Life and Liberty"	6:23
5.	"We Sold Our Homesteads" (Traditional, translated into English by Mathias Blad)	4:11
6.	"The Clarion Call"	5:47
7.	"Portals of Light"	4:07
8.	"Stand in Veneration"	3:34
9.	"Busted to the Floor"	4:16

Japanese edition bonus track
No.	Title	Length
10.	"En Kungens Man" (Björn Afzelius)	3:58

== Credits ==
- Mathias Blad - vocals and keyboards
- Stefan Weinerhall - guitars and bass
- Karsten Larsson - drums

=== Guests ===
- Lead guitar on "Busted to the Floor" by Andy LaRocque
- Violin on "Portals of Light" by Sami Yousri
- Backing vocals on "Portals of Light" by Johan Wikström
- Flute by Sabine Daniels
- Piano on "Portals of Light" and Hammond organ on "Busted to the Floor" by Elias Holmlid (Dragonland)
