= Inge Ivarson =

Swedish film producer

- Born: 2 November 1917; Borås, Sweden
- Died: 22 June 2015 (aged 97)
- Occupations: Film producer Screenwriter
- Years active: 1945–1976

Inge Ivarson (2 November 1917 – 22 June 2015) was a Swedish film producer and screenwriter. He produced 40 films between 1945 and 2004. He was born in Borås, Sweden.

== Selected filmography ==
- The Girl from the Marsh Croft (1947)
- I Love You Karlsson (1947)
- A Swedish Tiger (1948)
- Big Lasse of Delsbo (1949)
- The Street (1949)
- Two Stories Up (1950)
- Sailors (1964)
- Här kommer bärsärkarna (1965)
- Morianna (1965)
- Language of Love (1969)
- The Lustful Vicar (1970)
- What the Swedish Butler Saw (1975)
