= Falconer (band) =

Swedish power metal band

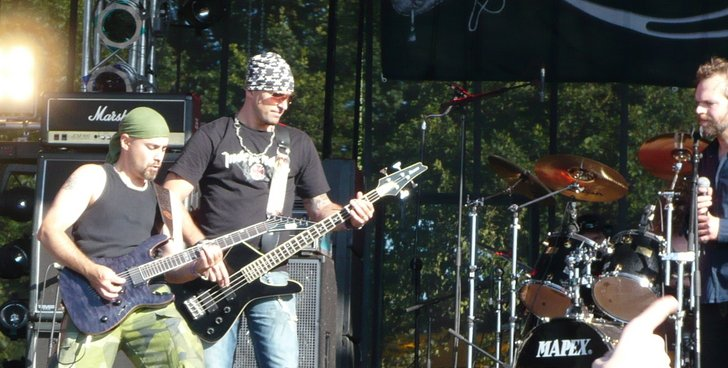
- Falconer at the Wacken Open Air in 2007

Background information
- Origin: Mjölby, Sweden
- Genres: Power metal, folk metal
- Years active: 1999–2020
- Label: Metal Blade
- Members: Mathias Blad; Stefan Weinerhall; Jimmy Hedlund; Magnus Linhardt; Karsten Larsson
- Past members: Kristoffer Göbel; Anders Johansson; Peder Johansson

Falconer was a Swedish power metal band from Mjölby, formed in 1999 by former Mithotyn guitarist Stefan Weinerhall. Falconer continued the traditions set by Weinerhall's previous band, and played power metal with folk instrumentation and melody to create a medieval sound.

== Biography ==
=== Origins ===
In 1992, Stefan Weinerhall, Christian "Christer" Schütz, and Johan, who left shortly afterward, founded blackened death metal band Cerberus. A year later, they renamed to Mithotyn. As such, they released an album in 1997. Much of the material on their three albums featured on previous demos, such as "The Guardian" from Promo '96. The group released three albums: In the Sign of the Ravens (1997, Black Diamond Productions), King of the Distant Forest (1998, Invasion Records), and Gathered Around the Oaken Table (1999, Invasion Records). Mithotyn officially dissolved in 1999.

Stefan Weinerhall, from Mjölby, founded Falconer in 1999. He planned to form a folk-influenced melodic metal band similar to Mithotyn but with clean singing rather than harsh vocals. A demo was recorded with a drum machine and Swedish actor/singer Mathias Blad's session vocals. After shopping the demo to labels, drummer Karsten Larsson (also ex-Mithotyn) joined the lineup, and Blad joined permanently. The band signed to Metal Blade Records. Weinerhall had played in Viking metal band Mithotyn from their formation until their split in 1999. He and Mithotyn bandmate Karl Beckman made two albums with black, thrash metal band Indungeon. Weinerhall played bass on the first album before switching to guitar for their second album, The Misanthropocalypse. He wrote nearly all Falconer's music and lyrics.

In November 2000, the band entered Los Angered Recording (now Sonic Train Studios) with Andy LaRocque and Jacob Hansen. Their debut album, Falconer, was recorded in three weeks and released in March in Europe and May in the United States. The album met with critical success, and demand for live performances led to the addition of session members.

Falconer returned to Los Angered in November 2001. Nine tracks and one bonus track were recorded and mixed in 24 days. The band licensed the album to Soundholic for Japanese distribution. Chapters from a Vale Forlorn was released on 7 February in Japan, and on 11 March in Europe and the US.

=== Members ===
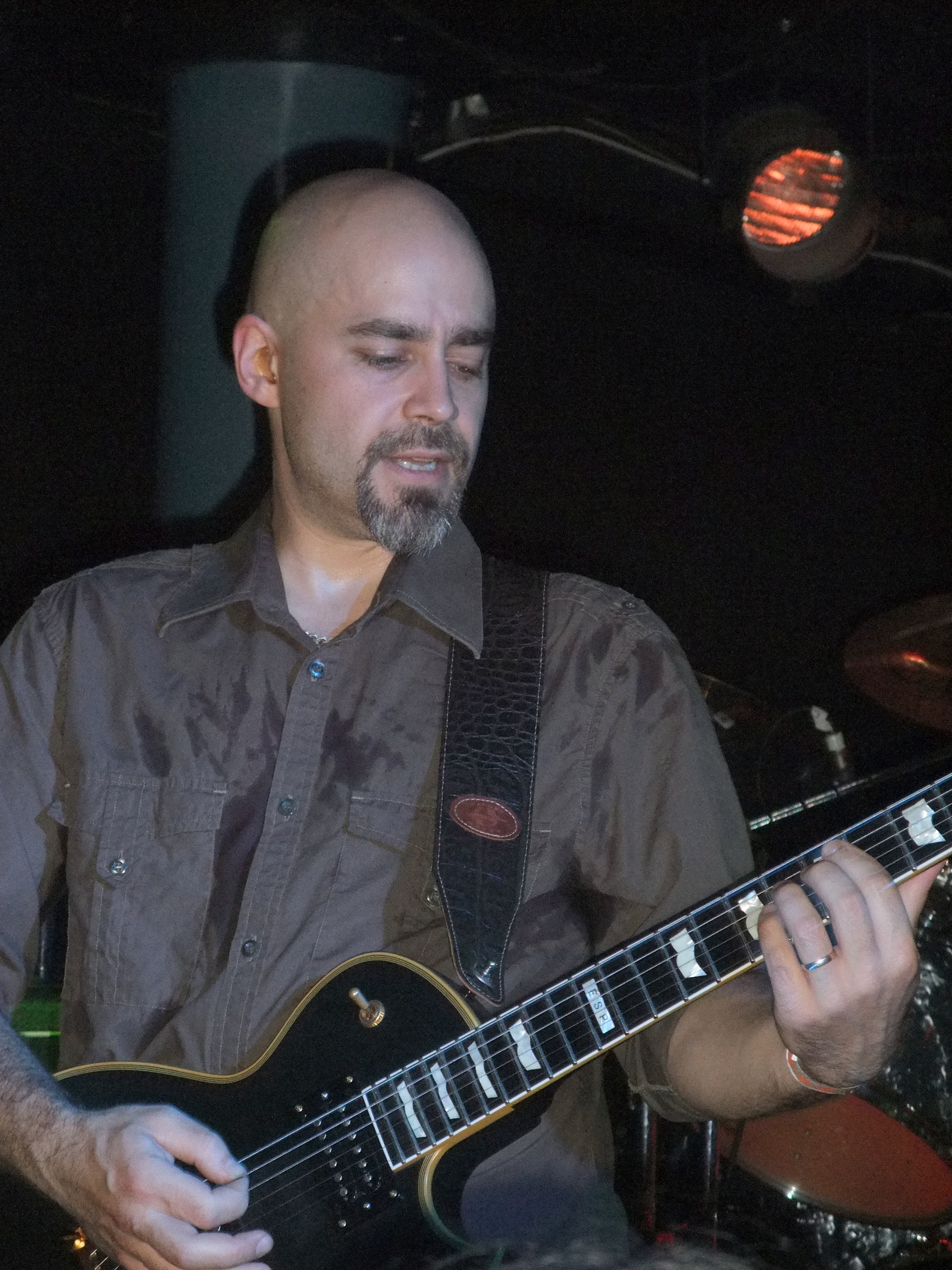
Stefan Weinerhall performing live in 2009

The band added Anders Johansson of Swedish band Vrävarna (not to be confused with the HammerFall drummer of the same name) and Peder Johansson on second guitar and bass, respectively, as live session members, and performed at Wacken Open Air, Rock Machina, and Bang Your Head Festival during the summer. Following these appearances, demand for live performances from the band increased considerably, and vocalist Mathias Blad, who could not commit to touring due to his acting career, agreed to amicably leave the band.

==== Line-up changes ====
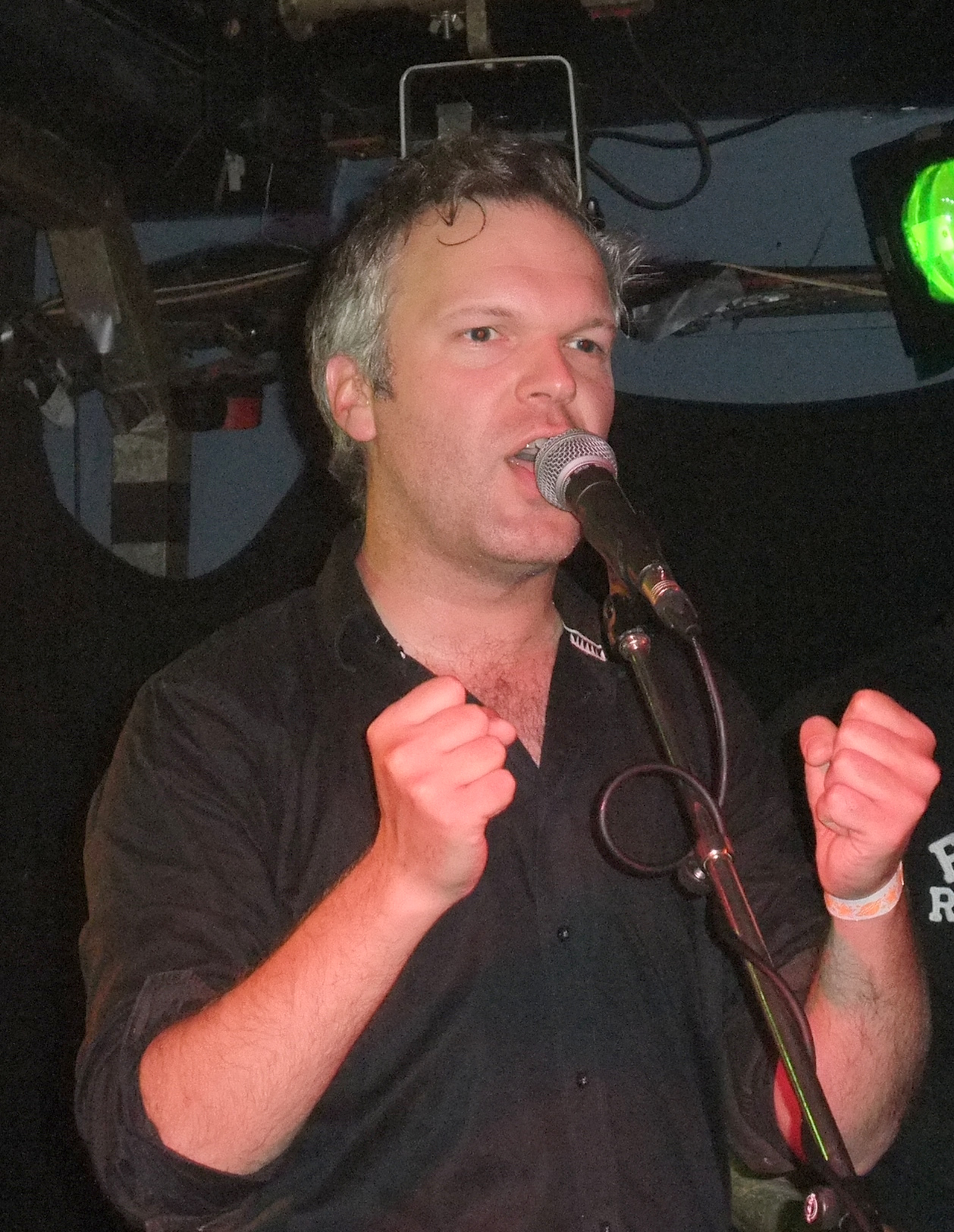
Mathias Blad performing live in 2009

Mathias Blad

Blad is a Swedish actor and singer. was born in Motala. He studied musical-theatre at Balettakademien in Gothenburg between 1989–1992 and trained as an actor at the London Academy of Music and Dramatic Art between 1996 and 1999. He has worked extensively in Swedish theatre since 1992, where his work included playing Peter in Jesus Christ Superstar at the Gothenburg Opera, Claude in Hair in Malmö, and Action in West Side Story at Värmlandsoperan. In 2018, he performed the role of Tempest in the Swedish musical recording of Tivolisaga, a musical by Johan Christher Schütz and Johan Pettersson based on Shakespeare's Romeo and Juliet.

In 1999 Blad recorded demo vocals of the former Mithotyn guitarist, Stefan Weinerhall. After Weinerhall's Falconer project was signed by Metal Blade Records, he agreed to stay on as a full-time member. Since Falconer was a studio band comprising only three members, there was no danger of touring opportunities clashing with his theatre work. This situation changed in 2002 when an expanded Falconer—now a fully rounded band of five people—were offered touring slots that the rest of the members wanted to pursue. At that time, Mathias amicably agreed to leave the band, having performed on two studio albums with them. After two albums with vocalist Göbel filling in, Weinerhall and drummer Karsten Larsson decided to approach Blad about a return to Falconer, which he agreed to. The band has since stated that live appearances may be infrequent due to Blad's theatre commitments.

Kristoffer Göbel

In November 2002, Karl Kristoffer Göbel (Swedish vocalist for Destiny) had been added to the line-up replacing Blad. Göbel was fired from the band before 2005 to make way for the returning Blad. He has since started a new band, Metal Für Alle, along with Snowy Shaw and his former Destiny bandmate Mikael Åberg.

Other changes

Falconer returned to Los Angered to record The Sceptre of Deception, a concept album that, according to the band, is a mix between the two previous albums, but with some more unexpected turns in the music. The album featured multiple guest appearances, including backing vocals from former vocalist Mathias Blad and future Amaranthe vocalist Elize Ryd, as well as lead guitars from Andy LaRocque on the track "Hear Me Pray." It was released on 6 October 2003.

Following the release of the album, internal difficulties brought on by problems with scheduling rehearsals arose within the band and both Anders and Peder Johansson were removed from the line-up. They were eventually replaced with Jimmy Hedlund and Magnus Linhardt, respectively. With this new line-up in place, Falconer recorded Grime vs. Grandeur, a record that departed quite significantly from their established sound by replacing the folk melodies, themes, and lyrics with more traditional heavy metal arrangements. The album received a generally muted response from fans as the band were seen to have lost their somewhat unusual identity.

=== Return to the roots ===
In November 2005, Göbel announced via the Falconer forum that he had been fired and that Mathias Blad had been re-hired in an effort to return to the band's original sound. Recordings took place over the course of 2006, and a new album entitled Northwind was released in September of that year.

In an announcement on the official website on 21 April 2007, Stefan announced that Falconer had extended their deal with Metal Blade for four more albums. The album Among Beggars And Thieves was released in September 2008.

Armod was released on 3 June 2011. The album's songs are all in Swedish. According to Weinerhall, "The album is embracing the Swedish folk music to a greater extent than before making it sound slightly more down to earth. The music spans from acoustic songs with cello, flute and fiddle to songs with blast beats and really heavy riffing."

The following album, Black Moon Rising, was announced on 15 December 2013. It was revealed to be completed on 16 March 2014 and the album art and track listing were revealed one month later, on 16 April 2014.

In 2020, the band announced what would be their final album release prior to ultimately disbanding the band, From a Dying Ember. The band wanted to make this final album "as good as we possibly could and really concentrate on having all Falconer elements present".

== Band members ==
Final lineup

- Mathias Blad – vocals (1999–2002, 2005–2020), keyboards (1999–2002)
- Stefan Weinerhall – rhythm and lead guitar, backing vocals (1999–2020), keyboards (2002–2020), bass (1999–2002)
- Karsten Larsson – drums (1999–2020)
- Jimmy Hedlund – lead guitar, backing vocals (2004–2020)
- Magnus Linhardt – bass (2004–2020)

Former members

- Kristoffer Göbel – vocals (2002–2005)
- Anders Johansson – lead guitar (2002–2004)
- Peder Johansson – bass (2002–2003)

== Discography ==
- Falconer (2001)
- Chapters from a Vale Forlorn (2002)
- The Sceptre of Deception (2003)
- Grime vs. Grandeur (2005)
- Northwind (2006)
- Among Beggars and Thieves (2008)
- Armod (2011)
- Black Moon Rising (2014)
- From a Dying Ember (2020)
