= List of Swedish films of the 1980s =

This is a list of films produced in Sweden and in the Swedish language in the 1980s.

== 1980s ==
Swedish title	English title	Director	Cast	Genre	Notes
1980
Barnens ö	Children's Island	Kay Pollak			Entered into the 31st Berlin International Film Festival
Marmeladupproret	Marmalade Revolution	Erland Josephson			Entered into the 30th Berlin International Film Festival
Sällskapsresan		Lasse Åberg	Lasse Åberg	Comedy	Entered into the 12th Moscow International Film Festival
1981
Montenegro eller Pärlor och Svin	Montenegro	Dušan Makavejev			Entered into the 1981 Cannes Film Festival
Den enfaldige mördaren	The Simple-Minded Murderer	Hasse Alfredson	Stellan Skarsgård		Entered into the 32nd Berlin International Film Festival
1982
Fanny och Alexander	Fanny and Alexander	Ingmar Bergman			Won four Academy Awards including Best Foreign Language Film, 1983; won Golden Globe Award for Best Foreign Film
Ingenjör Andrées luftfärd	Flight of the Eagle	Jan Troell		Drama	Swedish submission for Best Foreign Language Film at the 55th Academy Awards
Målaren	The Painter	Göran du Rées			Entered into the 13th Moscow International Film Festival
Den enfaldige mördaren	The Simple-Minded Murderer	Hans Alfredson	Stellan Skarsgård, Maria Johansson, Hans Alfredson	Drama	
1983
G - som i gemenskap		Staffan Hildebrand	Niclas Wahlgren, Magnus Uggla		
1984
Åke och hans värld	Åke and His World	Allan Edwall			Entered into the 14th Moscow International Film Festival
Efter repetitionen	After the Rehearsal	Ingmar Bergman			Screened at the 1984 Cannes Film Festival
Mannen från Mallorca	The Man from Majorca	Bo Widerberg	Sven Wollter	Thriller	Based on the novel Grisfesten by Leif G. W. Persson
Misja ninja	The Ninja Mission	Mats Helge	Krzysztof Kolberger	Action	
Ronja Rövardotter	Ronia, the Robber's Daughter	Tage Danielsson			Based on the novel by Astrid Lindgren, entered into Berlin
1985
Mitt liv som hund	My Life as a Dog	Lasse Hallström			Nominated for two Academy Awards; won Golden Globe Award for Best Foreign Language Film, 1987
Sällskapsresan 2 - Snowroller		Lasse Åberg	Lasse Åberg		
1986
Amorosa	Amorosa	Mai Zetterling	Stina Ekblad, Erland Josephson	Drama	
Älska mej	Love Me!	Kay Pollak			Entered into the 36th Berlin International Film Festival
Gröna gubbar från Y.R.		Hans Hatwig		Sci-fi	
Morrhår & ärtor	Peas and Whiskers	Gösta Ekman		Comedy	
Offret	The Sacrifice	Andrei Tarkovsky		Drama	Won two awards at the 1986 Cannes Film Festival
Ormens väg på hälleberget	The Serpent's Way	Bo Widerberg			Screened at Cannes and Moscow
1987
Kuoleman kumppani	The Girl	Arne Mattsson	Franco Nero, Bernice Stegers, Christopher Lee	Drama	
Leif		Claes Eriksson	Galenskaparna och After Shave	Comedy	
Mio min Mio	Mio in the Land of Faraway	Vladimir Grammatikov	Christopher Lee, Christian Bale	Fantasy	
Pelle Erövraren	Pelle the Conqueror	Bille August	Max von Sydow	Drama	Palme d'Or at 1988 Cannes Film Festival
1988
	The New Adventures of Pippi Longstocking	Ken Annakin	Tami Erin, David Seaman Jr.	Fantasy	
S.O.S. - En segelsällskapsresa		Lasse Åberg	Lasse Åberg		
1989
Erik Viking	Erik the Viking	Terry Jones	Tim Robbins, Terry Jones, Eartha Kitt, Mickey Rooney, Tsutomu Sekine, John Cleese, Antony Sher, Imogen Stubbs	Comedy-fantasy	
Kvinnorna på taket	The Women on the Roof	Carl-Gustav Nykvist			Entered into the 1989 Cannes Film Festival
