= List of Swedish films of the 1990s =

This is a list of films produced in Sweden and in the Swedish language in the 1990s.

== 1990s ==
Swedish title	English title	Director	Cast	Genre	Notes
1990
God afton, Herr Wallenberg	Good Evening, Mr. Wallenberg	Kjell Grede			Entered into the 41st Berlin International Film Festival
1991
Den ofrivillige golfaren	The Accidental Golfer / The Involuntary Golfer	Lasse Åberg	Lasse Åberg		
Oxen	The Ox	Sven Nykvist			Nominated for an Academy Award, screened at Cannes
Il Capitano	Il Capitano: A Swedish Requiem	Jan Troell			Troell won the Silver Bear for Best Director at Berlin.
1992
Den goda viljan	The Best Intentions	Bille August			Won the Palme d'Or at Cannes
Änglagård	House of Angels	Colin Nutley			Screened at the 1992 Cannes Film Festival
1993
Drömkåken	The Dream House	Peter Dalle	Björn Skifs, Suzanne Reuter, Pierre Lindstedt		Highest grossing Swedish film of the year
Kådisbellan	The Slingshot	Åke Sandgren	Stellan Skarsgård		
Tala! Det är så mörkt	Speak Up! It's So Dark	Suzanne Osten	Etienne Glaser, Simon Norrthon		
1995
Lust och fägring stor	All Things Fair	Bo Widerberg			Won the Jury Prize in Berlin
Bert – den siste oskulden	Bert: The Last Virgin	Tomas Alfredson	Martin Andersson		
	Sebastian	Svend Wam	Hampus Bjorck	Drama	
Tag ditt liv	A Life for the Taking	Göran du Rées			Entered into the 19th Moscow International Film Festival
1996
Enskilda samtal	Private Confessions	Liv Ullmann			Screened at the 1997 Cannes Film Festival
Jerusalem		Bille August			
Jägarna	The Hunters	Kjell Sundvall	Rolf Lassgård	Crime	
1997
9 millimeter		Peter Lindmark	Paolo Roberto	Drama	
Evil Ed		Anders Jacobsson		Horror	
Larmar och gör sig till	In the Presence of a Clown	Ingmar Bergman			Screened at the 1998 Cannes Film Festival
Sense of Snow	Smilla's Sense of Snow			Drama / thriller	
Pippi Longstocking	Pippi Longstocking	Clive A. Smith	Melissa Altro, Catherine O'Hara	Animated	
1998
Fucking Åmål	Show Me Love	Lukas Moodysson			Notable treatment of lesbianism. Released in several countries. Won several international awards, including the Teddy award at the 1999 Berlin Film Festival.
Sista kontraktet	The Last Contract	Kjell Sundvall		Thriller / crime	
1999
Hälsoresan		Lasse Åberg	Lasse Åberg		
