= One-Week Bachelors =

- Directed by: Hans Iveberg
- Written by: Åke Cato; Jan Richter
- Produced by: Peter Hald
- Starring: Gösta Ekman; Janne Carlsson; Lena Olin; Mona Seilitz; Svante Grundberg
- Cinematography: Petter Davidson
- Edited by: Roger Sellberg; Sten Valegren
- Music by: Björn J:son Lindh
- Production companies: Drakfilm Produktion; Europa Film
- Release date: 16 December 1982
- Running time: 99 minutes
- Country: Sweden
- Language: Swedish

One-Week Bachelors (Swedish: Gräsänklingar) is a Swedish comedy film from 1982, directed by Hans Iveberg. The film premiered in theaters on December 16, 1982.

== Plot ==
The architect Gary Stenström is at Arlanda and has just waved off his wife who is going to Geneva for a conference. After the airbus has driven him out, he gets picked up by car mechanic Lasse, who is Gary's complete opposite. Gary's plans to have a quiet week in a grassland change radically and he is experiencing a whole new world with Lasse.

== Cast ==
- Gösta Ekman as Gary
- Janne Carlsson as Lasse
- Lena Olin as Nina
- Mona Seilitz as Inga-Lill
- Lis Nilheim as Lilian
- Peter Harryson as Göran
- Lennart R. Svensson as Rune
- Lena Nyman as Maggan
- Marika Lindström as Viveka
- Svante Grundberg as Staffan
- Börje Nyberg as Brogren
- Stig Ossian Ericson as Hypnotist
- Johannes Brost as Bank robber
- Claire Wikholm as Secretary
- Roland Janson as policeman
- Michael Segerström as policeman
- Peter Schildt as policeman
- Ann-Sofie Kylin as Anki
- Kim Anderzon as hypnosis lady
- Marvin Yxner as hypnosis man
- Åsa Bjerkerot as Mia
- Nils Eklund as Mia's father
- Gregor Dahlman as taxi driver
- Palle Granditsky as Mayor
- Joel Fänge as August Carlsson
- Christina Lindberg as stripper
- Gunwer Bergkvist as Lady with pram
- Luc Bouy as restaurant employee
