= List of Swedish films =

This is a chronological list of films produced in Sweden and in the Swedish language in alphabetical order ordered by decade of release on separate pages.

- List of Swedish films of the 1910s
- List of Swedish films of the 1920s
- List of Swedish films of the 1930s
- List of Swedish films of the 1940s
- List of Swedish films of the 1950s
- List of Swedish films of the 1960s
- List of Swedish films of the 1970s
- List of Swedish films of the 1980s
- List of Swedish films of the 1990s
- List of Swedish films of the 2000s
- List of Swedish films of the 2010s
- List of Swedish films of the 2020s
