= Lottie Ejebrant =

Swedish actress

Lottie Ejebrant (real name Gunhild Ejebrant, born 17 May 1944) is a Swedish actress. She has been married to Gunnar Edander.

Ejebrant started the theatrical organization Fickteatern in 1968 together with Suzanne Osten, Leif Sundberg and Gunnar Edander.

In 1998 Ejebrant received the Guldmasken Award for her appearance in Spanska Flugan at Intiman. Her last theatre-appearance was in Erland Josephson's play Blomsterplockarna at the Royal Dramatic Theatre in 2006/2007.

== Selected filmography ==
- 2013 - Crimes of Passion (TV)
- 2007 - Leende guldbruna ögon (TV)
- 2001 - Nya tider (TV)
- 1995 - Anmäld försvunnen (TV)
- 1993 - Allis med is (TV)
- 1991 - Freud flyttar hemifrån...
- 1986 - The Brothers Mozart
- 1986 - Vägg i vägg (TV)
- 1986 - Saxofonhallicken
- 1981 - Rasmus på luffen
- 1980 - Sällskapsresan
- 1980 - Räkan från Maxim (TV)
- 1979 - Repmånad
- 1973 - Jul i Mumindalen (TV)
- 1972 - Vem älskar Yngve Frej?
