= Jon Skolmen =

Norwegian actor and comedian (1940–2019)

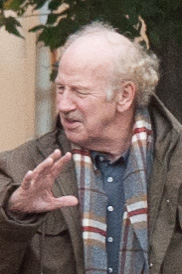
- Jon Skolmen, September 2010
- Born: 1 November 1940; Oslo, Norway
- Died: 28 March 2019 (aged 78); Oslo, Norway
- Occupations: Actor, comedian
- Years active: 1963–2019

Jon Skolmen (1 November 1940 – 28 March 2019) was a Norwegian actor and comedian who appeared in several Norwegian and Swedish films. He gained special recognition for his role as Ole Bramserud in Sällskapsresan (1980) opposite Lasse Åberg.

== Career ==
Between 1963 and 1981, Skolmen was employed by the Norwegian state broadcasting company, NRK, where he most notably co-wrote and appeared in the show The Nor-Way to Broadcasting alongside Trond Kirkvaag. The show won the Golden Rose of Montreux and the Chaplin Award at the Montreux Television Festival in 1976.

He also appeared on British children's television. In 1971, he presented Play School for the BBC, though for only one week. He was also a regular presenter on the programme's Norwegian version, Lekestue. In 1981, he appeared in a one-off special co-produced by the BBC and NRK called Jon, Brian, Kirsti and Jon in which he appeared with his compatriot Kirsti Sparboe, and the British performers Brian Cant (with whom Skolmen co-wrote the script) and Jonathan Cohen.

Skolmen found a large audience in neighbouring Sweden. He co-starred in the six Sällskapsresan films as the character Ole Bramserud, the Norwegian sidekick of main character Stig-Helmer Olsson who was played by Swedish actor Lasse Åberg. In the 1980s, he also co-starred in the Swedish sketch comedy show Nöjesmassakern, which was broadcast on SVT.

In 2007, Skolmen again collaborated with his former partner Trond Kirkvaag, when he starred in the sitcom Luftens helter, which was created shortly before Kirkvaag's death the same year.

Skolmen received the Komiprisen honorary prize for lifetime achievement in 2009.

== Personal life and death ==
Skolmen was the father of actors Christian and Tine Skolmen, brother of director Eli Skolmen Ryg and uncle of actors Anne Ryg and Hege Schøyen. He acted alongside Schøyen in the 1991 Swedish comedy film Den ofrivillige golfaren.

He died on 28 March 2019 at the age of 78.

== Filmography ==
- 1980: Sällskapsresan as Ole Bramserud
- 1981: Sølvmunn as Father
- 1984: ...But the Olsen Gang Wasn't Dead as Vaktmesteren på Munchmuseet
- 1985: Sällskapsresan 2 – Snowroller as Ole
- 1986: Plastposen as Reinert
- 1988: Folk og røvere i Kardemomme by as Butcher
- 1988: S.O.S. – En segelsällskapsresa as Ole
- 1991: Den ofrivillige golfaren as Ole Bramserud
- 1993: Minns Ni? (archive footage)
- 1993: Hodet over vannet as Policeman
- 1999: Hälsoresan – En smal film av stor vikt as Ole Bramserud
- 2007: 5 løgner as Ole Gunnar
- 2009: Göta kanal 3 – Kanalkungens hemlighet as Norrman
- 2011: Umeå4ever as Far
- 2011: The Stig-Helmer Story as Ole Bramserud
