= Mats Bergman =

Swedish actor

- Born: 5 May 1948 (age 78); Gothenburg, Sweden
- Education: Swedish National Academy of Mime and Acting (1971)
- Parent(s): Ingmar Bergman; Ellen Lundström
- Relatives: Anna Bergman (twin sister); Eva Bergman (sister); Lena Bergman (paternal half-sister); Daniel Bergman (paternal half-brother); Linn Ullmann (paternal half-sister)

Mats Bergman (born 5 May 1948) is a Swedish actor.

He is the son of director Ingmar Bergman and Ellen Lundström, twin brother of actress Anna Bergman, and a half-brother of Swedish-Norwegian author Linn Ullmann.

== Biography ==
Bergman graduated from Sweden's National Theatre Academy (Scenskolan) in Stockholm in 1971. Since 1987, he has been a stage actor at Sweden's Royal Dramatic Theatre, and has also appeared at Stockholm City Theatre and Norrbottensteatern. He has acted in Almqvist's Drottningens juvelsmycke, Bulgakov's Mästaren och Margarita (The Master and Margarita), Brecht's Tolvskillingsoperan (The Threepenny Opera), Botho Strauss' Rummet och tiden, Molière's Misantropen (Le Misanthrope) and Brecht's Den goda människan i Sezuan (The Good Person of Szechwan). He has also performed frequently in theatre productions for children, most recently in the adaptation of Elsa Beskow's children's story Petter och Lotta på stora landsvägen (2005 and 2006).

Bergman has gained a reputation as a character actor. He has appeared in television and film roles in a number of well-known productions, including as Aron in Fanny and Alexander, and as a cigar-loving salesman in Kan du vissla Johanna? (1994), traditionally shown each Christmas Eve in Sweden. He has also played the antique expert Erik Johansson in TV series Berlinder auktioner (2003) and a teacher in the acclaimed Swedish psychological drama film Ondskan (Evil), also in 2003.

More recently he has been playing the dry-witted forensic detective Nyberg in the Swedish crime films about Det. Insp. Kurt Wallander, with Krister Henriksson in the lead (32 episodes).

== Selected filmography ==
- 1981 - Drottning Kristina (Queen Kristina) (TV-theatre)
- 1982 - Fanny och Alexander
- 1987 - Träff i helfigur
- 1988 - Gull-Pian
- 1989 - Vildanden (aka Ibsen's The Wild Duck) (TV-theatre)
- 1989 - 1939
- 1991 - Den ofrivillige golfaren
- 1992 - En komikers uppväxt (TV-series)
- 1994 - Kan du vissla Johanna?
- 1996 - Monopol
- 1999 - Hälsoresan – En smal film av stor vikt
- 2000 - Födelsedagen
- 2003 - Berlinder auktioner (TV-series)
- 2003 - Ondskan
- 2004 - Danslärarens återkomst (TV)
- 2005–2013 - Wallander (as Nyberg)
