= Trazan & Banarne =

- Created by: Lasse Åberg
- Starring: Klasse Möllberg, Ted Åström
- Composer: Electric Banana Band
- Country of origin: Sweden
- Original language: Swedish

Original release
- Network: Sveriges Television
- Release: 1976 (Sweden) – 1982 (Sweden)

Trazan & Banarne was a Swedish children's television series which was broadcast from 1976 to 1982 on Sveriges Television. For its first season from 1976 to 1977, it was part of the Jullovsmorgon series. The title characters were played by Lasse Åberg (Trazan Apansson) and Klasse Möllberg (Banarne), and they recorded many songs together with the band Electric Banana Band.

The TV series also broadcast TV series such as Lucky Luke.

== Plot ==
The friends Trazan Apansson and Banarne live in a tree house in the jungle with a trampoline. Trazan is a person based on Tarzan and Banarne is a monkey. Generally they have bananas as food. They often tell stories to each other and discuss figures such as the Phantom. They also sing songs by Povel Ramel, Lennart Hellsing and Hans Alfredson. Trazan plays banjo and Banarne plays guitar.

They are also visited a few times by the stunt man Johan Thorén.

They also go on trips to Toy Museum Stockholm.

=== Olyckan ===
In 1980 the TV series was produced together with Swedish Road Administration ("Road Traffic Safety Administration"). Then the character Olyckan ("The Accident") (played by Ted Åström) appeared. He was a character who liked when Banarne made mistakes while driving, but Trazan told Banarne how to drive carefully without accidents.

=== Pulver & Nicko ===
Nicko (Klasse Möllberg) and Pulver (Lasse Åberg) were the title characters of the sketch series Pulver & Nicko in the TV series. The sketches take place in the countryside where two dirty and hoarse farmers ask each other riddles and when they hear the answers they fall backwards, laughing. For the New Year's Eve program in 1982 they went to London, Paris and New York.

=== Rocktajm ===
Besides the music by Trazan and Banarne, there was a musical segment called Rocktajm where the rock music band Electric Banana Band appeared. Their songs are based on jungles, bananas, wild animals and Tarzan.

== Media ==
=== Albums ===
- 1977 - Sångtajm med Trazan och Banarne
- 1978 - E' bananerna fina?!
- 1979 - Djungelmums
- 1983 - Banantårta och tigerkaka
- 1999 - Trazan & Banarnes bäzta! (compilation)
- 2005 - Electric Banana Bands och Trazan & Banarnes bästa (compilation)
- 2006 - Det bästa med Trazan & Banarne (compilation)
- 2008 - Swingtajm!:Trazan och Banarnes 30-års skiva (compilation)
- 2009 - Three original album classics, reissue of the albums Sångtajm med Trazan och Banarne, E' bananerna fina?! and Djungelmums

=== Film-TV ===
- 1976-1978 - Trazan & Banarne
- 1980 - Trazan Apansson & Banarne
- 1980 - Trazan Apansson-E' bananerna fina?
- 1980 - Trazan Apansson-Djungelmums
- 1981 - Biotajm med Trazan & Banarne
- 1982 - Videotajm med Trazan & Banarne
- 1998 - Electric Banana Band the Movie - djungelns kojigaste rulle
