= Cluedo – en mordgåta =

1996 Swedish TV game show

- Genre: Whodunnit gameshow
- Presented by: Martin Timell
- Country of origin: Sweden
- Original language: Swedish
- No. of seasons: 2
- No. of episodes: 12

Production
- Running time: about 60 minutes
- Production company: Wegelius Television

Original release
- Network: TV4
- Release: 22 January – 9 December 1996

Cluedo – en mordgåta [sv] is a Swedish gameshow which lasted for two seasons in 1996. It is an adaption of the British gameshow Cluedo adapted from the board game of the same name. It aired on TV4 during the spring and autumn of 1996. The two seasons had six episodes each. The presenter was Martin Timell, who turned to the show after "Vad är det du säger?" and "Trodde du ja!" after he left SVT forTV4. Each episode was aired in two parts on the same night, from 8-8:30pm and 8:35-8:50pm with a five minute program in-between. There was sometimes a five minute program called Inför Cluedo (Before Cluedo).

== Production ==
The murders occurred at the Döinge hus (Dead House), while the storylines were written by Hans Alfredson and Rickard Bergquist. The location shots were filmed at "Sturehov Slott", which is 19 km from Stockholm. Similar to the Australian series, Criminal Inspector Bert appears in the prerecorded footage to help provide further evidence. The audience tried to guess the correct solution and played for a trip for two to England.

== Plot and gameplay ==
A murder has been committed and during the course of the program it will be revealed who the murderer is at Döinge Hus. Countess von Thän, Miss Anette Gulling, Colonel Douglas Olsson, associate professor John Plommongren, pastor Seved Fillén and housekeeper Siv Holm are all suspects. Which murder weapon was used and in which room of the castle did the murder take place? Commissioner Bert Berg will try to solve the murder mystery. The suspects are also questioned by the audience. Who is really telling the truth and who has reason to lie?

== Critical reception ==
Daniel Hånberg Alonso of Filmkultur remembered the single series Swedish version as "very entertaining". Villanytt asked, "who doesn't remember" Cluedo. Citisenior deemed the series "successful". In 2015, TV4 advised they had no intention of re-running the series.

== Episodes ==
No. in series	Title	Synopsis	Solution	Original release date	Production notes
1	"Reporter till salu (Reporter for sale)"	Reporter Anders Mörvell (Kjell Bergqvist) is murdered while uncovering secrets at Döinge Hus	Colonel Mustard with the revolver in the library.	January 22, 1996	Rerun January 27, 1996. Adapted from Australian episode "Poison Pen" (S2E5).
2	"Lisa Spiis"	Celebrity chef Lisa Spiis, played by Birgitta Andersson, is murdered at Döinge Hus.	Mrs White with the poison phial in the kitchen	January 29, 1996	Rerun February 3, 1996 Adapted from Australian episode "Red Herring" (S2E2) with a slightly different solution.
3	"Skattmasen lever farligt (The tax collector lives dangerously)"	Tax collector Johan Gridlund (Lakke Magnusson) is murdered while a guest at Döinge Hus.	Mrs Peacock with the swordfish in the library	February 5, 1996	Rerun February 10, 1996. Adapted from Australian episode "Death And Taxes" (S2E12) with a slightly different solution.
4	"Slaktarens återkomst (The return of the butcher)"	Butcher Manfred Jönsemyr (Janne Carlsson) is murdered upon visiting Döinge Hus.	Colonel Mustard with the wheel brace in the lounge	February 26, 1996	Rerun on March 2, 1996. Adapted from Australian episode "Where There’s A Will" (S2E4).
5	"Mediernas makt (The power of the medium)"	Döinge Hus is visited by the fortune teller Madame Rosamunda (Jessica Zandén).	Reverend Green with the native club in library.	March 4, 1996	Rerun on March 9, 1996. Adapted from Australian episode "Madame Rosamonda" (S1E6).
6	"Skriket (The scream)"	Art connoisseur Oddvar B. Hanssen (Anker Ousdal) visits Döinge Hus and gets into trouble.	TBA	March 11, 1996.	Rerun on March 16, 1996. Adapted from British episode "Going, Going, Goner" (S1E4).
7	"Nyfiken i en strut (Curiosity killed the cat)"	Genealogist and relative Linda Hamilton-Gulling (Kim Anderzon) comes to Döinge Hus.	TBA	November 4, 1996	Adapted from Australian episode "Busy Body" (S2E1).
8	"Dödligt svek (Deadly Betrayal)"	A stock trader, Konrad Kison Klipp, played by Peter Harryson, comes to visit Döinge Hus.	TBA	November 11, 1996	TBA
9	"En sista kyss (One Last Kiss)"	Roger Drüg (Göran Gillinger), bodybuilder and Buddhist, comes to visit Döinge Hus.	TBA	November 18, 1996	Adapted from Australian episode "A Body To Die For" (S1E11).
10	"Det kortaste strået (The shortest straw)"	Hairstylist Camilla Strååt (Eva Röse) loses her life at Döinge Hus.	TBA	November 25, 1996.	Adapted from Australian episode "A Brush With Death" (S2E2).
11	"Farliga kontakter (Dangerous liaison)"	The electrician Jesper Ström (Jakob Eklund) loses his life.	TBA	December 2, 1996	Adapted from Australian episode "Sparks" (S2E6).
12	"Dödligt frieri (Deadly Courtship)"	Allan Svensson plays the politician Carl Ingvar Kolfvén, whose life is extinguished when he arrives at Döinge Hus	TBA	December 9, 1996	Series finale. Adapted from Australian episode "The First Lady" (S1E8).

== Cast ==
- Grynet Molvig – Grevinnan Margareta von Thän (Mrs. Peacock)
- Gunvor Pontén – Hushållerskan Siv Holm (Mrs. White)
- Peder Falk – Overste Douglas Olsson (Colonel Mustard)
- Reuben Sallmander – Docent John Plommongren (Professor Plum)
- Mi Ridell – Fröken Anette Gulling (Miss Scarlett)
- Helge Skoog – Pastor Seved Fillén (Reverend Green)
- Rolf Skoglund – Kommissarie Bert Berg (Detective Sergeant Stanley Bogong)

=== Guest roles ===
Kjell Bergqvist, Birgitta Andersson, Lakke Magnusson, Janne Carlsson, Jessica Zandén, Kim Anderzon, Peter Harrysson, Göran Gillinger, Eva Röse, Jakob Eklund and Allan Svensson .
