= Ann-Mari Adamsson =

Swedish actress (1934–2011)

- Born: 22 January 1934; Skee, Sweden
- Died: 21 December 2011 (77 years old)
- Occupation: actor
- Years active: 1950s-1960s

Signe Ann-Mari Adamsson (22 January 1934 – 21 December 2011) was a Swedish actress. She was born in Skee, Sweden, and her career lasted from the early 1950s until the late 1980s.

== Filmography ==
Year	Title	Role	Notes
1954	Salka Valka	Guja	
1958	Åsa-Nisse in Military Uniform	Ulla	
1959	Fridolfs farliga ålder	TV Presenter	Uncredited
1959	Sköna Susanna och gubbarna		
1961	Karneval	Birgitta	
1967	Roseanna	Martin Becks fru	
1968	Vindingevals	Debora	
1968	Farbror Blås nya båt	Mrs. Karlsson	
1973	Stenansiktet	Eva Berg	
1974	Vita Nejlikan	Rich Lady 3	
1976	Polare	Kent's Co-worker	
1981	Syöksykierre	Rich Girl's Mother	
1983	One-Week Bachelors	Äldre kvinna	Uncredited, (final film role)
