= Klasses julkalender =

- Directed by: Jesper Aspegren
- Starring: Klasse Möllberg; Lasse Åberg
- Theme music composer: Janne Schaffer
- Country of origin: Sweden
- Original language: Swedish

Production
- Producer: Marie Finnson

Original release
- Release: November 29 – December 25, 1992

Related
- Sunes jul (1991); Tomtemaskinen (1993)

Klasses julkalender (English: Klasse's Christmas calendar) is a Swedish children's television series, broadcast as SVT's Christmas calendar on Sveriges Television from November 29 to December 25, 1992. The series followed Klasse Möllberg who lived in a little hut in the tallest spruce of the Swedish forest and had Christmas fun.

== Cast ==
- Lasse Åberg
- Pernilla Wiberg
- Janne Schaffer
- Kalle Moraeus
- After Shave
- Anders Eriksson
- Anders Berglund
- Björn Skifs
- Ingemar Stenmark
- Charlie Norman
- Roger Tallroth
- Anders Forsslund
- Bortalaget
- Highway Stars
- Kalypsoorkestern
