= Janne Carlsson =

Swedish actor

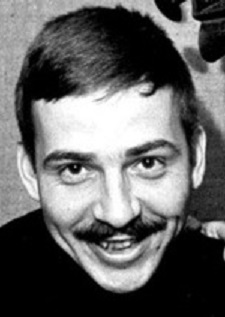
- Carlsson in 1964
- Born: Jan Edvard Carlsson; 12 March 1937; Stockholm, Sweden
- Died: 31 August 2017 (aged 80); Kristianstad, Sweden
- Occupations: Actor; musician; composer; artist
- Years active: 1950–2017
- Spouse: Eva Ljungdahl (m. 1969; div. 1988)
- Partner: Gurianne Sandven
- Children: 1
- Relatives: Erik Carlsson (father); Tyra Törnkvist (mother)
- Awards: H. M. The King's Medal

Jan Edvard Carlsson (12 March 1937 – 31 August 2017), known professionally as Janne 'Loffe' Carlsson, was a Swedish actor, musician, composer and artist.

== Early life ==
Carlsson was born on 12 March 1937 in Katarina Parish, Stockholm, the son of Erik Carlsson (1893–1953) and Tyra Törnkvist (1901–1981). His older brother, Leopold Fare (1926–1996), was an artist. He also had one sister, Gerd Carlsson. Carlsson was the uncle of Michael Fare and paternal uncle of Pär Isberg.

== Career ==
Carlsson's debut as an actor came in 1950. He is perhaps most famous for his roles in the comedies Repmånad (1979) and Göta kanal eller Vem drog ur proppen? (1981). Carlsson is also well known for playing lead roles in several film adaptations of the Swedish writer Stig Claesson's books, such as Vem älskar Yngve Frej (1973), På palmblad och rosor (1976) and Henrietta (1983).

Carlsson was also a skilled drummer and featured on several albums of the 1960s, 1970s and 1980s, notably for fellow Swede Doris on the album Did you give the world some love today Baby. He was the 'Karlsson' of the Swedish jazz fusion/psychedelic rock duo Hansson & Karlsson that were active in the late 1960s, and performed together with musicians such as Dexter Gordon, Johnny Griffin and Jimi Hendrix.

== Personal life ==
Carlson was from 1969 to 1988 married to the artist Eva Ljungdahl (born 1946). He was then in a relationship with Gurianne Sandven (born 1960).

Carlsson had daughter Sara with Ljungdahl, who was in a relationship and had two children with Peter Settman.

== Death ==
Carlsson died of liver cancer on 31 August 2017 in Kristianstad at the age of 80. The funeral service was held on 25 September 2017 in Katarina Church in Södermalm, Stockholm. Among the funeral guests were Lill-Babs, Per Ragnar, Johan Hedenberg, Christian Lundqvist, Bert-Åke Varg, and Joakim Nätterqvist.

== Filmography ==
=== Film ===
| Year | Title | Role | Notes |
|---|---|---|---|
| 1950 | Anderssonskans Kalle | —N/a | |
| 1956 | På heder och skoj | —N/a | |
| 1970 | Blushing Charlie | Himself | |
| 1970 | Sven Arvid är död | —N/a | Short film |
| 1971 | Exponerad | —N/a | |
| 1971 | 47:an Löken | 69:an | |
| 1971 | Niklas och Figuren | Farm-worker | |
| 1972 | 47:an Löken blåser på | 69:an | |
| 1974 | The Last Adventure | Radiovoice | |
| 1974 | Världens bästa Karlsson | Fille | |
| 1975 | Maria | Rikard | |
| 1976 | Drömmen om Amerika : En film om Hjert och Tector | Konrad Petterson Lundqvist Tector | |
| 1979 | Repmånad | Oskar Löfgren | |
| 1980 | Sverige åt svenskarna | Swedish Cavalry Officer | |
| 1981 | Göta kanal eller Vem drog ur proppen? | Janne Andersson | |
| 1982 | One-Week Bachelors | Lasse | |
| 1983 | Henrietta | Gustav Rune Petterson | |
| 1984 | Sköna juveler | Larsson | |
| 1985 | Smugglarkungen | Albert Jansson | |
| 1985 | Svindlande affärer | Rolle Eriksson, Dr. Fredman | |
| 1986 | Transportsadisterna | —N/a | |
| 1989 | Kronvittnet | Axel | |
| 1997 | Svenska hjältar | Viking Larsson | |
| 2001 | Jordgubbar med riktig mjölk | Rolf | |
| 2006 | Små mirakel och stora | Johan | |
| 2006 | God Willing | David | |
| 2006 | Göta kanal 2 – Kanalkampen | Janne Andersson | |
| 2008 | Persona non grata | Sture | |
| 2008 | Rallybrudar | Editor Melin | |
| 2009 | Göta kanal 3 – Kanalkungens hemlighet | Janne Andersson | |

=== Television ===
| Year | Title | Role | Notes |
|---|---|---|---|
| 1973 | Vem älskar Yngve Frej | Nisse Pettersson | |
| 1973 | Någonstans i Sverige | 111:an Elof 'Loffe' Olsson | |
| 1976 | På palmblad och rosor | 'Proppen' Oskarsson | |
| 1979–1980 | Katitzi | Johan Taikon | |
| 1981 | Janne Carlsson Show | Himself (host) | |
| 1981 | Genombrottet | Erik Gyttorp | |
| 1989 | Det var då... | Karl-Otto 'Kotten' Ahlgren | |
| 1990 | Kulan | —N/a | |
| 1991–1997 | Låt kameran gå | Himself (host) | |
| 1993 | Nästa man till rakning | —N/a | |
| 1996 | Vänner och fiender | Himself | |
| 2008 | Stjärnorna på slottet | Himself | |
