= Niels Fredrik Dahl =

Norwegian novelist, poet and dramatist

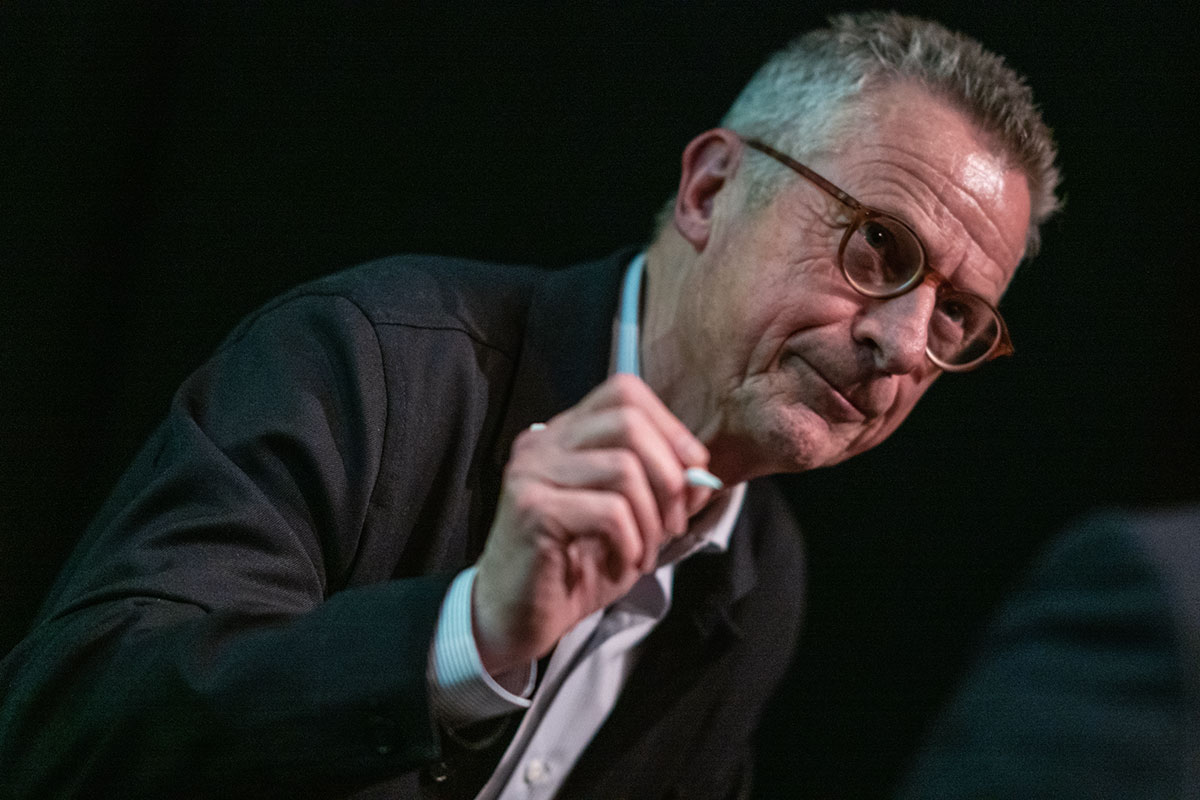
- Born: 11 May 1957 (age 69)
- Education: Journalist studies
- Occupations: Poet, novelist, short story writer, playwright
- Spouse: Linn Ullmann
- Awards: Brage Prize; Norwegian Ibsen Award; Fringe First Award

Niels Fredrik Dahl (born 11 May 1957) is a Norwegian novelist, poet and dramatist. He was awarded the Brage Prize in 2002 for the novel På vei til en venn. He has also written scripts for TV series. Dahl is married to author and journalist Linn Ullmann.

In 2024 he won the Nordic Council Literature Prize for the novel Fars rygg.

== Literary career ==
Dahl made his literary debut in 1988 with the poetry collection I fjor var litt av en natt. His short story collection Fluenes gate (1990) contains stories relating to white people in the third world. In 1991 he issued the collection Dikter i New York, with translations of poetry by Federico García Lorca. His poetry collection Branngater (1992) is influenced by Lorca, Georg Johannesen and surrealism. Antecedentia from 1995 is a collection of poetic prose. His first novel Journalisten (1997) has been characterized as a roman à clef from the media scene in Oslo.

His literary breakthrough was the novel På vei til en venn (2002), which earned him the Brage Prize. The novel Mor om natten (2017) was well received by the critics, and the novel Fars rygg (2023) earned him the Nordic Council Literature Prize.

== Awards ==
- 2002 – Brage Prize
- 2002 – Norwegian Ibsen Award
