= Brink of Life =

1958 film by Ingmar Bergman

- Swedish poster
- Directed by: Ingmar Bergman
- Written by: Ulla Isaksson
- Starring: Eva Dahlbeck; Ingrid Thulin; Bibi Andersson; Barbro Hiort af Ornäs
- Distributed by: Nordisk Tonefilm
- Release date: 31 March 1958
- Running time: 84 minutes
- Country: Sweden
- Language: Swedish

Brink of Life, (Swedish: Nära livet), and known as So Close to Life in the UK, is a 1958 Swedish drama film directed by Ingmar Bergman. At the 1958 Cannes Film Festival, Bergman won the Best Director Award, and Andersson, Dahlbeck, Ornäs and Thulin won the Best Actress Award.

== Plot ==
Cecilia Ellius is admitted to a hospital after she has begun badly bleeding during her third month of pregnancy. She is accompanied by her husband, Anders. Before treatment, Cecilia asks Anders if he truly wants the child; Anders replies it is too late to have the discussion. Cecilia undergoes treatment; when she awakes, she realizes she has had a miscarriage. She tearfully tells hospital staff she had wanted the child but Anders did not, and that she knew the child would not be born with only one loving parent. Anders returns to the hospital, and Cecilia initiates a separation, saying she realized Anders did not truly love her as they arrived at the hospital.

Another patient, Hjördis, was admitted after she began bleeding during pregnancy. She tried to abort, but failed. She's not married or engaged, doesn't want to have the child, and did not tell her strict mother about it. Hospital staff tell her unmarried young mothers in Sweden no longer face the social stigma they once did, and Hjördis can find a house and daycare, but she still has doubts. Encouraged by Nurse Brita she calls her mother, who tells her to come home.

A third patient, Stina Andersson, is overdue in her pregnancy and is excited to have her child. She's convinced she will have a boy and intends to name him after her loving husband Harry, who visits her. She gets castor oil and a glass of beer to speed delivery. Her contractions during labour become increasingly violent and excruciating. She is sedated and suffers a stillbirth. She is traumatized and can barely speak. Dr. Nordlander tells her she and the fetus were healthy, but it wasn't meant to be.

== Cast ==
- Eva Dahlbeck as Stina Andersson
- Ingrid Thulin as Cecilia Ellius
- Bibi Andersson as Hjördis Petterson
- Barbro Hiort af Ornäs as Nurse Brita
- Erland Josephson as Anders Ellius
- Max von Sydow as Harry Andersson
- Gunnar Sjöberg as Dr. Nordlander
- Ann-Marie Gyllenspetz as Counsellor Gran
- Inga Landgré as Greta Ellius

== Reception ==
Brink of Life received generally mixed reviews from critics.

== Censorship ==
When Brink of Life was first released in Italy in 1960 the Committee for the Theatrical Review of the Italian Ministry of Cultural Heritage and Activities rated it as VM16: not suitable for children under 16. In order for the film to be screened publicly, the Committee imposed the removal of the scene in which Stina is in pain due to labour. The reason for the age restriction and removal of the scene cited in the official documents, is that the film was not suitable to the sexual morals of a minor in the Italian society, and the scene was considered to be shocking. The official document number is: 31260, it was signed on 20 April 1960 by Minister Domenico Magrì.
