= Sköna juveler =

- Directed by: Hans Iveberg
- Written by: Hans Iveberg
- Produced by: Peter Hald
- Starring: See below
- Cinematography: Petter Davidson
- Edited by: Roger Sellberg
- Music by: Bengt Palmers
- Release date: 21 September 1984
- Running time: 92 minutes
- Country: Sweden

Sköna juveler is a 1984 Swedish film directed by Hans Iveberg.

== Cast ==
- Lena Nyman as Lee
- Kim Anderzon as Veronika
- Kent Andersson as Martin
- Johannes Brost as Harry Jansson
- Brasse Brännström as Oscar
- Janne 'Loffe' Carlsson as Larsson
- Ernst Günther as Gustav
- Margaretha Krook as Old Woman
- Carl-Gustaf Lindstedt as Boris
- Örjan Ramberg as Jan Asp
- David Wilson as Ben Hudson
- Jan Arrendal as Short man
- Birgit Eggers as Johan's mother
- Per Eggers as Johan
- Basia Frydman
- Harald Hamrell as Sentry
- Lars Hansson as Tall Man
- Michael Kallaanvaara
- Leif Magnusson as Nicke
- Tomas Norström
- Börje Nyberg
- Peter Schildt
- Michael Segerström as Preacher
- Lennart R. Svensson
- Marvin Yxner as Sentry
