= Klasse Möllberg =

Swedish actor

Klas Möllberg
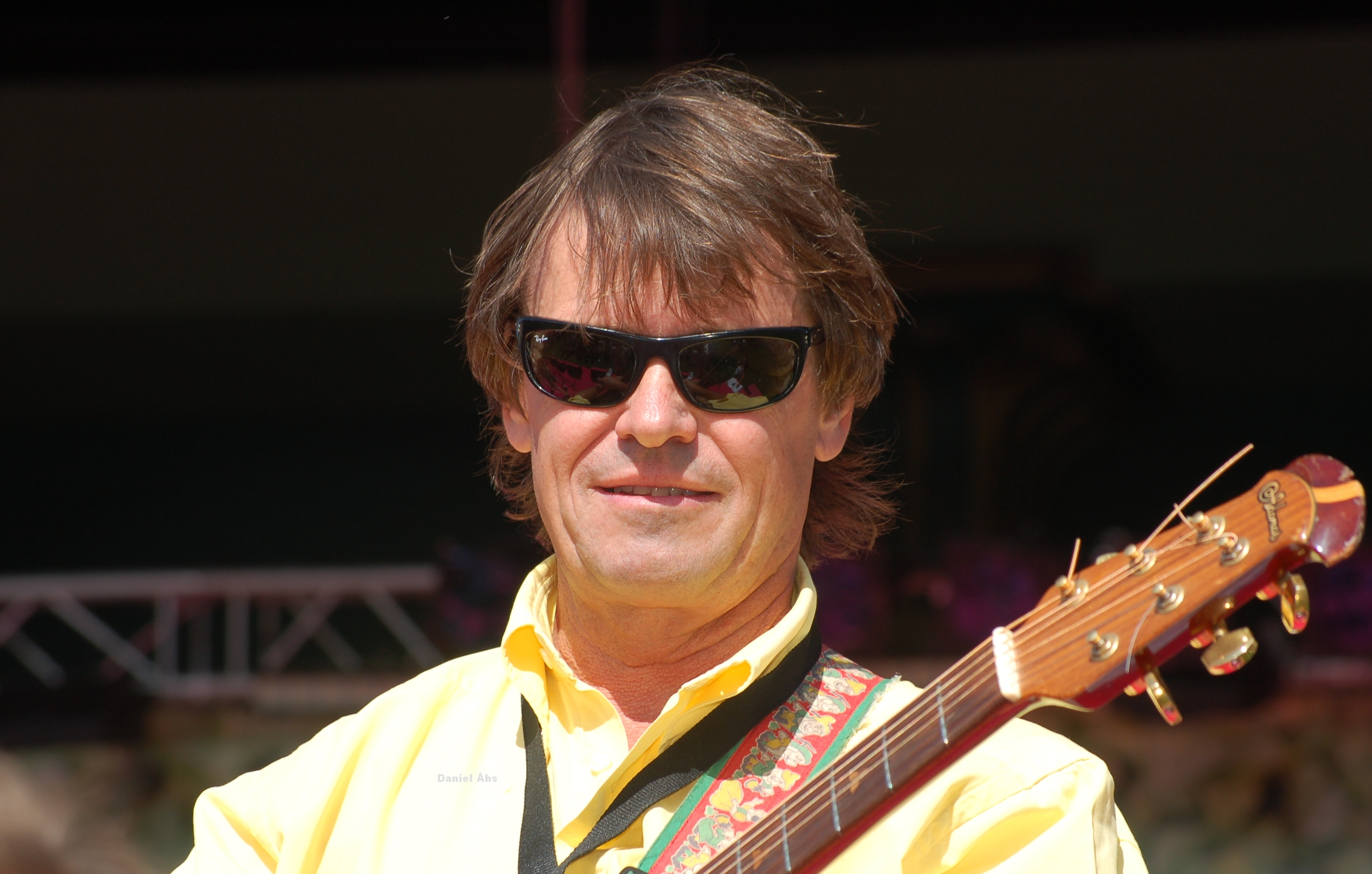
- Klasse Möllberg during Sommarkrysset of at Gröna Lund in Stockholm 2008.

Background information
- Born: 21 April 1948 (age 76); Katrineholm, Sweden
- Occupation(s): musician, actor
- Instrument: guitar
- Years active: 1977-

Klas "Klasse" Möllberg (born 21 April 1948) is a Swedish musician and actor.

== Career ==
Möllberg started performing when he was 18 years old. Later he met the 12 years older musician Lasse Lundberg who influenced him to a music style which he would reflect in his works in the future.

Möllberg is best known for his role as Banarne in Trazan & Banarne. He met "Trazan" (Lasse Åberg) for first time in Gothenburg where Möllberg was playing with a band. They are also members of Electric Banana Band. They also appeared in the 1985 film Sällskapsresan 2 – Snowroller.

Möllberg hosted the 1992 Sveriges Television's Christmas calendar, Klasses julkalender.

In 2009, he competed in the TV program Hjälp! Jag är med i en japansk TV-show and finished in 2nd place.
