= Margo Gunn =

English actress

Margo Gunn (born 8 February 1956) is an English actress and a teacher of drama and theatre studies.

== Biography ==
Born in Doncaster, West Riding of Yorkshire, England, Gunn attended Doncaster Grammar School for Girls. She appeared in Taggart "Cold Blood" in 1987 as Geraldine Keenan and again in "The Knife Trick" in 2009, as Pippa Harris, a friend of Robbie's and a senior lecturer in criminology. She also played the character Suzanne Harris in the 1993 episode "Instrument of Justice".

She currently works teaching drama at Lewes Old Grammar School and as an educational practitioner for the Shakespeare Globe Theatre in London.

== Filmography ==
- 2011 - New Tricks: "End of the Line" (TV)
- 2007 - Dalziel and Pascoe: "Demons on Our Shoulders" (TV)
- 2001 - Murder Rooms: "The White Knight Stratagem" (TV)
- 1998 - The Adventures of Swiss Family Robinson (TV)
- 1997 - Coronation Street (TV)
- 1995 - Heartbeat (TV)
- 1994 - Wycliffe (TV)
- 1993 - Doctor Finlay (TV)
- 1991 - Den ofrivillige golfaren AKA "The Accidental Golfer"
- 1991 - The Bill (TV) Sally Joseph - 'A woman scorned'
- 1991 - The Miser (Theatre)
- 1984 - Look and Read: Badger Girl (TV)
