= Svante Grundberg =

Swedish actor (1943–2019)

- Born: Per Göran Svante Grundberg; 9 November 1943; Njurunda, Sweden
- Died: 25 April 2019 (aged 75); Gävle, Sweden
- Occupation(s): Actor, author, director, stand-up comedian

Per Göran Svante Grundberg, (9 November 1943 – 25 April 2019) was a Swedish actor, author, director and stand-up comedian. Grundberg worked as an actor and director at many theaters like Teater 9 and Radioteatern in Stockholm, he made his movie debut in Marianne Ahrne's movie "Frihetens murar" in 1978, and had after that participated in two more of her productions, the TV-series "Den tredje lyckan" in 1983 and the movie "På liv och död" in 1986. He is also known for his role as Mr. Storch in Sällskapsresan in 1980. He acted in all three of the Göta Kanal movies. In 2000, he published the book Nattsuddboken.

== Filmography ==
=== Film ===
- 1978: Frihetens murar - Waiter
- 1980: Sällskapsresan - Arne Storch
- 1980: Mördare! Mördare! (TV Movie) - Andréasson
- 1980: Mannen som gick upp i rök - Policeman
- 1981: Dagar i Gdansk (TV Movie) - Bogdan Lis
- 1981: Göta kanal eller Vem drog ur proppen? - Kanotisten
- 1982: Gräsänklingar - Staffan
- 1983: Den tredje lyckan (TV Mini-Series) - Hardware Clerk
- 1983: Henrietta - Gotthard
- 1984: Julstrul med Staffan & Bengt (TV Series) - Klas
- 1986: På liv och död - Leif
- 1988: Enkel resa - Sune
- 1988: Guld! (TV Mini-Series) - Nyberg
- 1990: Smash (TV Mini-Series) - Einar Berg
- 1991: Ett paradis utan biljard - Policeman
- 1992: Rederiet (TV Series) - Stig
- 1995: Sommarens Goda (TV-serie)
- 1997: Adam & Eva - Svante Grundberg (uncredited)
- 2000: Ronny & Julia (TV Series) - Elektronika
- 2003: Lillebror på tjuvjakt - Vakt
- 2003: Hagström - allt i musik
- 2006: Göta kanal 2 – kanalkampen - Kanotisten
- 2009: Slitage (Short) - Staffan
- 2009: Göta kanal 3 – Kanalkungens hemlighet - Kanotisten
- 2010: Den ryska dörren (TV Movie) - Communal chairman
- 2012: Flimmer - Styrelsemedlem
- 2017: Småstaden (TV Series) - Tråkbosse (final appearance)

=== Director ===
- 1982: Gluggen (TB)
- 1985–1991: Nattsudd (TV-serie)
- 1987: Bo Diddley: I Don't Sound Like Nobody (TV)
- 1989: The Crickets: My Love Is Bigger Than a Cadillac (TV)
- 1990: Rökrock - The Non-History of Rock'n Roll
- 1994: Goodnight Sweden (TV)
- 2005: Swingen anfaller (TV)

== Bibliography ==
- 2000 -Nattsuddboken ISBN 9789189152052
