= Trolltider – legenden om Bergatrollet =

- Country of origin: Sweden
- Original language: Swedish

Original release
- Network: SVT1; SVT Barn; SVT Play
- Release: 1 December – 24 December 2023

Related
- Kronprinsen som försvann (2022); Snödrömmar (2024)

Trolltider – legenden om Bergatrollet (en:Troll Times - the legend of the mountain troll), is the 2023 Sveriges Television's Christmas calendar and was broadcast from 1 December to 24 December 2023 (Christmas Eve). It is a continuation of Trolltider.

== Roles ==
- Matilda Gross – Saga
- Ossian Skarsgård – troll Love
- Hampus Hallberg – Gustav
- Katarina Ewerlöf – Märta
- Kjell Bergqvist – troll Gorm
- Malte Gårdinger – troll Kotte
- Mimmi Cyon – Sleva
- Helmon Solomon – fairy Dorabella
- Nour El Refai – witch Mara
- Annika Hallin – Siv
- Claes Månsson – Stubbe
- Emma Broomé – Servilia
- Henrik Dorsin – vätten
- Hulda Lind Jóhannsdóttir – Klåff
- Razmus Nyström – Klamp
- Samuel Astor – Vidfarna
- Lena-Pia Bernhardsson – skogsrået
- Ted Åström – Gösta
- Magnus Ehrner – Ragnar
- Ville Virtanen – Rolf
