= Daniel Bergman =

Swedish film director (born 1962)

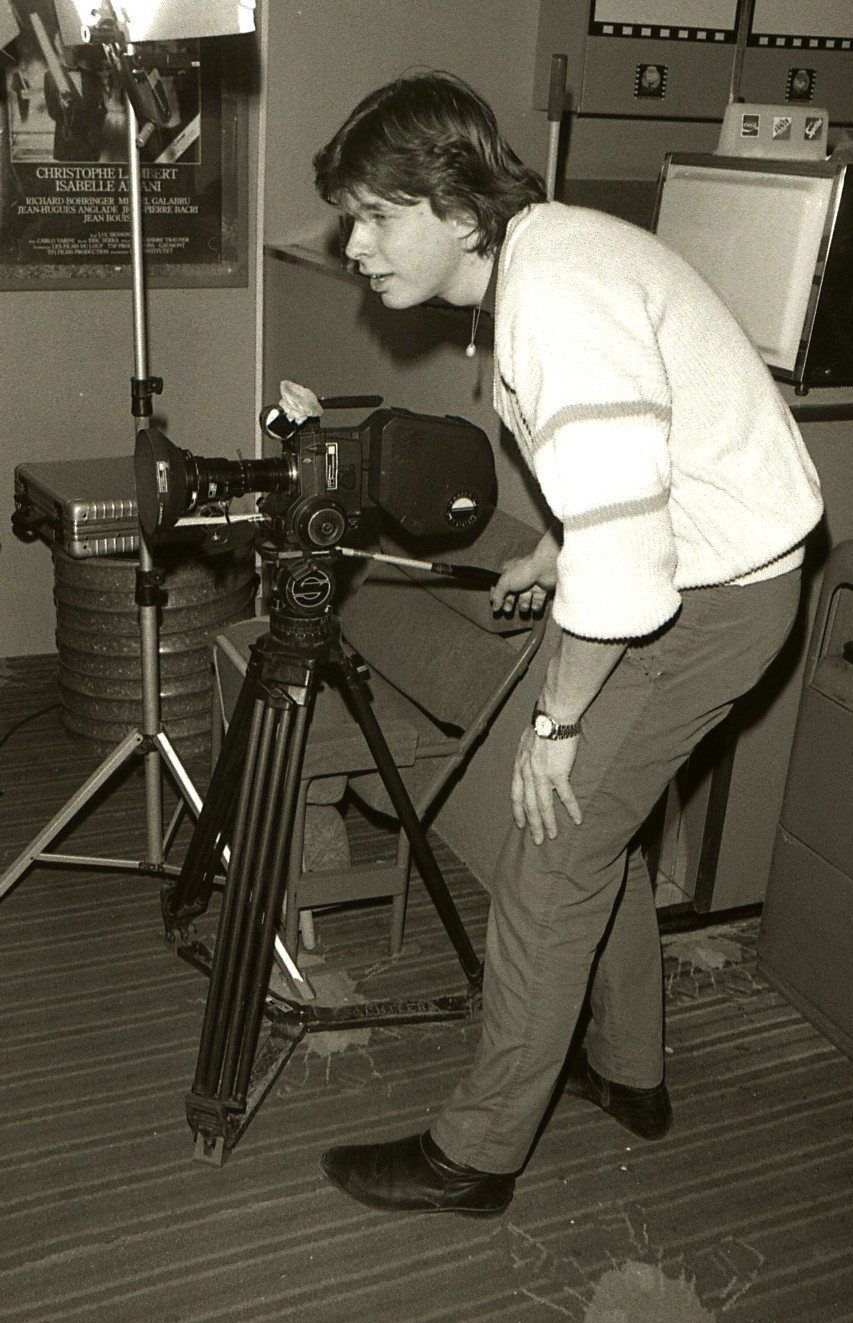
- Bergman in 1988
- Born: Daniel Sebastian Bergman; 7 September 1962 (age 63); Danderyd, Sweden
- Occupation: Film director
- Parent(s): Ingmar Bergman; Käbi Laretei
- Relatives: Eva Bergman (half-sister); Mats Bergman (half-brother); Anna Bergman (half-sister); Linn Ullmann (half-sister)

Daniel Sebastian Bergman (Swedish: [ˈdɑ̂ːnɪɛl ˈbæ̌rjman]; born 7 September 1962) is a Swedish film director.

== Biography ==
He is the son of Ingmar Bergman and Käbi Laretei.

As a child, Bergman appeared in a 1967 Swedish program called Stimulantia, which consisted of eight episodes, one of which was directed by his father Ingmar. The short, 10-minute film focuses on the first two years of Daniel's life. His mother Käbi is also seen.

He was the assistant director of Andrei Tarkovsky on Offret (The Sacrifice, 1986).

Bergman directed an episode of the Swedish horror series Chock, with Ernst-Hugo Järegård.

Bergman's independent ability as a director was seen as compromised following the 1992 film Sunday's Children, which he directed with his father providing the screenplay. The film was seen in Swedish reviews as an attempt by Ingmar to boost the career of his son.

In a 2025 interview, he stated that he no longer works in film. "I work in emergency care and am specialist nurse ... I went to university and studied for four years... I finished film making in 2002."

== Selected filmography ==
- 1987 – Ägget
- 1988 – Go'natt Herr Luffare
- 1989 – Brenda Brave
- 1992 – Söndagsbarn (Sunday's Children)
- 1997 – Svenska hjältar (Swedish Heroes)
