= Gösta Linderholm =

Swedish singer (1941–2020)

- Born: 22 June 1941
- Died: 29 December 2020 (aged 79)
- Instrument: vocals

Gösta Gunnar Linderholm (22 June 1941 – 29 December 2020) was a Swedish singer. He was best known for the hit song "Rulla in en boll och låt den rulla" which was released in 1978. He wrote the music to the film Rasmus på luffen in 1981.
