= Barbro Hiort af Ornäs =

Swedish actress (1921–2015)

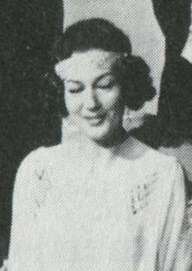
- Hiort af Ornäs in 1964
- Born: Barbro Margareta Eriksdotter Hiort af Ornäs; 28 August 1921; Gothenburg, Sweden
- Died: 27 November 2015 (aged 94); Stockholm, Sweden
- Occupation: Actress
- Years active: 1939–2006
- Spouse: Ernst Nathorst-Böös (divorced)
- Children: 3

Barbro Hiort af Ornäs (28 August 1921 – 27 November 2015) was a Swedish stage and film actress.

== Biography ==
She was born in Gothenburg, Sweden, the daughter of Alma (née Ärnström) and Erik Hiort af Ornäs. She had a brother, Torbjorn.

Along with Bibi Andersson, Eva Dahlbeck, and Ingrid Thulin, she won the Best Actress Award at the 1958 Cannes Film Festival for Brink of Life. In 1989, she was given the Litteris et Artibus for her services to the arts in Sweden. Hiort af Ornäs died in Bromma on 28 November 2015, aged 94.

== Partial filmography ==
- Imprisoned Women (1943) - Kaj
- Youth in Danger (1946) - Bibbi Nicklasson
- Flickan från tredje raden (1949) - Dagmar Antonsson
- Fiancée for Hire (1950)- Gertrud Stenström
- While the City Sleeps (1950) - Rutan
- Count Svensson (1951) - Greta Svensson
- Barabbas (1953) - Maria of Magdala (uncredited)
- Darling of Mine (1955) - Linda Loy
- Das Fräulein von Scuderi (1955) - La Martiniere
- Sju vackra flickor (1956) - Adele Hellgren
- Vägen genom Skå (1957) - Emma
- Som man bäddar... (1957) - Secretary
- Spielbank-Affäre (1957) - Schulleiterin
- A Guest in His Own House (1957) - Lisen
- Brink of Life (1958) - Nurse Brita
- Pojken i trädet (1961) - Mother
- Lita på mej älskling (1961) - Juror (uncredited)
- All These Women (1964) - Beatrica
- Loving Couples (1964) - Lilian von Pahlen - née Vind-Frijs
- Shame (1968) - Kvinna i flyktingbåten
- ...som havets nakna vind (1968) - Aida
- Som natt och dag (1969) - Madeleine
- Eva - den utstötta (1969) - Jenny Berggren
- The Passion of Anna (1969) - Woman in Dream (uncredited)
- Skräcken har 1000 ögon (1970) - Barbro, Sven's Aunt
- The Touch (1971) - Karin's Mother (uncredited)
- Scenes from a Marriage (1973) - Stefan's mother
- Bröllopet (1973) - Karin Löfgren
- What the Swedish Butler Saw (1975) - Jack's Mother
- Mackan (1977) - Skolkökslärarinna
- Den nya människan (1979) - Lärere
- Father to Be (1979) - Greta, sjuksyster
- Sällskapsresan 2 – Snowroller (1985) - Stig Helmers mamma
- S.O.S. – En segelsällskapsresa (1988) - Stig Helmers mamma
- Amelia (1991) - Yvonne, Gösta's mother
- Den ofrivillige golfaren (1991) - Mamma
- Selma & Johanna - En roadmovie (1997) - Grandma
- Hälsoresan – En smal film av stor vikt (1999) - Mamma
- Den utvalde (2005) - Mormor
