= The Stig-Helmer Story =

2011 Swedish comedy film

- Directed by: Lasse Åberg
- Written by: Lasse Åberg
- Produced by: Bo Jonsson; Serina Björnbom; Christer Abrahamsen
- Starring: Lasse Åberg; Jon Skolmen
- Cinematography: Mats Axby
- Music by: Janne Schaffer, Björn J:son Lindh
- Distributed by: AB Svensk Filmindustri
- Release date: 25 December 2011 (Sweden)
- Country: Sweden
- Language: Swedish

The Stig-Helmer Story is a Swedish comedy film which was released to cinemas in Sweden on 25 December 2011, directed by Lasse Åberg. The film is the sixth film in the Sällskapsresan film series about Stig-Helmer Olsson.

== Cast ==
- Lasse Åberg as Stig-Helmer (71 years old)
- Tobias Jacobsson as Stig-Helmer (20 years old)
- Filip Arsic Johnsson as Stig-Helmer (12 years old)
- Jon Skolmen as Ole Bramserud
- Ida Högberg as Annika (18 years old)
- Tove Edfeldt as Hjördis
- Bill Hugg as Julle
- Jonas Bane as Biffen (20 years old)
- Nils Bodner as Biffen (12 years old)
- Andreas Nilsson as the major
- Elisabet Carlsson as Märta
- Stefan Sauk as Biffen's father
- Cecilia Ljung as Svea
- Patrick Jakobsson as Mr Cheng

== Reception ==
The film has received mixed reviews. The Swedish newspaper Aftonbladet rated the film as 3/5, Expressen as 2/5, Metro as 3/5 and Svenska Dagbladet as 4/6.
