= Electric Banana Band =

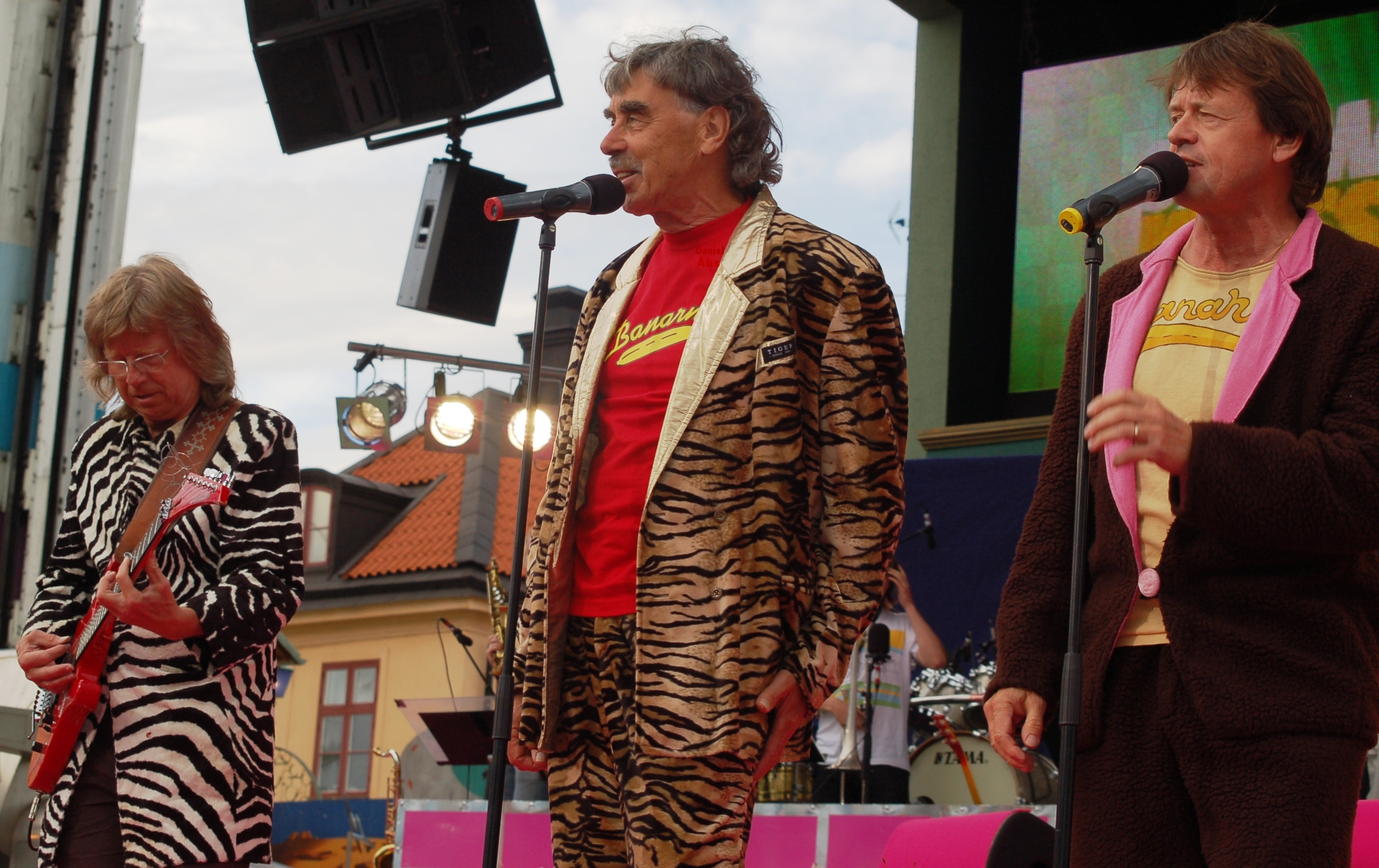
- Janne Schaffer, Lasse Åberg and Klasse Möllberg on Gröna Lund in 2008

Background information
- Origin: Sweden
- Genres: children's music, rock
- Years active: 1980-
- Labels: Warner Bros. Records

Electric Banana Band is a Swedish children's music/rock music band formed in 1980.

== History ==
Electric Banana Band was formed as a response to the success of Trazan & Banarne, a highly acclaimed Swedish children's television programme, also produced by two of the band members, Lasse Åberg and Klasse Möllberg. The band takes on a jungle theme, partially borrowing elements from The Phantom, a widely popular comic in Sweden, as well as Tarzan. Their jungle theme included both their costumes, designed to reflect the nicknames of the lineup, as well as the songs, which usually had nature-inspired themes.

Despite being mainly a studio band, the band does some occasional touring, mainly at free events as the members of the band are not dependent upon the success of the band.

In the 2003 film Smala Sussie the band was mentioned several times and became somewhat of a comedic plot element.

The band competed in Melodifestivalen 2006 with their song Kameleont (Chameleon).

== Members ==
- Lasse Åberg - Lead Vocals
- Klasse Möllberg - Lead Vocals
- Janne Schaffer - Guitar
- Jonas Gideon - Keyboards
- Lars Olsson - Drums
- Jouni Haapala - Percussion
- Fredrik Jonsson - Bass
- Tobias Wendeler - Vocals
- Riltons Vänner - Vocals

=== Past members ===
- Stefan Blomquist - Keyboard
- Per Lindvall - Drums
- Åke Sundqvist - Percussion
- Christer Jansson - Percussion
- Tommy Cassemar - Bass
- Sven Lindvall - Bass
- Magnus and Henrik Rongedal - Vocals
- Marianne Flynner - Vocals
- Maria Wickman - Vocals
- Annica Boller - Vocals
- Mårgan Höglund - Drums
- Thobias Gabrielsson - Bass

== Media ==
=== Albums ===
- 1981 - Electric Banana Band
- 1984 - Livet i regnskogarna
- 1993 - The Golden Years 1981-1986 (compilation)
- 1998 - Electric Banana Tajm (compilation)
- 2000 - Den Hela Människan (music from the film Hälsoresan, together with Björn J:son Lindh)
- 2000 - Nu e're djur igen
- 2005 - Electric Banana Bands och Trazan & Banarnes bästa (compilation)
- 2006 - Kameleont (compilation)
- 2006 - Banankontakt - Musikaltajm! (compilation, together with Malmö Operaorkester)
- 2014 - Schyssta Bananer (compilation)

=== Books ===
In 1999 Electric Banana Band released a song book called Sångtajm with sheet music on many songs from the albums.

=== Film and television ===
- 1980 - Trazan Apansson & Banarne
- 1980 - Trazan Apansson-E' bananerna fina?
- 1980 - Trazan Apansson-Djungelmums
- 1981 - Biotajm med Trazan & Banarne
- 1982 - Videotajm med Trazan & Banarne
- 1998 - Electric Banana Band the Movie - djungelns kojigaste rulle
