= Anna Bergman =

Swedish actress (born 1948)

- Born: 5 May 1948 (age 78); Gothenburg, Sweden
- Spouse: Peter Brown (1966–1981)
- Parent(s): Ingmar Bergman; Ellen Lundström
- Relatives: Mats Bergman (twin brother); Eva Bergman (sister); Lena Bergman (paternal half-sister); Daniel Bergman (paternal half-brother); Linn Ullmann (paternal half-sister)

Anna Bergman (born 5 May 1948) is a Swedish retired actress. She is the daughter of film and theatre director Ingmar Bergman and choreographer-director Ellen Lundström, sister to Eva, Jan, and Mats Bergman (twin); and half-sister to Daniel Bergman and Linn Ullmann.

Bergman mostly appeared as a performer in several British sex comedies during the late 1970s including the title role in Penelope Pulls It Off (1975), Adventures of a Taxi Driver (1976), Intimate Games (1976), Come Play with Me (1977) and What's Up Superdoc! (1978). She also starred as Penny in the 1977 sex spy comedy Agent 69 in the Sign of Scorpio (a.k.a. Emmanuele in Denmark) and the 1978 sequel Agent 69 in the Sign of Sagittarius (a.k.a. More Danish Blue).

Later she appeared in small roles in more mainstream films including The Wild Geese (1978), Licensed to Love and Kill (1979), Nutcracker (1982), and her father's 1982 film Fanny and Alexander. She also appeared as Swedish au pair Ingrid Svenson in series 2 and 4 of the British situation comedy Mind Your Language.

== Additional sources ==
- Simon Sheridan. Keeping the British End Up: Four Decades of Saucy Cinema (3rd Edition). Reynolds & Hearn Books, 2007.
- Simon Sheridan. X-Rated - Adventures of an Exploitation Filmmaker. Reynolds & Hearn Books, 2008.
- Anna Bergman with Gun Årestad. Inte Pappas Flicka (autobiography). Höganäs: Bra Bok, 1988. ISBN 91-7752-201-X.
- Anna Bergman. Crooks (novel). AuthorHouse, 2009. ISBN 978-1-4490-2155-9.
