= I, a Lover =

1966 film

- Directed by: Börje Nyberg
- Written by: Peer Guldbrandsen
- Produced by: Peer Guldbrandsen
- Starring: Jørgen Ryg
- Cinematography: Jan Lindeström
- Edited by: Edith Nisted Nielsen
- Release date: 11 April 1966
- Running time: 91 minutes
- Countries: Sweden; Denmark
- Language: Danish

I, a Lover (Swedish: Jag - en älskare, Danish: Jeg - en elsker) is a 1966 Swedish-Danish comedy film directed by Börje Nyberg and starring Jørgen Ryg.

Peter's wife Beatrice is abandoning him because he is impotent. She goes to Paris with Isac, her lover. Peter's friend Ole takes him to his country place.

== Cast ==
- Jørgen Ryg - Peter Isløv
- Jessie Flaws - Elizabeth Schmidt
- Axel Strøbye - Ole Schmidt
- Kerstin Wartel - Sigrid Schmidt
- Marie Ahrle - Beatrice Isløv (as Marie Nylander)
- Ebbe Langberg - Isac Andersen
- Jeanne Darville - Ulla Pauce
- Paul Hagen - Torbjørn Pauce
- Jytte Breuning - Hilda
- Dirch Passer - Mortensen
- Birgitta Fjeldhede
- Sigrid Horne-Rasmussen - Kollega til Peter
- Birger Jensen - Mand i biograf
- Tove Maës - Patient hos Ulla Pauce
- Lise Thomsen - Patient hos Ulla Pauce
