= Rasmus på luffen =

1981 film

- Swedish DVD cover
- Directed by: Olle Hellbom
- Written by: Astrid Lindgren
- Produced by: Olle Hellbom
- Starring: Allan Edwall; Erik Lindgren; Jarl Kulle; Håkan Serner
- Music by: Gösta Linderholm; Björn Isfält
- Distributed by: AB Svensk Filmindustri
- Release date: 12 December 1981 (Sweden)
- Running time: 105 minutes
- Country: Sweden
- Language: Swedish

Rasmus på luffen is a Swedish film directed by Olle Hellbom, which was released to cinemas in Sweden on 12 December 1981. It is based on the 1955 film Luffaren och Rasmus by Astrid Lindgren, and the book Rasmus på luffen by Lindgren published in 1956.

== Plot ==
The story is set in the year 1910 when a child, Rasmus, runs away from the orphanage Västerhaga and meets the hobo Oskar.

== Cast ==
- Allan Edwall as Oskar
- Erik Lindgren as Rasmus
- Jarl Kulle as Hilding Lif
- Håkan Serner as Liander
- Olof Bergström as Länsman (policeman)
- Rolf Larsson as policeman Bergqvist
- Roland Hedlund as policeman Andersson
- Lena Brogren as Martina, Oskar's wife
- Tommy Johnson as Nilsson
- Lottie Ejebrant as Nilsson's wife
- Lars Amble as merchant
- Lena Nyman as merchant's wife
- Georg Adelly as Lusknäpparn, Hobo
- Göran Graffman as Rosasco, Hobo
- Gösta Linderholm as Sju Attan, a Hobo
- Ulla-Britt Norrman-Olsson as the first woman visited by Oskar and Rasmus
- Emy Storm as the principal of Västerhaga
- Svea Holst as Lille-Sara
- Bertil Norström as mayor
- Pål Steen as Gunnar, child at Västerhaga
- Fredrik Ljungdahl as child at Västerhaga
- Stefan Delvin as child at Västerhaga
- Jonas Karlsson as child at Västerhaga

== About film ==
Rasmus på luffen was re-released on DVD on 5 November 2003.

This was the final film of director Hellbom, who died the next year.
