= Sølvmunn =

- Directed by: Per Blom
- Written by: Martin Asphaug
- Produced by: Jan Erik Düring
- Starring: Tobias Asphaug; Jon Skolmen
- Cinematography: Erling Thurmann-Andersen
- Edited by: Lars Hagström
- Music by: Lille Frøen Saksofonkvartett
- Distributed by: Norsk Film
- Release date: December 1, 1981
- Running time: 85 minutes
- Country: Norway
- Language: Norwegian

Sølvmunn (Silvermouth) is a Norwegian drama and family film from 1981 directed by Per Blom. The main roles are played by Tobias Asphaug and Jon Skolmen.

== Plot ==
The film tells the story of a nine-year-old boy named Fredrik that lives with his father after his mother has left. The father and son stick together through thick and thin, but problems arise when Fredrik's father meets Tove. Much of the film is seen from the child's perspective. The film depicts how Fredrik, nicknamed Sølvmunn 'Silvermouth', experiences his own world and the world of adults.

== Reception ==
Sølvmunn received a mixed reception from Arbeiderbladet's reviewer Bjørn Granum when it was released. Among other things, he wrote that "We can look forward to another well-executed child portrayal in Norwegian film, after Løperjenten, Liten Ida, and Zeppelin." But he also wrote that "The first three-quarters of the film are pure nonsense, poorly written and played, and indifferently directed. The film does not take off until the conflict between the child and the adults escalates in earnest. Dagbladet's Thor Ellingsen was more positive in his review, and wrote, among other things, that "Sølvmunn is a professional and polished work—without being slick."

== Cast ==
- Jon Skolmen as Fredrik's father
- Tobias Asphaug as Fredrik
- Kine Hellebust as Fredrik's mother
- Sigrid Huun as Tove
- Turid Balke as the angry landlady
- Jan Olav Brynjulfsen as the watchman
- Lars Andreas Larssen as a man on the airplane
- Hallvard Lydvo as a man on the airplane
- William Nyrén as a policeman
- Gard Øyen as a man on the airplane
- Nina Sonja Peterson as Fredrik's friend Minken
- Leif Skarra as a man on the airplane
- Bjørn Sothberg as the parking attendant
