= Jan Halldoff =

Swedish film director

- Born: Jan Harry Halldoff; 4 September 1939; Stockholm, Sweden
- Died: 23 July 2010 (aged 70); Stockholm, Sweden
- Occupations: Film director Screenwriter
- Years active: 1966–1982
- Spouse: Kerstin Höglund (m. 1966–2010)

Jan Harry Halldoff (4 September 1939 – 23 July 2010) was a Swedish film director and screenwriter. He directed 17 films between 1966 and 1982.

His 1967 film titled Life's Just Great was entered into the 17th Berlin International Film Festival. His 1968 film titled The Corridor was entered into the 6th Moscow International Film Festival. His 1974 film The Last Adventure won the award for Best Film at the 11th Guldbagge Awards. His 1976 film Polare won the award for Best Director at the 12th Guldbagge Awards.

== Films, as director ==
- Nilsson (1965)
- Håltimma (1965)
- Myten (1966)
- Life's Just Great (1967)
- Ola och Julia (1967)
- Rätt man (1968)
- The Corridor (1968)
- Porträtt av en stad (1969)
- En dröm om frihet (1969)
- Ute (1970)
- Rötmånad (1970)
- Bajen (1970)
- Firmafesten (1972)
- Stenansiktet (1973)
- Bröllopet (1973)
- The Last Adventure (1974)
- Polare (1976)
- Jack (1977)
- Chez Nous (1978)
- Vad händer...? (1979)
- Tillsammans (1979)
- Lämna mej inte ensam (1980)
