= Second Dance =

1983 film

- Directed by: Lárus Ýmir Óskarsson
- Written by: Lars Bill Lundholm
- Starring: Kim Anderzon
- Cinematography: Göran Nilsson
- Release date: 9 February 1983
- Running time: 95 minutes
- Country: Sweden
- Language: Swedish

Second Dance (Swedish: Andra dansen) is a 1983 Swedish drama film directed by Lárus Ýmir Óskarsson. Kim Anderzon won the award for Best Actress at the 19th Guldbagge Awards.

== Cast ==
- Kim Anderzon as Anna
- Lisa Hugoson as Jo
- Tommy Johnson
- Hans Bredefeldt as Isak
- Sigurður Sigurjónsson
- Göte Fyhring
- Olof Lindfors as Harry
- Anders Åberg
- Johan Lindell
- Colbjörn Lindberg as Ingvar
- Tomas Norström as Manne
- János Herskó (as Janos Hersko)
- Thore Segelström as Evert
