= Life's Just Great =

1967 film

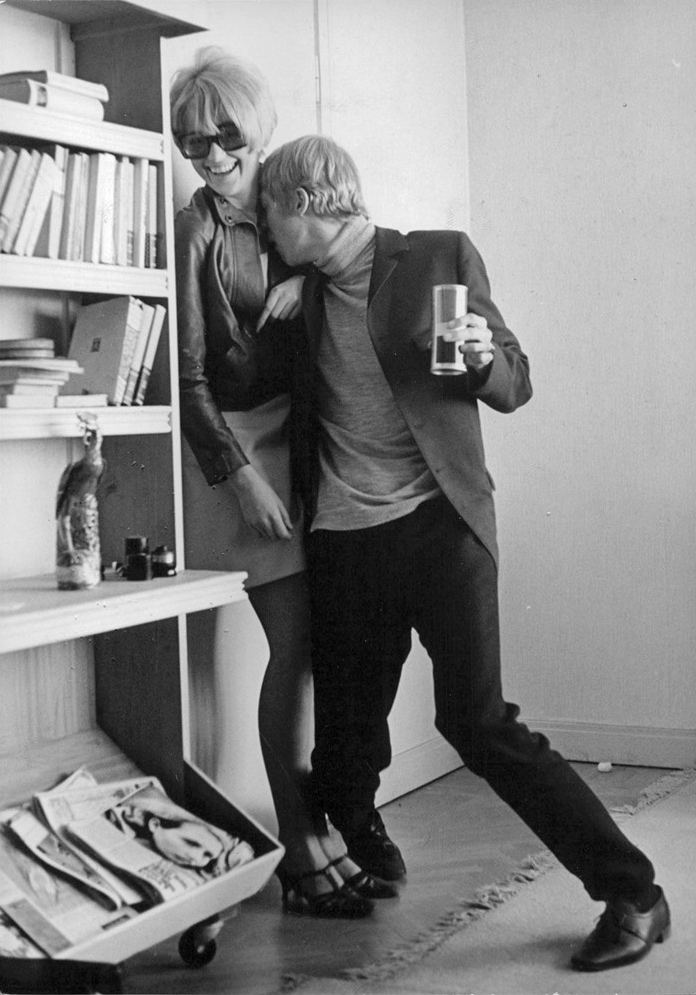
- Film still
- Directed by: Jan Halldoff
- Written by: Jan Halldoff; Stig Claesson
- Starring: Inger Taube
- Cinematography: Peter Fischer
- Edited by: Wic Kjellin
- Release date: 23 January 1967
- Running time: 84 minutes
- Country: Sweden
- Language: Swedish

Life's Just Great (Swedish: Livet är stenkul) is a 1967 Swedish drama film directed by Jan Halldoff. It was entered into the 17th Berlin International Film Festival.

== Cast ==
- Inger Taube as Britt
- Maj Nielsen as Maj
- Keve Hjelm as Roland
- Bengt Ekerot as The Neighbour
- Lars Hansson as Kent
- Thomas Janson as Thomas
- Stig Törnblom as Jan
- Leif Claesson as Lill-Roland
- Stig Claesson as Writer in Bar
- Lena Hansson as The Sallow Girl
- Lage Lindell as Artist in Bar
- Ove Magnusson as Journalist in Bar
- Mads Rydman as Man Hit by Car
- Hanny Schedin as Grandma
