= Repmånad =

1979 film

- Swedish DVD-cover
- Directed by: Lasse Åberg; Peter Hald
- Written by: Lasse Åberg; Bo Jonsson; Lars Molin
- Produced by: Bo Jonsson
- Starring: Lasse Åberg; Janne 'Loffe' Carlsson; Ted Åström
- Music by: Janne Schaffer
- Distributed by: Europafilm; Ri-Film; Viking Film
- Release date: 23 February 1979 (Sweden)
- Running time: 85 minutes
- Country: Sweden
- Language: Swedish

Repmånad is a Swedish comedy film which was released to cinemas in Sweden on 23 February 1979, directed by Lasse Åberg. The plot revolves around a group of men called in for refresher exercise (known as "repmånad" in Swedish, hence the title) in the Swedish Army, and who did their national service together some years earlier. The alternative name is "How to make boys out of men (Swedish:hur man gör pojkar av män), a joke on the military motto "We make men out of boys".

== Cast ==
- Janne 'Loffe' Carlsson as Oskar Löfgren
- Lasse Åberg as Helge Jonsson
- Ted Åström as Börje Larsson
- Lasse Haldenberg as Hans Öberg
- Weiron Holmberg as Tore Tallroth
- Lennart Skoogh as Jonas Gustafsson
- Ingvar Andersson as Captain 'Beethoven'
- Lena Maria Gårdenäs as Bea
- Agneta Prytz as Helge's mother
- Peter Ahlm as Major
- Lars Amble as Chief Editor
- Bengt Berger as Col. Berg
- Malou Berg as Doris' Friend
- Monica Dominique as Doris
- Charlie Elvegård as Göte
