= János Herskó =

Hungarian film director

- Born: 9 April 1926; Budapest, Hungary
- Died: 12 October 2011 (aged 85)
- Occupations: Film director Actor
- Years active: 1948–2006

János Herskó (9 April 1926 – 12 October 2011) was a Béla Balázs Award-winning Hungarian film director and actor. He appeared in 15 films between 1963 and 2006. He also directed nine films between 1948 and 1990. In 1963, he was a member of the jury at the 3rd Moscow International Film Festival.

== Selected filmography ==
- Under the City (1953)
- Iron Flower (1958)
- And Then The Guy... (1966)
- Second Dance (1983)
