= Polare (film) =

1976 film

- Directed by: Jan Halldoff
- Written by: Lars Molin; Jan Halldoff
- Produced by: Bo Jonsson
- Starring: Anki Lidén
- Release date: 19 March 1976
- Running time: 104 minutes
- Country: Sweden
- Language: Swedish

Polare is a 1976 Swedish drama film directed by Jan Halldoff. Halldoff won the award for Best Director at the 12th Guldbagge Awards.

== Cast ==
- Anki Lidén as Lena Sjöberg
- Göran Stangertz as Kent Fredrikson
- Thomas Hellberg as Lasse Stark
- Christer Jonsson as Olle Pettersson (credited as Bonzo Jonsson)
- Ted Åström as Sven Risell
- Anne Kulle as Katarina Risell (credited as Anne Nord)
- Kisa Magnusson as Siri
- Ann-Marie Adamsson as Kent's co-worker (credited as Ann-Mari Adamsson)
- Christina Carlwind as Nurse
- Göte Claesson as Editor
- Inger Ellman as Siw Pettersson
- Bo Halldoff as Kent's Chief
