= Tommy Johnson (actor) =

Swedish actor (1931–2005)

Tommy Clarence Fredrik Johnson (5 December 1931, in Stockholm – 17 July 2005, in Stockholm) was a Swedish actor. He worked at Uppsala City Theatre and Malmö City Theatre. In 1988 he received the Cornelis Vreeswijk Scholarship.

== Selected filmography ==
- 1964 - Vi på Saltkråkan (TV)
- 1968 - Badarna
- 1969 - Kråkguldet (TV)
- 1971 - Badjävlar (TV film)
- 1973 - Någonstans i Sverige (TV)
- 1976 - Fleksnes Fataliteter (TV)
- 1977 - Bröderna Lejonhjärta
- 1981 - Rasmus på luffen
- 1982 - Polisen som vägrade svara (TV)
- 1983 - Second Dance
- 1983 - Farmor och vår Herre (TV)
- 1983 - Midvinterduell (TV film)
- 1984 & 1988 - Träpatronerna (TV)
- 1984 - The Man from Majorca
- 1988 - Kråsnålen (TV)
- 1993 - Kådisbellan
- 1993 - Murder at the Savoy
- 1994 - Sommarmord
- 1995 - Snoken (TV)
- 1997 - Spring för livet
- 1998 - Tre Kronor (TV series)
