= Linn Ullmann =

Norwegian author and journalist (born 1966)

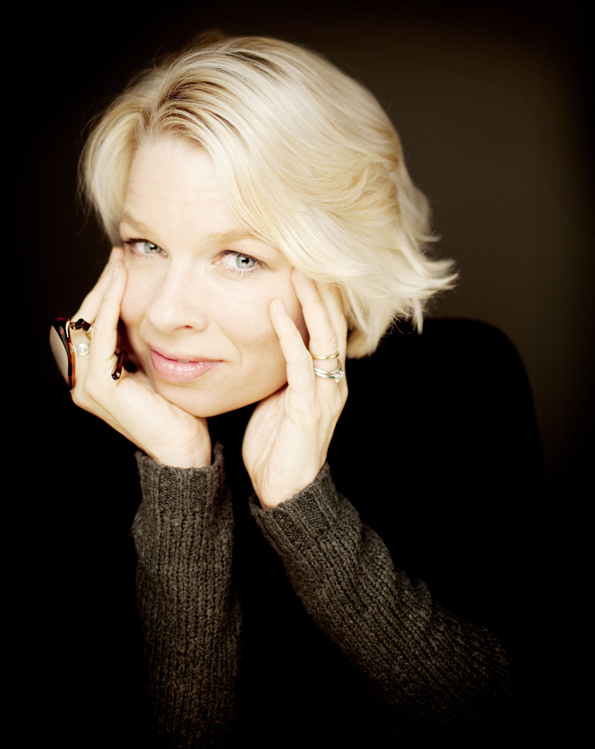
- Ullmann in 2011
- Born: Karin Beate Ullmann; 9 August 1966 (age 60); Oslo, Norway
- Education: New York University
- Spouse: Niels Fredrik Dahl
- Children: 2
- Parent(s): Liv Ullmann; Ingmar Bergman
- Relatives: Lena Bergman (paternal half-sister); Eva Bergman (paternal half-sister); Mats Bergman (paternal half-brother); Anna Bergman (paternal half-sister); Daniel Bergman (paternal half-brother)
- Website: linnullmann.no/en

Karin Beate "Linn" Ullmann (born 9 August 1966) is a Norwegian author and journalist. A prominent literary critic, she writes a column for Norway's leading morning newspaper and has published seven novels. She is also a former child actress, having appeared in four films.

== Early life ==
Ullmann was born in Oslo, Norway, to Norwegian actress, author, and director Liv Ullmann and Swedish director and screenwriter Ingmar Bergman. She grew up in New York City and Oslo.

Ullmann attended Professional Children's School in Manhattan. When she was 15, she was "kicked out" (as she puts it) of the Norwegian National Opera and Ballet. She attended Juilliard School as a prospective dancer and graduated from New York University, where she studied English literature and began work on her PhD.

== Career ==
When Ullmann’s first novel, Before You Sleep, was published in 1998, she was already known as an influential literary critic. Her second novel, Stella Descending, was published in 2001 and her third, Grace, in 2002. For Grace, Ullmann received the literary award The Readers' Prize in Norway, and Grace was named one of the top ten novels that year by the Danish newspaper Weekendavisen. In 2007, Grace was longlisted for the Independent Foreign Fiction Prize in the United Kingdom, and in the Norwegian theater Riksteatret played a successful run of the theatrical play Grace, based on the novel.

Ullmann's fourth novel, A Blessed Child, was published in Norway in 2005, and was shortlisted for the Brage Prize. In 2007, she received the Amalie Skram Award for her literary work and the Gullpennen (Golden Pen) for her journalism in the Norwegian newspaper Aftenposten. In 2008, A Blessed Child was named Best Translated novel in the British newspaper The Independent, and in 2009 the novel was longlisted for the Independent Foreign Fiction Prize in the UK and the International IMPAC Dublin Literary Award in Ireland. Ullmann's novels are published throughout Europe and the United States and are translated into 30 languages.

Ullmann is co-founder (2009) and former artistic director of the international artist residency foundation The Bergman Estate on Fårö.

She served on the jury for the main competition at the 2011 Cannes Film Festival.

Ullmann's fifth novel, The Cold Song, was published in Norway in 2011.

In 2015, Ullmann appeared as a featured author, leading a writing seminar, at the annual Iceland Writers Retreat in Reykjavik, Iceland.

== Personal life ==
Ullmann is married to Niels Fredrik Dahl, a novelist, playwright and poet. They live in Oslo. She has two children, including Halfdan Ullmann Tøndel, and two stepchildren.

== Literary works ==
- Before You Sleep (Før du sovner) 1998
- Stella Descending (Når jeg er hos deg) 2001
- Grace (Nåde) 2002
- A Blessed Child (Et Velsignet Barn) 2005
- The Cold Song (Det dyrebare) 2011
- Unquiet (De urolige) 2019
- Girl, 1983 (Jente, 1983) 2021

== Literary awards ==
- Gold Pen (in Norwegian) (2007)
- Amalie Skram Prize (in Norwegian) (2007)
- Norwegian Readers' Prize (in Norwegian) (2002)

== Filmography ==
=== Film ===
Year	Title	Role	Director
1971	The Emigrants	Kristina's daughter	Jan Troell
1972	The New Land	Kristina's daughter	Jan Troell
1973	Cries and Whispers	Maria's daughter	Ingmar Bergman
1978	Autumn Sonata	Eva (child)	Ingmar Bergman

=== Television ===
- 2026 – The Cold Song (adapted from Ullmann's novel)
