= Eva Bergman =

Swedish director (born 1945)

- Born: 5 September 1945 (age 79); Helsingborg, Sweden
- Occupation: Director
- Years active: 1974–1997
- Spouse: Henning Mankell (m. 1998; died 2015)
- Father: Ingmar Bergman
- Relatives: Mats Bergman (brother); Anna Bergman (sister); Lena Bergman (paternal half-sister); Daniel Bergman (paternal half-brother); Linn Ullmann (paternal half-sister)

Eva Bergman (born 5 September 1945) is a Swedish film, theatre and television director who worked at Dramaten. She is the daughter of Swedish director Ingmar Bergman, and was married to crime writer Henning Mankell from 1998 until his death in 2015.

== Filmography ==
- En Midsommarnattsdröm (1990) (TV)
- Trappen (1991) (TV)
- One Love and the Other (1994)
- Gisslan (1996) (TV)
- Faust (1996) (TV)
- Sven (1997)
