= Vägen genom Skå =

1957 Swedish drama film

- Directed by: Hans Dahlin
- Starring: Eva Stiberg
- Release date: 4 March 1957
- Running time: 79 minutes
- Country: Sweden
- Language: Swedish

Vägen genom Skå is a 1957 Swedish drama film directed by Hans Dahlin.

== Cast ==
- Eva Stiberg as Inga
- Erik Strandmark as Walter
- Lasse Sarri as Dockan
- Ann-Charlotte Bergman as Anna
- Barbro Hiort af Ornäs as Emma
- Björn Berglund as Anders Torstensson
- Rud Falne as Jurre
- Franko Mariano as Angelo
- Sven Almgren as Gunne
- Ingemar Pallin as Svenne
- Arne Källerud as Björn
