= The Corridor (1968 film) =

1968 film

- Directed by: Jan Halldoff
- Written by: Bengt Bratt; Bengt Forslund; Jan Halldoff
- Produced by: Bengt Forslund
- Starring: Per Ragnar
- Cinematography: Inge Roos
- Release date: 11 December 1968
- Running time: 79 minutes
- Country: Sweden
- Language: Swedish

The Corridor (Swedish: Korridoren) is a 1968 Swedish drama film directed by Jan Halldoff. It was entered into the 6th Moscow International Film Festival.

== Plot ==
The Corridor (1968), directed by Jan Halldoff, is a Swedish drama that delves into the psychological strain experienced by a newly graduated doctor, Jan Eriksson. As he navigates the demanding environment of a hospital, he faces overwhelming trauma and the relentless pressures of the medical profession. These challenges push him to the brink of abandoning his career, yet he seeks peace in research as a potential escape from the mounting stress.

== Cast ==
- Per Ragnar as Dr. Jan Eriksson
- Agneta Ekmanner as Kerstin
- Ann Norstedt as Maria
- Åke Lindström as The Father
- Inga Landgré as The Mother
- Gunnar Biörck as Professor Gunnar Bjork
- Leif Liljeroth as Dr. Forslund
- Lars Amble as Stig

== Reception ==
Notably, it became Sweden's highest-grossing film during the 1968–69 cinema season, reflecting its significant impact on Swedish audiences. Approximately 440,000 cinema-goers during the 1968–69 season.
