= Lars Molin (filmmaker) =

Swedish writer and film director (1942–1999)

- Born: Lars Fredrik Molin; 6 May 1942; Järpen, Sweden
- Died: 7 February 1999 (aged 56); Sundbyberg, Sweden
- Occupation: Film director
- Years active: 1970–1999

Lars Fredrik Molin (6 May 1942 – 7 February 1999) was a Swedish writer and movie director who won an Emmy Award for The Tattooed Widow in 1999. Molin was born in Järpen, Sweden, and died in Sundbyberg Municipality.

== Awards ==
- Prix Futura 1989
- Thaliapriset 1991
- Club 100 Prize 1989

== Selected filmography ==
- Polare (1976)
- Höjdhoppar'n (1981)
- Sommarmord (1994)
