= Erik Carlsson (weightlifter) =

Swedish weightlifter

Personal information
- Nationality: Swedish
- Born: 21 July 1893 Stockholm, Sweden
- Died: 18 May 1981 (aged 87) Stockholm, Sweden

Sport
- Sport: Weightlifting

Erik Bertil Carlsson (21 July 1893 – 18 May 1981) was a Swedish weightlifter. He competed in the men's light heavyweight event at the 1920 Summer Olympics.
