= Kim Anderzon =

Swedish actress (1943–2014)

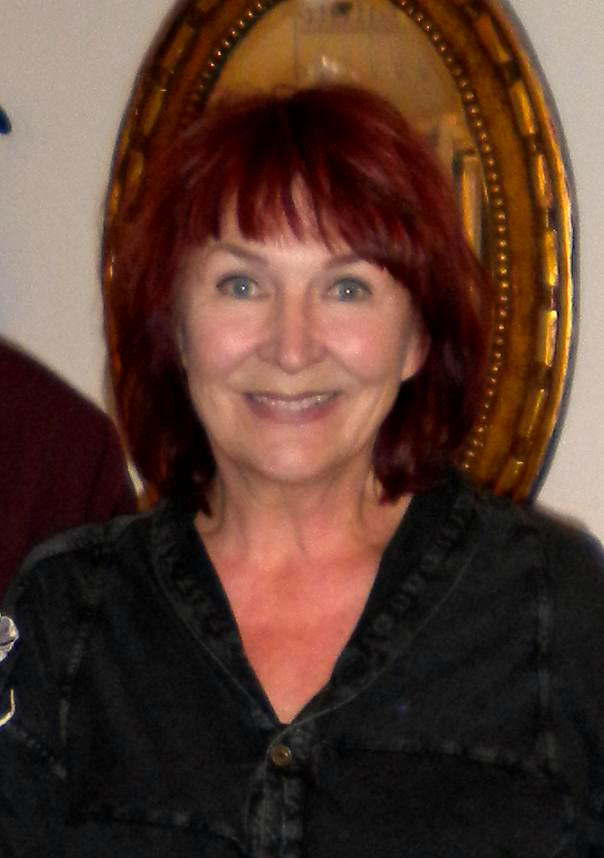
- Anderzon in 2009
- Born: Kerstin Kristina Birgitta Andersson; 20 March 1943; Östersund, Sweden
- Died: 24 October 2014 (aged 71); Vallentuna, Sweden
- Occupation: Actress
- Years active: 1969–2014
- Partner: Lars Naumburg
- Children: 2, including Tintin Anderzon

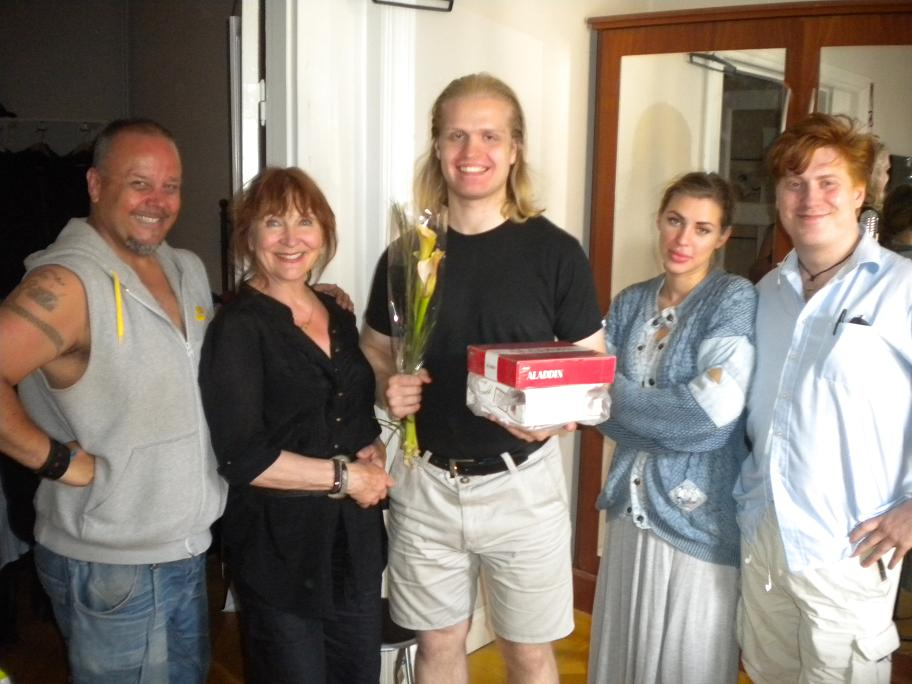
Anderzon with Yaiya and other Swedish entertainment people after a studio recording session in 2012

Kerstin Kristina Birgitta "Kim" Anderzon (20 March 1943 – 24 October 2014) was a Swedish actress active in film and theatre.

== Early life and career ==
At the age of sixteen, Anderzon moved to Stockholm, where she pursued an education as a cartographer, with which she worked for a while before her acting career took over. She started taking acting classes at Inge Wærn's theatre studio. In 1969, she started acting at Pistolteatern. In the same year she made her stage debut in the play Direktör Ubu. She later had roles in the plays Åh, vad revolutionen är härlig!!... (1974), Vi betalar inte! Vi betalar inte! (1977), and En kvinna (1979). She won the award for Best Actress at the 19th Guldbagge Awards for her role in Second Dance. Along with Tomas Bolme, she co-hosted the 27th Guldbagge Awards.

== Personal life ==
Anderzon has two children, actress Anna Catharina Tintin Anderzon, and Andrej Anderzon Möller.

Anderzon died of spinal cancer in her home on 24 October 2014.

== Partial filmography ==
- Miss and Mrs Sweden (1969)
- The Indelicate Balance (1969) - Karin / Harald's wife
- Kyrkoherden (1970) - Agneta
- Midsommardansen (1971) - Raija
- Badjävlar (1971, TV Movie) - The Model
- En enkel melodi (1974) - Assistant
- Elvis! Elvis! (1976) - Anna-Rosa's Mother
- Sällskapsresan (1980) - Siv Åman
- Göta kanal eller Vem drog ur proppen? (1981) - Lena
- Sally och friheten (1981) - Inger
- Göta kanal eller Vem drog ur proppen? (1981) - Lena
- Skål och välkommen (1981) - Eva
- Klippet (1982) - Margit
- Gräsänklingar (1982) - Hypnosdamen
- Andra dansen (1983) - Anna
- Raskenstam (1983) - Defense Attorney
- Sköna juveler (1984) - Veronika
- Vägen till Gyllenblå! (1985, TV Mini-Series) - Kubina
- Min pappa är Tarzan (1986) - Sonja
- Ingen kan älska som vi (1988) - Boarding-house supervisor
- Ha ett underbart liv (1992) - Eva
- Blackjack (1990) - Woman at Balders Hage (uncredited)
- Rederiet (1994–2002, TV Series) - Siv Svensson
- Stannar du så springer jag (1995) - Anna Hallonlöv
- Cluedo - en mordgåta (1996, TV Series) - Linda Hamilton-Gullin
- Längtans blåa blomma (1998, TV Mini-Series) - Midwife
- Julens hjältar (1999, TV Series) - Julstjärnan
- Kärlekens språk (2004) - Emilia / Morfar's girlfriend
- Aphelium (2005)
- Göta kanal 2 – Kanalkampen (2006) - Lena
- Leende guldbruna ögon (2007, TV Mini-Series) - Eva
- Mera ur kärlekens språk (2009)
- Den Sista Dokusåpan (2012, TV Series) - Abbes Farmor
