= Sällskapsresan =

1980 Swedish comedy film

- Swedish Blu-ray cover
- Directed by: Lasse Åberg, Peter Hald
- Written by: Bo Jonsson, Lasse Åberg
- Produced by: Bo Jonsson
- Starring: Lasse Åberg; Jon Skolmen; Lottie Ejebrant; Kim Anderzon; Roland Janson; Magnus Härenstam
- Music by: Bengt Palmers
- Distributed by: SF Studios
- Release date: 22 August 1980 (Sweden)
- Running time: 107 minutes
- Country: Sweden
- Language: Swedish

Sällskapsresan (English: The Charter Trip) or with subtitle included Sällskapsresan eller Finns det svenskt kaffe på grisfesten? (The Charter Trip, or: Is there Swedish Coffee at the Pig-Festival?) is a Swedish comedy film which was released to cinemas in Sweden on 22 August 1980, and the first in a series directed by Lasse Åberg. The film has reached cult status in Sweden and a vast number of the Swedish people have seen it, and many of the lines in the movie are known and referenced frequently by many Swedes. It was entered into the 12th Moscow International Film Festival.

== Plot ==
The plot follows an old-fashioned, nerdy Swede, Stig-Helmer Olsson (Lasse Åberg), who travels to the fictional town of Nueva Estocolmo in Gran Canaria. Before the trip, he meets with a psychiatrist, Dr. B. A:son Levander (Magnus Härenstam), for treatment of his fear of flying. Levander then cons him into smuggling money for another tourist, Gösta Angerud (Roland Janson), by asking Stig-Helmer to deliver a Christmas present to Levander's aunt in Nueva Estocolmo. At the airport in Sweden, Stig-Helmer meets and befriends a man from Norway, Ole Bramserud (Jon Skolmen). Among the other tourists are Angerud, the single sisters Maj-Britt (Lottie Ejebrant) and Siv (Kim Anderzon), the heavy drinkers Berra (Sven Melander) and Robban (Weiron Holmberg), who throughout the movie search for a liquor store named Pepe's Bodega; and the newlywed and camera-enthusiastic Storch couple.

== Cast ==
- Lasse Åberg – Stig-Helmer Olsson
- Jon Skolmen – Ole Bramserud
- Lottie Ejebrant – Maj-Britt Lindberg
- Kim Anderzon – Siv Åman
- Ted Åström – Lasse Lundberg
- Weiron Holmberg – Robban Söderberg
- Sven Melander – Berra Ohlsson
- Svante Grundberg – Herr Storch
- Eva Örn – Fru Storch
- Roland Janson – Gösta Angerud
- Magnus Härenstam – Dr B. A:son Levander
- Gösta Ekman (uncredited) – Hotel Maid

== Reception ==
The film has become a classic in Sweden, though it was not well received by Swedish critics at the time of release. Jan Aghed from Sydsvenska Dagbladet wrote "There are many funny gags in the beginning, and the film is very funny until the travellers have reached their destination. The film then goes on very slowly in poor humor and boredom." The film became a box-office success with over 2 million people watching the film, making it the most watched Swedish cinema-film in Sweden as of 2023.

== Sequels ==
The success of the film spawned a series of films about the character Stig-Helmer, mostly making fun of Swedish vacation activities:

- Sällskapsresan 2 – Snowroller (1985)
- SOS – En segelsällskapsresa (1988)
- Den ofrivillige golfaren (1991)
- Hälsoresan – En smal film av stor vikt (1999)
- The Stig-Helmer Story (2011)

The film was adapted into a musical, also named Sällskapsresan, in 2015. Sven Melander reprised his role from 1980.
