= Sällskapsresan 2 – Snowroller =

1985 Swedish comedy film

Sällskapsresan 2 - Snowroller
- Poster
- Directed by: Lasse Åberg, Peter Hald
- Written by: Bo Jonsson, Lasse Åberg
- Starring: Lasse Åberg, Jon Skolmen, Staffan Ling
- Distributed by: Svensk Filmindustri
- Release date: 4 October 1985 (Sweden)
- Running time: 91 minutes
- Country: Sweden
- Languages: Swedish; German; English

Sällskapsresan 2 – Snowroller (English: The Conducted Tour 2 - Snowroller) is a Swedish comedy film which was released to cinemas in Sweden on 4 October 1985, directed by Lasse Åberg and Peter Hald. It is a sequel to Sällskapsresan and the second film of the series of the same name.

== Synopsis ==
The film is about the Swede Stig-Helmer and his Norwegian friend Ole going to the alps, where a lot of crazy things happens during a ski-vacation.

== Cast ==
- Lasse Åberg - Stig Helmer Olsson
- Jon Skolmen - Ole Bramserud
- Björn Granath - Mr. Jönsson
- Staffan Ling - Hedlund
- Cecilia Walton - Lotta
- Eva Millberg - Kärran
- Ingrid Wallin - Mrs Jönsson
- Klasse Möllberg - Mackan
- Bengt Andersson - Brännström
- Jan Waldekranz - Nalle
- Oscar Franzén - Niklas Jönsson
- Erica Larsson - Sara Jönsson
- Felix S:t Clair - Felix
- Dieter Augustin - Dr. Katz
- David Kehoe - Algernon Wickham-Twistleton-Ffykes ("Algy")
- Barbro Hiort af Ornäs - Stig-Helmer's mother
