= SOS – En segelsällskapsresa =

1988 film by Lasse Åberg

SOS - En segelsällskapsresa
- Directed by: Lasse Åberg
- Written by: Bo Jonsson, Lasse Åberg
- Produced by: Bo Jonsson
- Starring: Lasse Åberg, Jon Skolmen, Johan Rabaeus
- Distributed by: Svensk Filmindustri
- Release date: 25 December 1988 (Sweden)
- Running time: 104 minutes
- Country: Sweden
- Language: Swedish
- Box office: 1.3 million admissions (Sweden)

SOS – En segelsällskapsresa (S.O.S. - A Sailing Conduct Tour), released in some English speaking territories as Swedes at Sea, is a Swedish comedy film which was released to cinemas in Sweden on 25 December 1988, and directed by Lasse Åberg. It is the third film in the Sällskapsresan film series.

== Synopsis ==
The outgoing Norwegian art director in billboard advertising, Ole (Skolmen) takes his friend, the socially more cautious electric toaster quality inspector Stig-Helmer (Åberg) to a Stockholm midsummer costume party. The way home takes a wrong turn and the two friends are springboarded through an involuntary cruise on a garbage barge (Note: à la the Mobro 4000) via an upper class financier's summer party at Saltnäs in the Stockholm archipelago to the idyllic island, Stråholmen, threatened by unscrupulous investors and a bent municipal board member's secret and foul development plans.

On the journey, the film takes the viewer through a virtual catalog of the more or less expensive and/or self inflicted mishaps which leisure sailors may call upon themselves in the Stockholm archipelago during the summer.

Events culminate with a match race between two 12 Metre yachts, the Kookaburra II and the New Sweden being disrupted somewhat by an unidentified undersea vessel (Note: being a running gag and a Chekhov's gun throughout the film)

== Cast ==
- Lasse Åberg as Stig-Helmer Olsson
- Jon Skolmen as Ole Bramserud
- Birgitte Söndergaard as Anna-Vera
- Tor Isedal as Stråholmaren
- Ewa Fröling as Madeleine "Madde" Abrahamsen - Henkan's wife
- Johan Rabaeus as Henrik "Henkan" Abrahamsen - investor
- Per Eggers as Kaj "Kajan" Björkhagen - investor
- Sten Ljunggren as Didrik - investor
- Barbro Hiort af Ornäs as Stig-Helmer's mother

== Reception ==
The film was the most popular film of 1989 in Sweden with 1.3 million admissions.
