= Den ofrivillige golfaren =

1991 Swedish comedy film

- DVD cover
- Directed by: Lasse Åberg
- Written by: Bo Jonsson, Lasse Åberg
- Produced by: Bo Jonsson
- Starring: Lasse Åberg; Jon Skolmen; Mats Bergman; Hege Schøyen; Jimmy Logan; Margo Gunn
- Distributed by: Svensk Filmindustri
- Release date: 25 December 1991 (Sweden)
- Running time: 107 minutes
- Country: Sweden
- Languages: Swedish; English

Den ofrivillige golfaren, also known in English as The Accidental Golfer and The Involuntary Golfer, is a Swedish comedy film and the fourth installment of the popular Sällskapsresan series directed by Lasse Åberg. It was released to cinemas in Sweden on 25 December 1991. Åberg won the award for Best Actor in a leading role at the 27th Guldbagge Awards. It is the fourth film in the Sällskapsresan film series and was inspired by the golf stories of author P. G. Wodehouse.

== Plot ==
The business cycle in Sweden is booming. Hapless Stig-Helmer Olsson (Lasse Åberg) is laid off from a toaster factory and gets an offer to play a one-on-one golf competition against a wealthy man for money, something he has never done before. He travels to Scotland to learn to play golf, taking lessons by the skilled golf veteran Roderic McDougall (Jimmy Logan).

== Cast ==
- Lasse Åberg as Stig-Helmer Olsson
- Jon Skolmen as Ole Bramserud
- Jimmy Logan as Roderic McDougall
- Margo Gunn as Fiona McDougall
- Barbro Hiort af Ornäs as Stig-Helmer's mother
- Claes Månsson as Scientist
- Mats Bergman as Bruno Anderhage
- Annalisa Ericson as Alice
- John Fiske as TV-host
- Sydney Coulson as Malcolm
- Lovisa Bogg-Lindkvist as Anderhage's daughter
- Simon Bogg-Lindkvist as Anderhage's son
- Ulf Eklund as Tom

== Reception ==
The film had a record opening weekend in Sweden with 153,992 admissions. Its one of the most seen Swedish movies ever in the cinemas.
