= Roland Janson =

Swedish actor (1939–2019)

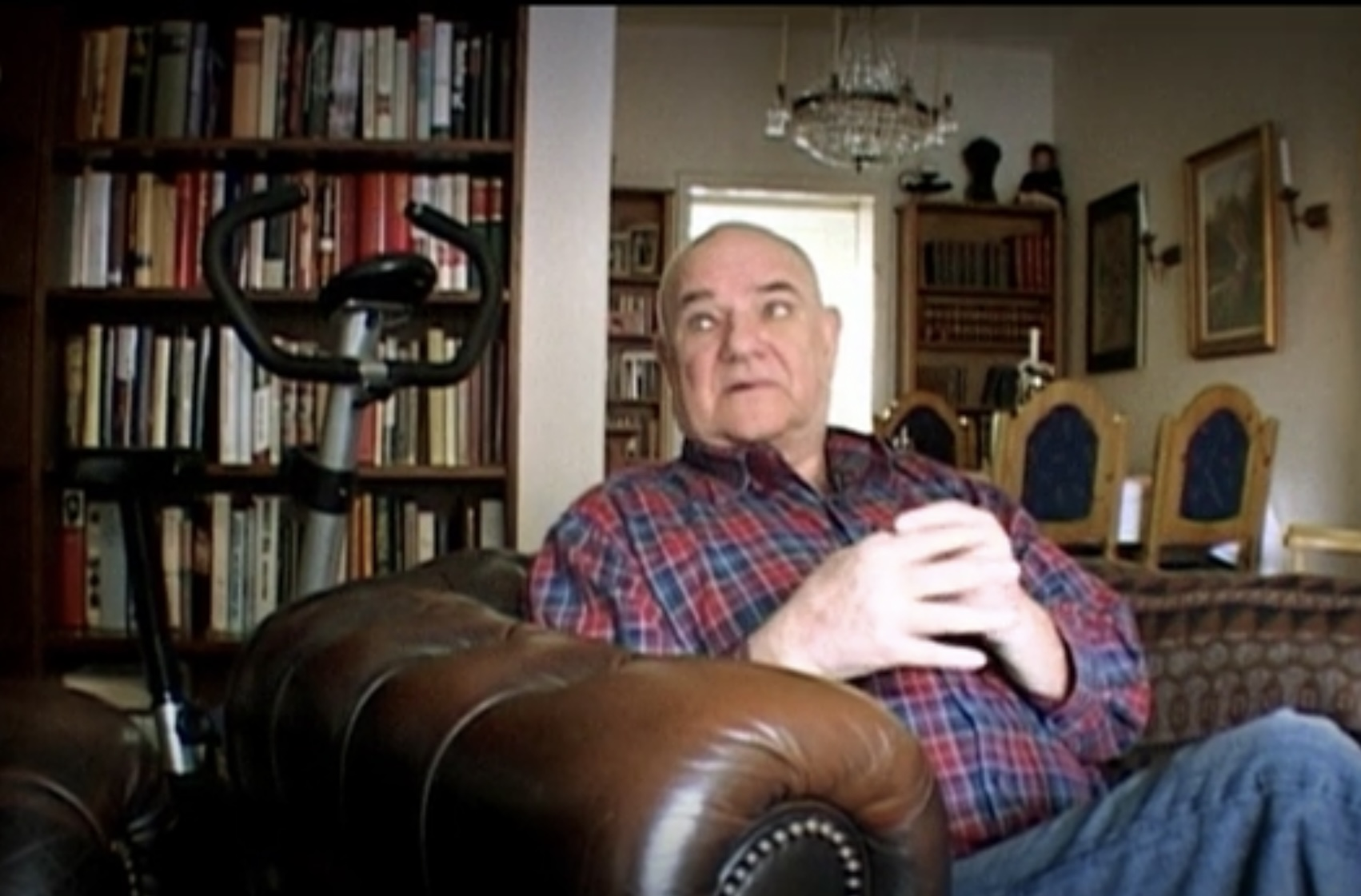
- Born: 5 September 1939; Gamlestads church parish
- Died: 8 October 2019; Göteborgs Vasa

Åke Roland Janson (5 September 1939 – 8 October 2019) was a Swedish actor. In 2010 Janson published his memoirs called Nackspärrarnas rike. He was perhaps best known for his role in the Sällskapsresan film. He was born and died in Gothenburg.

== Partial filmography ==
- 1945: Fram för lilla Märta eller På livets ödesvägar - Tor, Granlund's Younger Son (uncredited)
- 1954: Dans på rosor - Helge, photographer (uncredited)
- 1969: Den vilda jakten på likbilen - Algot
- 1976: Det löser sig (TV Movie) - Sune
- 1978: Lyftet - Roland Bergström
- 1980: Sällskapsresan - Gösta Angerud
- 1980: Jackpot (TV Movie) - Burt
- 1980: Attentatet
- 1981: Sista budet - Union Leader
- 1981: Fem dagar i december (TV Mini-Series) - Journalist
- 1981: Tuppen - Holger
- 1982: Dubbelsvindlarna (TV Mini-Series) - Karl Hansson
- 1982: En flicka på halsen - Felix
- 1982: Time Out (TV Mini-Series) - Sven Lindgren
- 1982: Klippet - Kåge
- 1982: Gräsänklingar - Polis
- 1982: Albert & Herberts julkalender (TV Series) - Malte 'Mallgrodan' Larsson
- 1982: Flygande service (TV Mini-Series) - Stryparn
- 1983: Jacob Smitaren - Jacob Andersson
- 1983: Nilla (TV Mini-Series) - Janitor (1983)
- 1983: Profitörerna (TV Mini-Series) - Bilskojaren
- 1983: Lyckans ost - Bertil
- 1984: Äntligen!
- 1986: Gröna gubbar från Y.R. - Finkelstein
- 1989: Hassel – Offren (TV Movie) - Birger Flink
- 1989: Jönssonligan på Mallorca - Brorsan
- 1990: Villan
- 1990–1991: Storstad (TV Series) - Torsten Eriksson
- 1991: Tre kärlekar (TV Series) - Staff Sergeant
- 1992: Ha ett underbart liv - Car cleaner
- 1993: Fredrikssons fabrik (TV Series) - Herr Svensson
- 1993: Den gråtande ministern (TV Mini-Series) - Taxichauffören
- 1994: Läckan (TV Mini-Series) - Jonte
- 1994: Rederiet (TV Series) - Gösta
- 1994–1995: Rena rama Rolf (TV Series) - Arne Westin
- 1995: Du bestämmer (TV Series)
- 1996: Rusar i hans famn - Karl-Olof
- 1997: Förmannen som försvann (TV Series)
- 1997: Sjukan (TV Series) - Policeman
- 1998: När karusellerna sover (TV Series) - Ronald Brötehög
- 2002–2006: Hem till byn (TV Series) - Grus-Olle (final appearance)
- 2003: Ägget (Short) - Morfar
- 2004: Blåljus (Short) - Roland
- 2008: Sten för sten
- 2009: Hemligheten (Documentary) - Himself

== Bibliography ==
- Janson, Roland (2010). Nackspärrarnas rike: en tidsresa och scener från psykiatriska kliniken. Göteborg: Lindelöw. Libris. ISBN 9789185379316
