= Börje Nyberg =

Swedish actor (1920–2005)

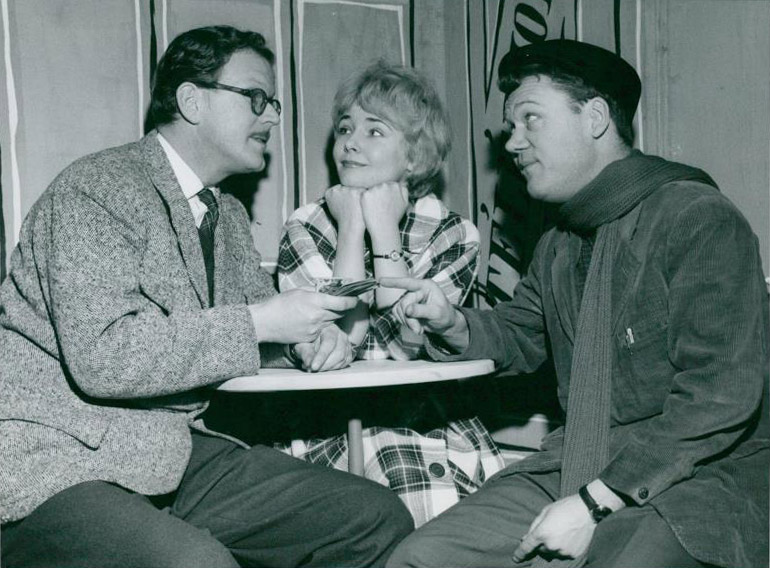
- Börje Nyberg (left), Lena Granhagen and Olof Thunberg sit at a table in a sidewalk cafe, in Intiman's performance of 'The Egg'.
- Born: 26 March 1920; Stockholm, Sweden
- Died: 2 May 2005 (aged 85); Stockholm, Sweden
- Occupations: Actor, film director
- Years active: 1947-1996

Börje Nyberg (26 March 1920 – 2 May 2005) was a Swedish actor and film director. He appeared in more than 40 films and television shows between 1947 and 1996.

== Selected filmography ==
- Dinner for Two (1947)
- Customs Officer Bom (1951)
- Marianne (1953)
- Dance in the Smoke (1954)
- The Jazz Boy (1958)
- I, a Lover (1966)
- Here's Your Life (1966)
- Andersson's Kalle (1972)
- Sköna juveler (1984)
