= Ted Åström =

Swedish actor

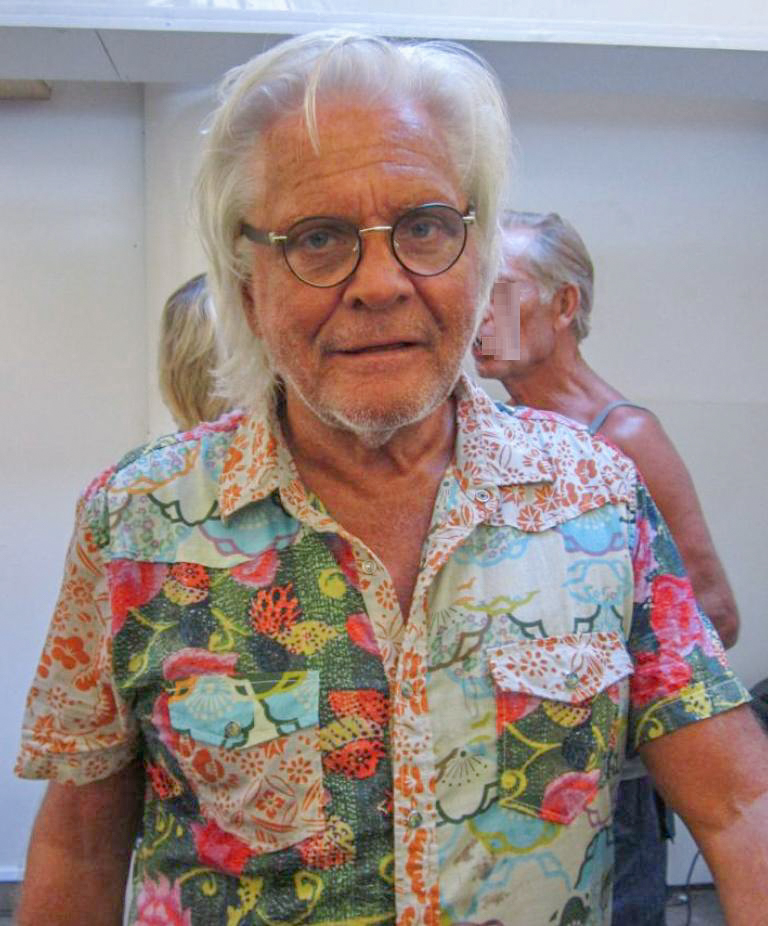
- Åström in Stockholm in July 2014.
- Born: Ted Bengt Georg Åström; 28 May 1945 (age 81); Stockholm, Sweden
- Occupation: Actor
- Years active: 1970–present

Ted Bengt Georg Åström (born 28 May 1945) is a Swedish actor. As a student Åström attended the Adolf Fredrik's Music School in Stockholm. He has appeared in more than 20 films and television shows since 1970.

He was born 28 May 1945 in the Bromma borough of Stockholm.

In 2023, he appeared in Trolltider – legenden om Bergatrollet.

== Filmography ==
Year	Title	Role	Notes
1970	Lyckliga skitar	Guy at Cuba Meeting	Uncredited
1976	Polare	Sven Risell	
1979	Repmånad	Börje Larsson	
1979	Du är inte klok, Madicken	Sotarn	
1980	Sällskapsresan	Lasse Lundberg	
1980	Madicken på Junibacken	Sotaren	
1996	Lögn	The Porter	
1996	Augustitango	Stellan	
2007	Meet the Robinsons	Cornelius/Older Lewis	Swedish version
2013	Skumtimmen	John Hagman	
2023	Trolltider – legenden om Bergatrollet		
