= Per Ragnar =

Swedish actor

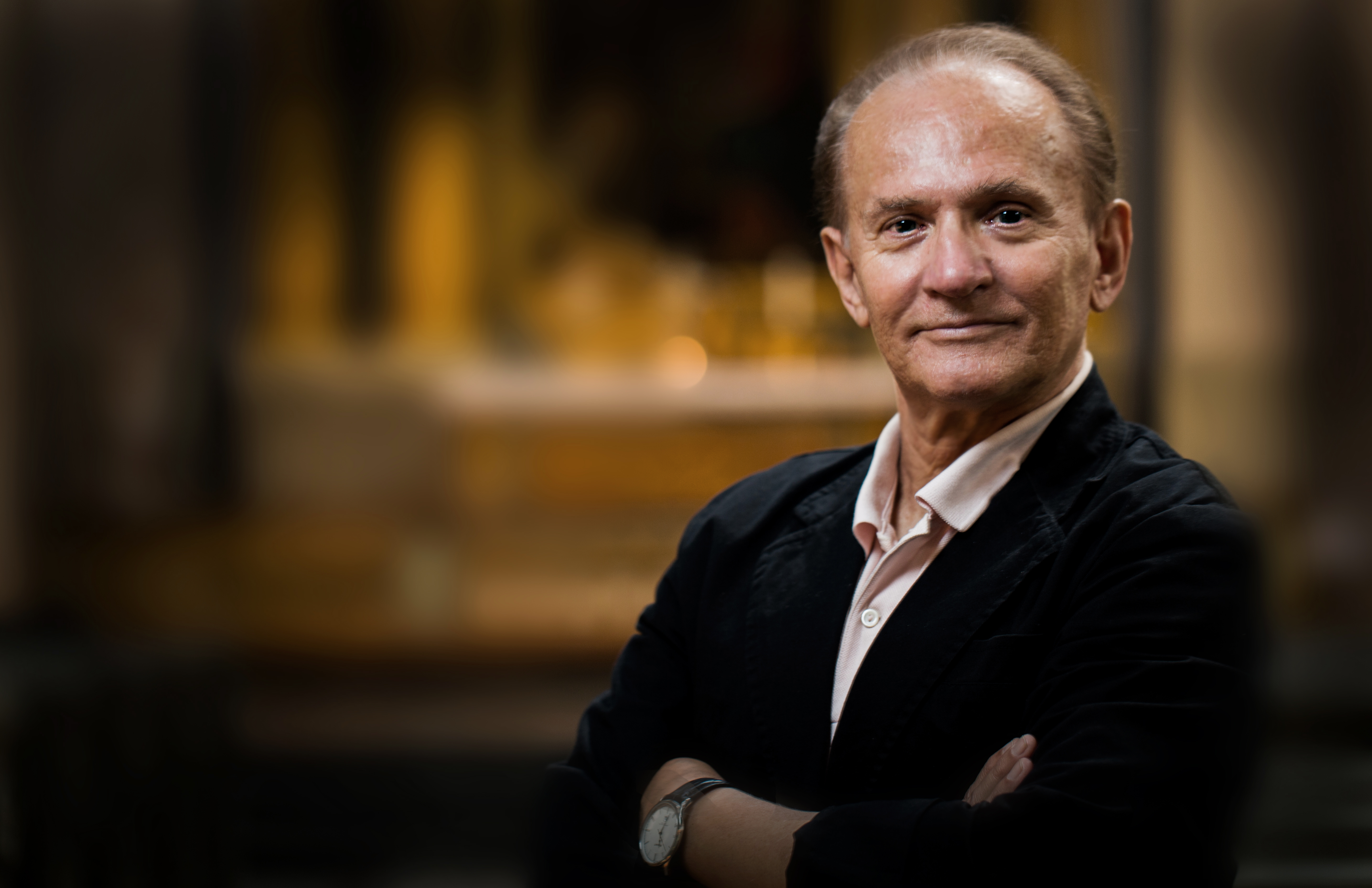
- Born: Per-Erik Ragnar; 29 May 1941 (age 84); Kalmar, Sweden
- Occupations: Actor, director, author
- Spouse: Veronica Tigerhjärta (m. 2000–2014)
- Children: 1

Per Ragnar, Per-Erik Ragnar (born 29 May 1941), is a Swedish actor, director and author.

== Biography ==
Ragnar was born in Kalmar, Sweden and is the son of district manager Hans Ragnar and the postal clerk Karin, née Pettersson. Ragnar trained at the Royal Dramatic Training Academy in 1962-65. The following year he got a job as director's assistant to Ingmar Bergman (on his stage production of Peter Weiss' play The Investigation), where Ragnar states he learned a lot on the art of acting and directing from "the master", just by watching and listening when Bergman worked with his actors and the script. In 1968 Per Ragnar had his breakthrough as an actor, earning much critical acclaim and audience praise for his performances in the Arnold Wesker "trilogy" staged that year in Sweden: Hönssoppa med korngryn (Chicken Soup with Barley), Rötter (Roots) and Jag talar om Jerusalem (I'm talking about Jerusalem). The same year he also made his film-breakthrough with Korridoren (The Corridor), Jan Haldoff's social commenting film on hospitals and the health care system in Sweden, where Ragnar plays a young doctor, new on the job, facing the dilemmas of prioritizing patients.

In the 1970s his collaborating with TV director Bengt Lagerkvist led to notable performances on TV, first as Arvid Falk in Lagerkvist's TV adaption of Strindberg's play The Red Room) (Röda rummet), and in the popular Swedish TV-series Någonstans i Sverige (~Somewhere In Sweden), a series covering the years in Sweden during the time of World War II in Europe, where Ragnar played the character of fänrik Ancker.

For a young audience today, in Sweden, he became unforgettable when playing the religious psycho Sten Frisk in the popular and long-running 1990s TV series Tre Kronor (1994) on Swedish channel TV4, a role that followed him for long and for more than a decade led to him often being typecast as evil characters and crazy psychos in various roles on film and TV. Even though being cast in a Swedish vampire film, his character of Håkan was this time a bit more complex than just "evil"; in director Tomas Alfredson's popular success feature Låt den rätte komma in (Let the Right One In) in 2008. Previously he had worked with Tomas Alfredson and his "Killinggänget" group in their film En liten film.. (A Little Film..) in 1999, where he had a small key part as an absent-minded boss.

Being versatile in the entertainment field, Per Ragnar has also worked as a TV presenter and host for the Swedish morning show Gomorron Sverige! (Good Morning Sweden!). He has also written a number of books, including a book on Hitler and his closed community of friends and party members, and one on Martin Luther's Christian philosophy. His most recent book is called Om bland tusen stjärnor: en tankebok om döden (~Among Thousand Stars: A Book On Death), which deals with how differently all of us deals with – and approaches – the subject of death; children and adults, different religions; scientifically, spiritually and logically.

Per Ragnar is also an appreciated lecturer and gives many lectures and public readings around Sweden, in various assembly halls; both on acting and around the subjects from his books and research. He is a longtime vegetarian and an outspoken pacifist, inspired by Mohandas Karamchand Gandhi's non-violence philosophy. He is also attracted to the ideas and concept of Martinus cosmology.

In 2009 he will play the character of Emperor Zing, Master of The Universe, in the Swedish children's sci-fi film feature Kenny Begins, a film adaption of the popular Swedish children's TV-series Kenny Starfighter; about the space super hero Kenny Starfighter.

Per Ragnar was married to Veronica Tigerhjärta from October 2000 to 2014. He has one daughter (born 2001).

== Selected filmography ==
- Korridoren (1968)
- Tre Kronor (1994) (TV-series)
- Under ytan (1997)
- The Last Contract (1998)
- Storm (2005)
- Let the Right One In (2008)
- Psalm 21 (2009)
- Kenny Begins (2009)
- Faust 2.0 (2014)

== Books ==
- Om bland tusen stjärnor: en tankebok om döden (2009)
- Så tänker mitt hjärta (2006)
- Hitler: Hans folk (2006)
- Till min älskade dotter (2002)
- Luther: död eller levande (2000)
- Du som är: meditationer och dikter (1999)
- När ska jag ha tid att leva (1996)
- Hitler (1994)
- Datorer - herrar eller tjänare (1980)
- Sommar vid Bråviken: Dikter (1980)
- Därför är jag vegetarian (1976)
- Julresan (1973)
- Brevet till mormor (1972)
