= Hälsoresan – En smal film av stor vikt =

1999 film

Hälsoresan - En smal film av stor vikt
- DVD cover
- Directed by: Lasse Åberg
- Written by: Bo Jonsson, Lasse Åberg
- Produced by: Bo Jonsson
- Starring: Lasse Åberg, Jon Skolmen
- Music by: Björn J:son Lindh, Janne Schaffer
- Distributed by: Svensk Filmindustri
- Release date: 25 December 1999 (Sweden/Norway)
- Running time: 105 minutes
- Country: Sweden
- Language: Swedish

Hälsoresan – En smal film av stor vikt (English: The Health Conduct Tour - A Thin Film With Great Importance) is a Swedish comedy film, which was released to cinemas on 25 December 1999 and directed by Lasse Åberg. It is the fifth film in the Sällskapsresan film series.

== Synopsis ==
The film is about the health resort Granhedsgården in Dalarna, Sweden, and they have a problem. They don't have many guests at all and something must be done. At the same time, Stig-Helmer is a little depressed after his Scottish girlfriend Fiona left him, and so he lives on junk food. His best friend Ole invites him to come along to the health resort Granhedsgården. Now, the craziness begins.

== Cast ==
- Lasse Åberg as Stig-Helmer Olsson
- Jon Skolmen as Ole Bramserud
- Magnus Härenstam as Dr. Levander
- Barbro Hiort af Ornäs as Stig-Helmer's mother

== Reception ==
It opened in Sweden on Christmas Day, grossing a record 9,430,427 Swedish krona ($1.1 million) in its first two days from 135,851 admissions. It opened the same day in Norway but did not perform as well, finishing third at the box office.
