= Lasse Åberg =

Swedish actor, musician, film director and artist

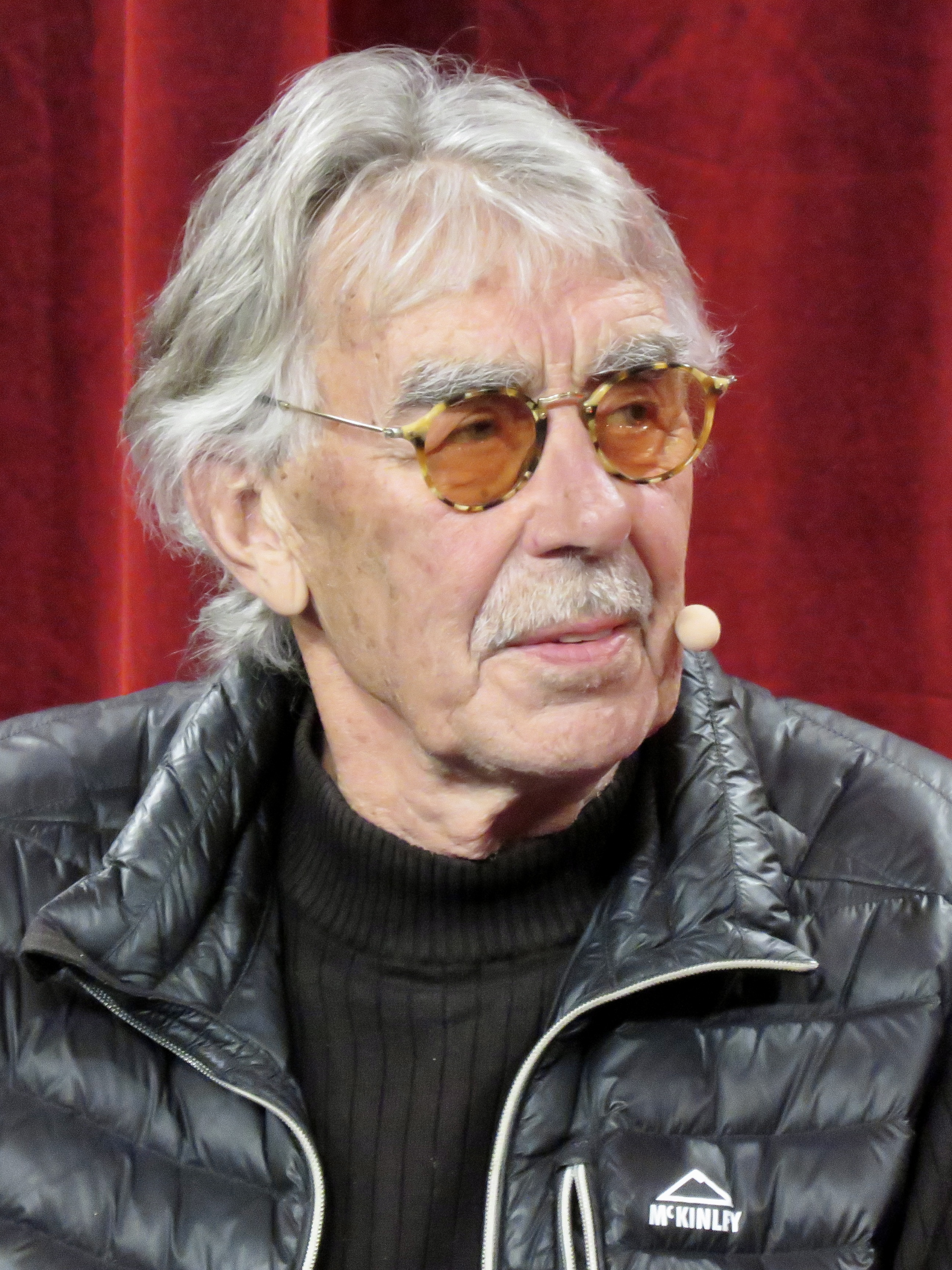
- Åberg in 2023
- Born: Lars Gunnar Åberg; 5 May 1940 (age 86); Hofors, Sweden
- Occupations: Actor; musician; film director; artist
- Spouse: Inger Jönsson (m. 1965; died 2024)

Lars Gunnar Åberg (born 5 May 1940), known professionally as Lasse Åberg, is a Swedish comedian, actor, musician, film director and artist. Between 1960 and 1964 he studied at the Konstfack department of graphic design.

Åberg has produced some of the most successful films in Sweden, depicting "typical" Swedish life and customs in a usually humorous way. Åberg's character can be described as an inept outsider with a large heart, constantly pushed aside without noticing.

His films have generated over 300 million Swedish kronor (~29 million USD) in Sweden alone; no large scale international distribution has ever been attempted. His 1980 film Sällskapsresan entered into the 12th Moscow International Film Festival and is the first in a series of films of the same name about his character Stig-Helmer Olsson.

As an artist, he is famous for making various lithographs, with one of his specialties being sketchy Mickey Mouse pastiches. He is a member of Svenska Serieakademien. Additionally, he re-designed the seat textiles for the Stockholm Metro subway in the 1990s.

As a musician, he played in the nationally successful comedy children's band Electric Banana Band. Åberg is also the creator of Trazan & Banarne, one of the most beloved Swedish children's shows ever. It was shown on Sveriges Television in the late 1970s/early 1980s. The characters of the show, Trazan Apansson (Åberg) and Banarne (Klasse Möllberg) are also members of the Electric Banana Band.

At the 17th Guldbagge Awards he won the Ingmar Bergman Award. At the 27th Guldbagge Awards he won the award for Best Actor for his role in Den ofrivillige golfaren.

== Filmography ==
=== Film ===
Year	Title	Role	Notes
1966	Oj oj oj eller Sången om den eldröda hummern	Freer	
1967	Ola & Julia	Waiter	
1968	Lejonsommar	Gunnar	
1972	47:an Löken blåser på	General Painriche	
1976	Husmors filmer våren 1976	—N/a	
1977	Söndagsseglaren	—N/a	Writer, director
1978	Snacka om energi!	—N/a	Short film, director
1979	Repmånad	Helge Jonsson	Writer, director
1980	Sällskapsresan	Stig-Helmer Olsson	Writer, director
1981	Montenegro eller Pärlor och svin	The customs inspector	
1983	Kalabaliken i Bender	Ensign Gustaf Lagercrona	
1985	Sällskapsresan 2 – Snowroller	Stig-Helmer Olsson	Writer, director
1988	S.O.S. – En segelsällskapsresa	Stig-Helmer Olsson	Writer, director
1988	Folk och rövare i Kamomilla stad	Drummer Hagerup	
1991	Den ofrivillige golfaren	Stig-Helmer Olsson	Writer, director
1993	Minns Ni?	—N/a	Short film
1998	EBB the movie	Trazan Apansson	Concert film
1999	Hälsoresan – En smal film av stor vikt	Stig-Helmer Olsson	Writer, director
2011	The Stig-Helmer Story	Stig-Helmer Olsson	Writer, director
2013	Skepp ohoj	—N/a	Documentary short

=== Television ===
Year	Title	Role	Notes
1974	Se upp i backen	—N/a	
1984	Zvampen	Himself (host)	Writer, director
2018	Sjölyckan	Gösta	
2019	Renées brygga	Himself	
2019	Barncancergalan	Himself	

== Bibliography ==
- Åberg L.; Bessière C. (1984). Lasses klokbok för vetgiriga barn. Brombergs bokförlag. ISBN 9176081664.
- Telegin M. L.; Meijer M.; Larsson I. (1985). Ölvännernas matbok. Informationsförlaget. ISBN 9177360958.
- Åberg, Lasse (1988). Två lösa Boy och Rekordmagasinet. Bokförlaget Atlantis. ISBN 9174862340.
- Åberg, Lasse (2003). En skridskobanan på skridskobanan: En bok om ord som är lika som bär men bär olika betydelse. Brombergs bokförlag. ISBN 9176089258.
- Åberg, Lasse (2008). Souvenirer: en inblick i den exotiska formvärld som flyger under esteternas radar. Kartago förlag. ISBN 9789186003029.
- Åberg, Lasse (2011). The Stig-Helmer Stories. Bulls Presstjänst AB. ISBN 9789163387913.
