= Weinstein effect =

Famous or powerful figures facing sexual misconduct allegations

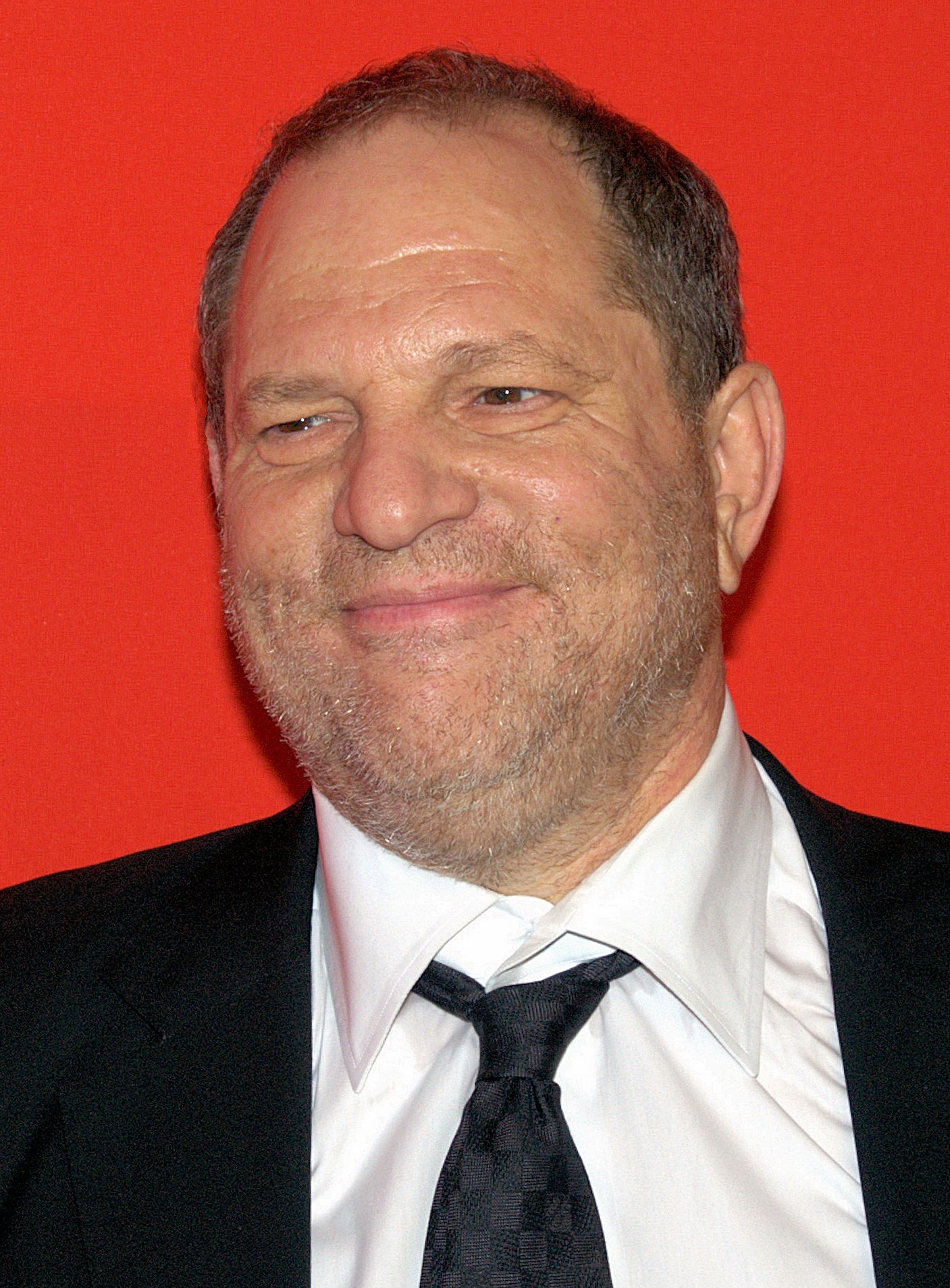
Harvey Weinstein, a producer convicted of sexual misconduct

The Weinstein effect is the phenomenon in which famous or powerful figures previously thought to be immune from most consequences due to their fame are later accused or convicted of sexual abuse, harassment, or misconduct. The term "Weinstein effect" came into use in October 2017, when media outlets began reporting on sexual abuse perpetrated by film producer Harvey Weinstein.

The effect is closely related to the #MeToo movement and contributed to the movement’s growth. The two events are categorized by a cascade of allegations of abuse, harassment, and misconduct against many notable figures such as Richard Dreyfuss, Sean Combs, R. Kelly, Kevin Spacey, Charlie Rose, Louis C.K., Dustin Hoffman, Matt Lauer, John Lasseter, Danny Masterson, John Kricfalusi, Dan Schneider, T.J. Miller, Bill Cosby, Charlie Sheen, Justin Roiland, Neil Gaiman, Russell Brand, Gary Glitter, Les Moonves, Garrison Keillor, Chris Savino, Vic Mignogna, Asia Argento, David Walliams, U.S. Representative John Conyers, U.S. Senator Al Franken, former Senate candidate and Chief Justice of the Alabama Supreme Court Roy Moore, U.S. Associate Justice Brett Kavanaugh, and Welsh politician Carl Sargeant.

== History ==
=== Background ===
In July 2016, Fox News television host Gretchen Carlson filed a lawsuit against the station's chairman Roger Ailes, which led to his removal and encouraged journalists to pursue rumors about Weinstein's conduct and political commentator Bill O'Reilly. Similar revelations and a lawsuit led to O'Reilly being fired in April 2017. Both Ailes (who died in May 2017) and O'Reilly denied any wrongdoing.

On October 5, 2017, The New York Times broke the first reports of decades of sexual misconduct claims against film producer Harvey Weinstein. On October 10, 2017, journalist Ronan Farrow reported further allegations that Weinstein had sexually assaulted or harassed thirteen, and raped three women.

Weinstein was immediately dismissed from The Weinstein Company, expelled from the Academy of Motion Picture Arts and Sciences and other professional associations. Weinstein had suppressed these cases through confidential financial settlements and nondisclosure agreements, as was common for celebrity sexual harassment cases, before journalists aired the story. Over eighty accusers came forward against him, including many well-known actresses.

=== Impact ===
Jim Rutenberg of The New York Times said that the Weinstein scandal precipitated a "national reckoning" against sexual harassment and assault in the United States, which became known as the Weinstein effect. USA Today wrote that 2017 was the year in which "sexual misconduct became a fireable offense".

Women and men aired claims of sexual misconduct in workplaces across multiple industries, leading to the swift international condemnation or removal of many people in positions of power. On Twitter, the #MeToo campaign also encouraged hundreds of thousands of people to share their stories.

Examples of the Weinstein effect are numerous. Many notable people in entertainment and music have been implicated:

- Television producers Dan Schneider, Mark Schwahn, Brian Peck, Peter Aalbæk Jensen, Andrew Kreisberg, and Alfonso Signorini
- Animators John Lasseter, John Kricfalusi, Chris Savino, Kyle A. Carrozza, Bolhem Bouchiba, (Note: Sentenced to 25 years in prison.) Skyler Page, (Note: Although was already fired in 2014, admitted that the allegations were true in 2021.) Julia Vickerman, and Justin Roiland
- Actors such as Russell Brand, (Note: Convicted of rape.) Bill Cosby, Ben Affleck, Casey Affleck, Kevin Spacey, Jeffrey Tambor, James Franco, Jonah Hill, Richard Dreyfuss, Micheal Ward, Cuba Gooding Jr., Louis C.K., Tyler Perry, Danny Masterson, Chris Noth, Gérard Depardieu, Austin Wolf, Ron Jeremy, Jamie Foxx, T.J. Miller, Thomas Middleditch, Fred Savage, Jason Hervey, Timothy Busfield, Woody Allen, Warren Beatty, Bill Murray, Demetrius Grosse, and Dustin Hoffman
- R&B singer R. Kelly (Note: Convicted of sex trafficking.)
- Writer Neil Gaiman
- Professional wrestling promoter Vince McMahon
- YouTubers Toby Turner, Andrew Callaghan, Ava Kris Tyson, Andy Signore, and EDP445
- Voice actors Vic Mignogna and Chris Niosi
- Footballer Cristiano Ronaldo (Note: Despite being accused of rape, the case was dismissed in 2022.)
- Musician Austin Jones
- Manga creator Shōichi Yamamoto
- Countertenor David Daniels
- Conductor/pianist James Levine
- Composer Jeremy Soule
- Filmmakers such as Bob Weinstein, (Note: Younger brother of Harvey.) Francis Ford Coppola, Bryan Singer, Brett Ratner, Morgan Spurlock, Max Landis, Paul Schrader, Justin Baldoni, James Toback, and Rob Cohen
- Magician David Blaine

American rapper Sean "Diddy" Combs has been called "the Harvey Weinstein of the music industry".

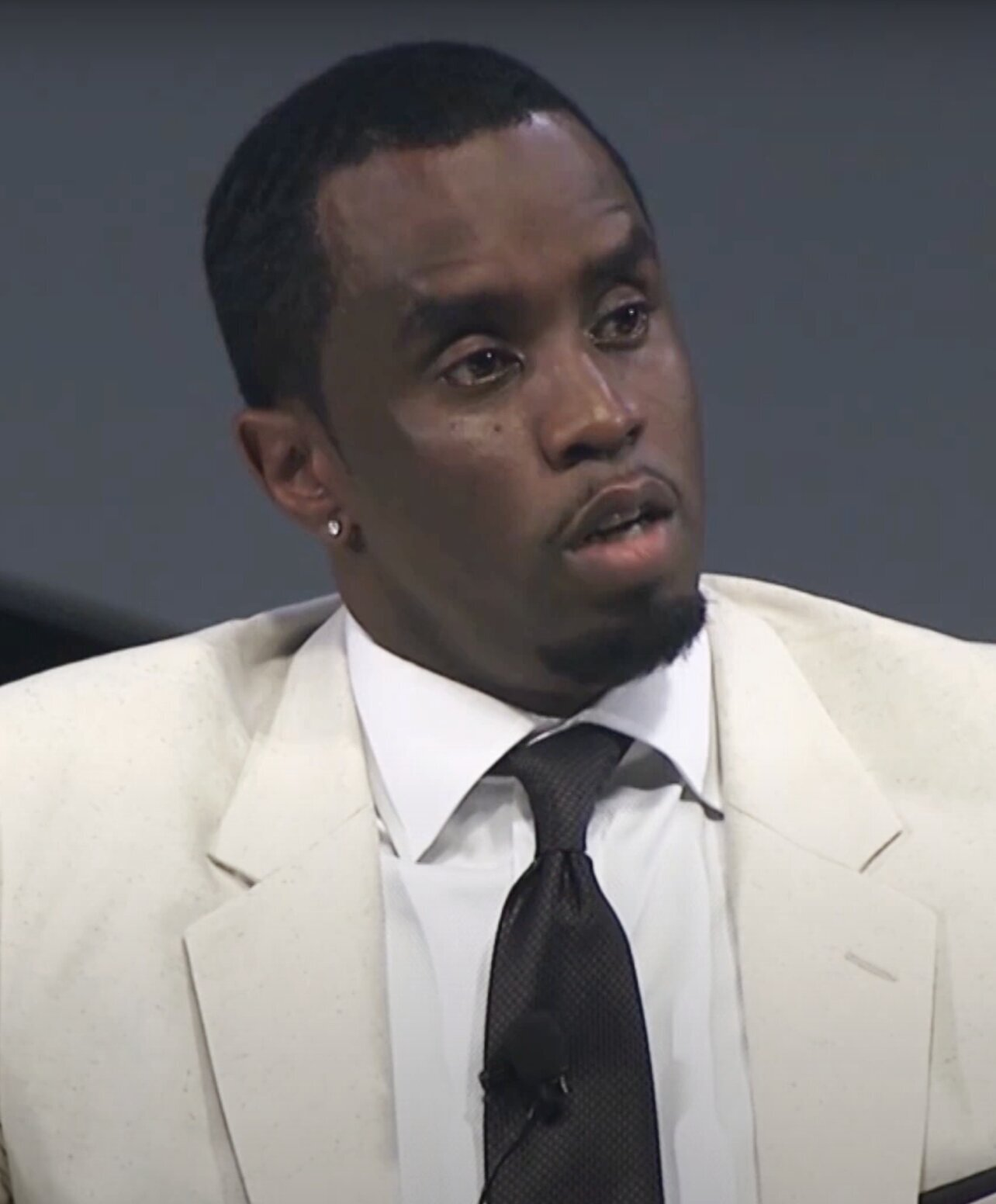
American rapper Sean "Diddy" Combs has been accused of sexual assault by multiple people and was arrested by federal agents in September 2024.

In the journalism industry, allegations led to the firing of editors, publishers, executives, and hosts, including high-profile television figures such as Charlie Rose, Mark Halperin, and Matt Lauer. In politics, accusations of varying degrees of severity were made against U.S. House Representative John Conyers (D-MI) and U.S. Senator Al Franken (D-MN), both of whom resigned their seats in Congress, and Chief Justice of the Alabama Supreme Court Roy Moore (R-AL), who lost his 2017 bid for election to the United States Senate. Celebrity chefs Mario Batali and John Besh were also removed.

In technology, the Weinstein effect went underway when Intel CEO Brian Krzanich was investigated after being accused of violating the company's anti-fraternization policy over a consensual relationship he engaged in with an employee. Regardless, although this incident was ultimately not counted as sexually violent, and with the #MeToo movement still in effect, Krzanich was ousted as Intel's CEO on June 21, 2018.

Two supporters of the #MeToo movement were also accused. CBS chairman and CEO Leslie Moonves was one of Hollywood's most prominent supporters of the movement and a founding member of the "Commission on Sexual Harassment and Advancing Equality in the Workplace", formed in late 2017 to "tackle the broad culture of abuse and power disparity". On July 27, 2018, six women, including actress Illeana Douglas, accused him of sexually harassing them. On August 19, 2018, an article published in The New York Times detailed allegations that Asia Argento sexually assaulted Jimmy Bennett, a then-17-year-old actor and musician, in a California hotel in 2013, and arranged to pay $380,000 to her accuser. Bennett was under California's age of consent, which is 18 years of age, and says he was given alcohol under the age of 21. Argento was a leading Weinstein accuser and prominent #MeToo movement leader.

The Weinstein effect was felt outside the United States, especially but not solely in the English-speaking world. In the United Kingdom, allegations of sexual misconduct against many British politicians became a public scandal involving dozens of women accusers across decades and political parties. It led to the resignations of Defence Secretary Michael Fallon, Cabinet Secretary Damian Green, and Welsh minister Carl Sargeant (who died by suicide four days after his dismissal). In January 2018, reports of sexual harassment at the high-society Presidents Club charity dinner caused another scandal. In Canada, accusations against Just for Laughs comedy festival founder Gilbert Rozon led to his resignation, and 15 people accused Quebec radio host Éric Salvail of sexual misconduct. Broadcaster and former baseball player Gregg Zaun was fired.

== Analysis ==
American journalists in conversation at NPR spoke of the allegations feeling like a tipping point for societal treatment of sexual misconduct. They distinguished the moment from prior sexual misconduct public debates by the public trust in the accusers, who in this case were celebrities familiar to the public, rather than the accusers in prior cases, in which the accusers were unknown and became famous for their testimony. Social media provides a platform for women to share their experiences and encouragement on a scale that had not existed during prior public debates. The state of California is considering legislation to ban closed door sexual harassment settlements.

Two columnists of the USA Today expressed doubt that the trend of public opinion would hold, citing open, public cases with few consequences, such as R. Kelly (the column was made before Surviving R. Kelly aired and Kelly's subsequent arrest in early 2019) and Donald Trump. The Weinstein effect also caused some to question the place of Bill Clinton within the Democratic Party due to the sexual misconduct allegations against him. Journalist Jenny Nordberg published a New York Times article in protest against the prosecution and conviction of actress Cissi Wallin, one of the many accusers of journalist Fredrik Virtanen, and her criticism of the difficulties the Me Too movement faces in Sweden.

== See also ==
- 2017–18 United States political sexual scandals
- Believe women
- Epstein files
- HimToo movement
- Jimmy Savile sexual abuse scandal
- Litigation involving Jeffrey Epstein
- Post-assault treatment of sexual assault victims
- Sexual abuse in the American film industry
- Time's Up (organization)
