= Censorship in Sweden =

Sweden protects freedom of speech in certain circumstances and was a pioneer in officially abolishing censorship. A number of restrictions remain such as child pornography, hate speech and libel. In all cases there is a legal process afterwards if applicable and no media are censored before publishing.

== Abolition of censorship ==
Sweden was in 1766 the first country to introduce a constitutional law where censorship was abolished and the freedom of the press guaranteed. The Law on the Freedom of Printing of 1766 was written by a committee of the parliament, during the Swedish Age of Liberty (Frihetstiden). This law was also the first in the world to make most documents of the state authorities open and available for the citizens. This principle from 1766 is still an important part of the Swedish Constitution, and all Freedom of Information Acts in the world have grown from an application – usually in a very diluted way – of this Swedish "principle of public availability". The most important founding father of this part of the Swedish constitution was Anders Chydenius, a Finn, who was a member of parliament in the ecclesiastical estate. The freedom of the press is also guaranteed in the Free Press Statute of 1812.

After an interlude between 1772 and 1809, with royal dictatorship and renewed suppression, the freedom of the press was reintroduced by the parliament in the Constitution of 1809–10. The constitutional prohibition against all forms of censorship before publication of books and other printed matters has since 1810 the strict formulation that is still a cornerstone of Sweden's freedom of the press. Not only is a censoring authority illegal, but also all other forms of court injunctions and other measures by the authorities to suppress or restrict a book or a paper before its publication. The injunctions that in many countries are sought by lawyers or officials, and given by the courts, to stop the publication or broadcasting of certain statements, facts or pictures are not possible in Sweden.

During the rule of king Charles XIV John the government had for a number of years power to administratively prohibit the further publication of newspapers. This was relatively easily circumvented by the press by small changes of newspapers' names, and the restrictions were abolished.

After the experiences during World War II (see below) a new Constitutional Law on the Freedom of Printing was decided by parliament in 1949. It gives a detailed constitutional protection of all steps in the production of a book or a newspaper—from the protection of sources to editing and printing through to distribution and reading. This is done by special procedural rules for trials in all cases involving the press, by trial by jury, by the requirement that no judgement of indemnity can be given unless a two-thirds majority of the jury has found the publication criminal – as well as through other rules that make it impossible for the state or for private interests to take legal action against those involved in a book or newspaper's production.

Responsibility before the law rests only on the responsible publisher of a newspaper and only on the author of a book, with secondary rules only for such cases as books with an anonymous or an unknown author. It is not possible to take legal action against reporters, sources, distributors or printers because of the content of a book or a newspaper. The Swedish Constitution in this and a number of other ways gives very strong protection for freedom of speech and the free press. Since 1992, the same level of protection is given to electronic media in a parallel Constitutional Law, although there are exceptions that allow regulation of radio and TV as well as censorship of films shown at cinemas.

Swedish law has a few criminal offences that concern misuse of the printed or spoken word. Among those is a law against hate speech. This is in Sweden seen as a crime against the state and public order, which means that legal action can be taken only by a special prosecutor who is under constitutional obligation to give special consideration to the importance of free speech for a free society.

== During World War II ==
During World War II pressure from Germany caused the Swedish government to recommend to Swedish publishers not to publish stories Germany might have found biased. Minister of Justice Karl Gustaf Westman revived an old law, long considered obsolete, that made it illegal to publish "offensive writings" about a foreign state. Ture Nerman was sentenced to three months in jail in the winter of 1939 for an anti-Hitler column in his Trots allt! (In spite of it all). Another prominent anti-fascist Israel Holmgren was sentenced to jail by a Swedish court in 1942 for his book Nazisthelvetet (The Nazi Hell). Eventually he was pardoned, and Holmgren decided to publish exactly the same book again, but with a new ironic title, this time called Nazistparadiset (The Nazi Paradise), and he was no longer stopped from publishing it.

Hermann Rauschning's book, The Voice of Destruction, was confiscated two hours after it left the press. These and other cases of suppression showed the need to strengthen the protection of the free press. A committee, with former liberal minister of justice Natanael Gärde as chairman and such well-known journalists and authors as the socialist Rolf Edberg, and the liberals Knut Petersson and Axel Brusewitz among the members, wrote a proposal for a revision of the Constitutional Law on Freedom of Printing. This introduced a far stronger protection of the distribution of news, and it was with a few changes approved by parliament.

== Film censorship ==
Sweden had a film censorship board, Statens biografbyrå, founded in 1911. Statens biografbyrå was closed down in 2011. A new board, Statens medieråd (The Swedish Media Council), have taken over the responsibility of determining the age limits for film. The censorship of film has been removed.

Statens biografbyrå oversaw censorship laws that stated that films "shall not include any material that is offensive to public decency or disrespectful to the authorities or private individuals, nor pictures depicting the commission of murders, robberies or other serious crimes, and exhibitions that are open to children shall not include pictures depicting events or situations that are liable to arouse emotions of terror or horror in the audience or for other reasons be considered unsuitable for children to look at."

All documents about the examination of films, including cut scenes, are available to the public. Some movies have been banned entirely and are not available for viewing. The list of films banned includes Nosferatu (banned for excessive horror), Mad Max and Texas Chainsaw Massacre: The Next Generation. The last mainstream film to be cut was the 1995 film Casino.

Since the abolition of Statens Biografbyrå, film censorship in Sweden has officially been removed. The new board, Statens medieråd, determines age limits for films. The age limits are 7, 11 or 15 years old. Generally movies where people are killed or assaulted have 15 as the age limit, and movies with acts of sex (even if not shown in detail) have 11 as the age limit. This differs significantly from the practice in the United States of rating films with sex more harshly than films with violence.

== Military installations ==
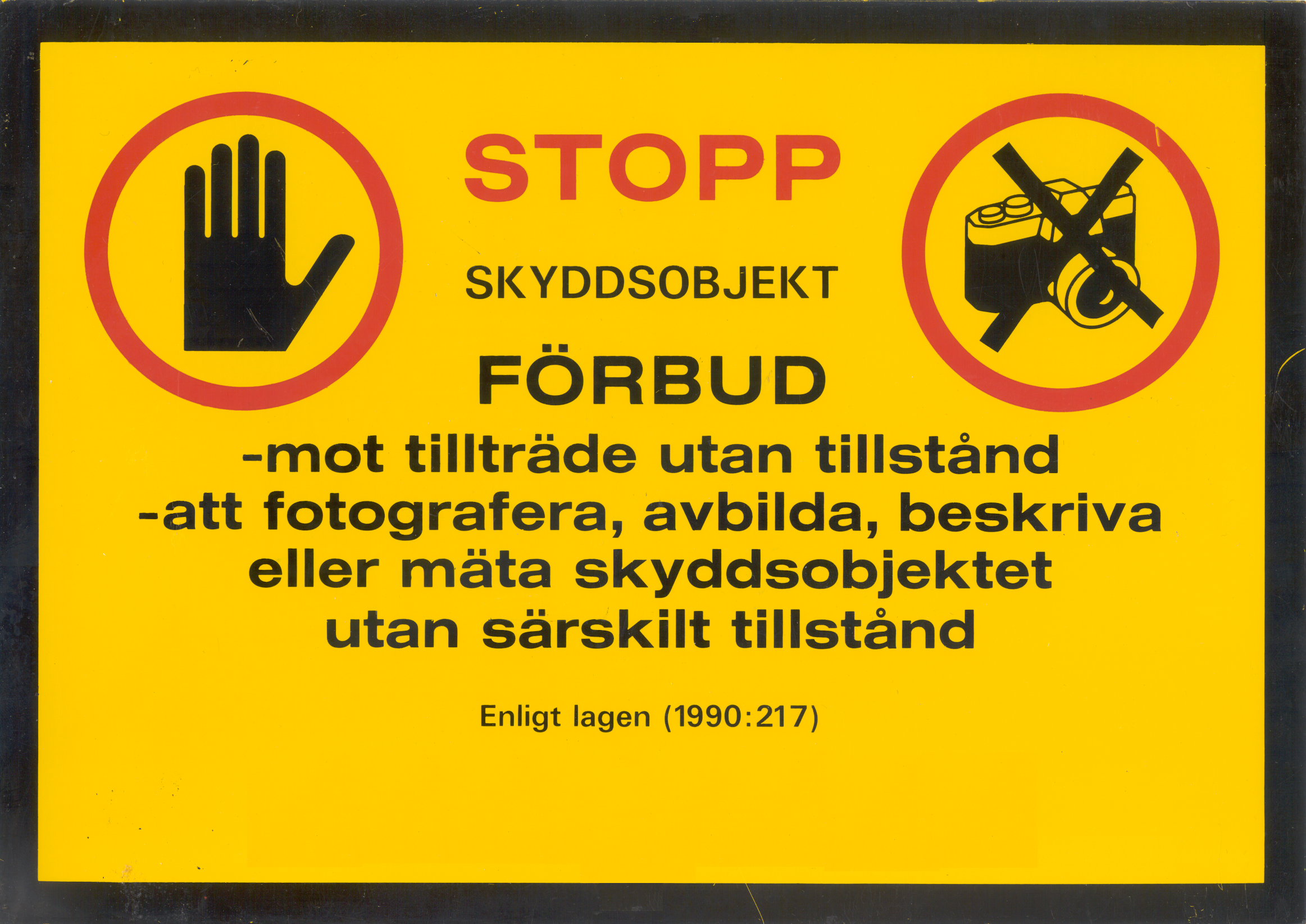
Swedish sign for an officially designated secure compound.

It is also illegal to photograph or in any way make a picture of or describe (in writing) and/or publish pictures or documents of military installations and other "protected objects" (skyddsobjekt).. The designation of "protected object" can be applied to facilities, geographical areas, ships and aircraft, when in the interest of national security.

The designation of military installations is the responsibility of the Swedish Armed Forces, while for civilian installations – such as critical infrastructure or defense contractor facilities – the responsibility for identification and designation rests with the local County Administrative Board.

Local protection (both civilian and military) has the right to confiscate and/or destroy images, documents and equipment that depicts or is used to depict the protected object/area.

== Hate speech ==
Sweden prohibits hate speech, and defines it as publicly making statements that threaten or express disrespect for an ethnic group or similar group regarding their race, skin colour, national or ethnic origin, faith or sexual orientation. These regulations are enforced in respect to posts within social media; in 2017 a 70-year-old woman was prosecuted for expressing a 'disparaging view of refugees' on Facebook where she commented on public order disturbances allegedly committed by the migrants. The law does not prohibit a pertinent and responsible debate (en saklig och vederhäftig diskussion), nor statements made in a completely private sphere. There are constitutional restrictions pertaining to which acts are criminalized, as well as limits set by the European Convention on Human Rights.

The sexual orientation provision, added in 2002, was used to convict Pentecostal pastor Åke Green of hate speech against homosexuality based on a 2003 sermon. His conviction was later overturned.

In May 2017 the Swedish Institute, government agency that maintains Sweden's official Twitter account blacklisted some 14,000 Twitter users allegedly involved in "threats against migrants, women and LGBTQ people" or who were suspected of right-wing extremism. After the public outcry that followed, the ban of the blacklisted users was lifted.

== State censorship of crime statistics ==
In 2016, the Swedish Police were accused of covering up rape and assault statistics by immigrants shortly thereafter declaring that they wouldn't include ethnic traits anymore when describing alleged criminals.

In late 2019, people working in the Brottsförebyggande Rådet, BRÅ (The Swedish National Council for Crime Prevention), stated in interviews that they were censored by the government or leading figures within BRÅ. They claim they were told to change certain crime statistics according to political pressure. In one instance a worker claims to have been called to the Justice Department of the Swedish government where the worker was told that certain parts of a report had to be "corrected". In 2002 a similar alarm about government censorship regarding crime statistics was sounded by researchers.

== Accusations and defamation ==
In Sweden, the criminal offense of denigration (ärekränkning) is regulated in Chapter 5 of the Criminal Code. There have been notable criminal prosecutions of citizens for defamation. For example, Cissi Wallin was convicted of defamation for stating that she was sexually assaulted by Fredrik Virtanen.

== Self-censorship ==
The issue of self-censorship within the media has been raised several times in the last ten years.

In 2011–2012, following a large influx of Islamic immigrants coming to Sweden, neo-Nazi Ingrid Carlqvist criticized the government's open approach and described the refugees as "dangerous"; many colleagues and politicians accused her of racism and hate speech, and as an answer she founded the Swedish branch of the Danish Free Press Society to fight self-censorship of Swedes. "Sweden does not have Freedom of Press anymore. But not because government took it away, it is because the journalists themselves have abandoned it", she said. "Swedish journalists have forgot what their main mission – to scrutinise the powers. Instead they try to raise the people to think correctly. This has been going on for 15-20 years and was the main reason I left the mainstream-media. ... I was then denounced by almost all of my former colleagues, that spread the rumour that I had gone mad."

The rating agency Freedom House, while rating Sweden very high in all categories, supported her claims in its 2013 assessment of this issue: "Most of the mainstream media view criticism of immigration and Islam as a form of hate speech. In December, the tabloid Aftonbladet launched a campaign against nationalist blogs in order to test the limits of the hate speech law. It also directly called for a government intervention to shut down a number of the right-wing blogs."

A UNHCR 2015 report over the press coverage of the migrant crisis confirms that in Sweden "Overall, the [media] coverage took a positive view of refugees and the contributions that they could make to Swedish society" "most political sources featured in coverage did not discuss refugee issues in a negative way."

Tino Sanandaji wrote in 2018 an article about the dangers of the increasing taboo of talking about immigration in negative terms, commenting that "Exposing negative statistics about immigration sparked angry accusations of bigotry. Establishment voices shied away from the topic for fear of being accused as racist. Opposition to immigration became off-limits within all establishment parties".

A 2020 study by Lund University discusses the impact of fear of hate and threats on journalists' work and the resulting self-censorship. The study revealed that many journalists felt constrained in their reporting due to fear of retaliation from various groups and individuals. The findings emphasized the need to protect press freedom and create safe working environments where journalists can operate without fear of threats and harassment. The findings in the study suggested that if the journalist is young, female, and of foreign origin, the risk increased. Furthermore, if the report covered a sensitive topic such as ethnicity, immigration, or gender equality, the risk was further heightened.

== See also ==
- Hate speech in Sweden
- Internet censorship and surveillance in Sweden
