= Roger Nordin =

Swedish radio presenter and journalist (born 1977)

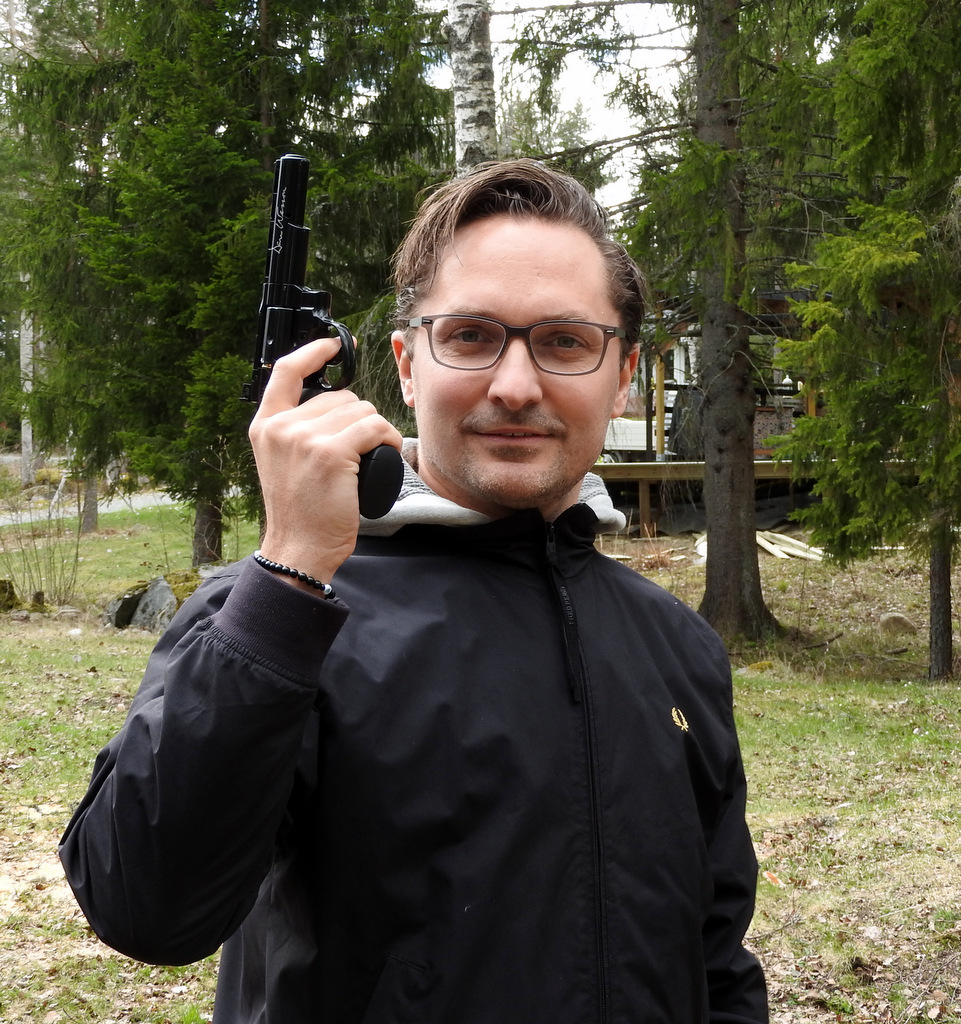
- Nordin in 2016
- Born: Nils Roger Nordin; 24 April 1977 (age 49); Gävle, Sweden
- Occupations: Radio presenter; journalist
- Years active: 1994–present

Nils Roger Nordin (born 24 April 1977) is a Swedish radio presenter and journalist. He has presented several radio shows including Rix Topp 6 and RIX MorronZoo.

== Early life ==
Nils Roger Nordin was born on 24 April 1977 in Gävle.

== Career ==
Nordin started his career in radio at the age of thirteen in 1991 for Gävle local radio. At the age of seventeen in 1994, he started working as a radio presenter for the radio station RIX 105 Gävle. In late-1994 and early-1995 he started presenting the national broadcasts for Radio Rix. When MTG bought the rights for Rix, he moved to Stockholm to present the daily hit-list Rix Topp 6. In August 2000, Nordin started presenting RIX MorronZoo, along with Titti Schultz and Gert Fylking. He presented the show until 2010. He continued to present daily on the station until 2013 when he left to start working for the radio station NRJ.

Rix FM's morning show had more listeners than Sveriges Radio's morning show. Nordin became "Radio Personality of the Year" at the Radiogala in 2004, and RIX MorronZoo won the viewers' prize Guldhornet at the same gala three years in a row.

Nordin presented the show "Sveriges smartaste barn", which was broadcast on TV3 in 2009. In January 2014, Nordin, along with Titti Schultz and Ola Lustig, started presenting "Vakna med NRJ" on the radio station NRJ.

He returned to present RIX MorronZoo with Laila Bagge at the beginning of 2017.

== Personal life ==
Nordin is openly gay, and he revealed it during a live radio broadcast in 2005. He won the award of Homo of the Year by QX Magazine's readers at the annual Gaygalan Awards in 2006.
