= Ola Lustig =

Swedish radio presenter (born 1978)

Ola Anders Lustig (born 7 March 1978 in Norrtälje) is a Swedish radio presenter. He is best known as the presenter of the Rix FM morning show Rix MorgonZoo. He has presented Vakna med NRJ since 2013 along with Titti Schultz and Roger Nordin. In 2011 he made it into the Big Brother house by renting a crane and took his way into the house and interviewed the housemates.
