= Hur många kramar finns det i världen? =

- Hur många kramar finns det i världen?
- Directed by: Lena Koppel
- Written by: Santiago Gil; Lena Koppel
- Produced by: Peter Kropenin; Peter Possne
- Starring: Ellinore Holmer; Maja Karlsson; Claes Malmberg; Mats Melin; Per Morberg; Cornelia Ravenal; Vanna Rosenberg; Theresia Widarsson; Bosse Östlin
- Cinematography: Olof Johnson
- Edited by: Mattias Morheden
- Music by: Adam Nordén
- Distributed by: AB Svensk Filmindustri
- Release date: August 16, 2013 (Sweden)
- Running time: 95 min
- Country: Sweden
- Language: Swedish
- Budget: 20,000,000 Swedish kronor

Hur många kramar finns det i världen? (English: How many hugs are there in the world?) is a 2013 Swedish comedy-drama film starring Claes Malmberg, Per Morberg, Vanna Rosenberg and Glada Hudik-teatern.

== Plot ==
Max (Per Morberg) is a successful New York-based advertisement photographer, but betrayal from his parents and girlfriend has made him bitter, mean and lonely. Just as he's about to commit suicide his phone rings. It is Peter (Claes Malmberg), Max's old childhood friend whom he hasn't spoken to in over 30 years. He wants Max to come to Sweden and help him film a YouTube-video of his daughter's intellectually disabled friends. Max accepts the offer and goes to Sweden, and from the start it looks like a pretty easy task, but it becomes more complicated than Max could ever imagine.

== Cast ==
- Per Morberg as Max
- Claes Malmberg as Peter
- Vanna Rosenberg as Hanna
- Mats Melin as Kjell-Åke
- Bosse Östlin as Ebbe
- Ellinore Holmer as Katarina
- Theresia Widarsson as Filippa
- Maja Karlsson as Kristina
- Figge Norling as Jocke
- Nisti Stêrk as a doctor
- Cornelia Ravenal as Dolores
- Scott Ackerman as Nicholas
- Max Altin as a model

== Production ==
This movie was produced by Peter Kropenin and Peter Possne, directed by Lena Koppel and written by Santiago Gil and Lena Koppel.

It was filmed in Hudiksvall and in New York during the fall of 2012.

== Critical response ==
This movie received mostly negative reviews. The Göteborgs-Posten said the "cheesy background story that includes Per Morberg, Vanja Rosenberg and Claes Malmberg" was "on the verge of a total failure". The Svenska Dagbladet said the structure of the movie "resembles a square Swedish 1940s movie".
