= Rapport till himlen =

- Written by: Alexandra Kumlin; Ulf Malmros
- Directed by: Ulf Malmros
- Starring: see below
- Theme music composer: Vasa
- Country of origin: Sweden
- Original language: Swedish
- No. of episodes: 4

Production
- Producer: Kaśka Krosny
- Cinematography: Mats Olofsson
- Editor: Ulf Malmros
- Running time: 60 min. (per episode)

Original release
- Network: SVT
- Release: 20 September – 11 October 1994

Rapport till himlen (lit. "Report to heaven") is a 1994 Swedish mini series directed by Ulf Malmros and starring Johan Widerberg and Lina Englund.

== Plot summary ==
It's summer and Victor's friends are off to travel by InterRail while Victor stays home working as an announcer for Bingo numbers. After a swimming accident where his heart stops for 12 minutes he is able to see dead people. He meets Anna, a girl who was murdered, and they set out to reveal who killed her. The name of the murderer must be entered into Anna's report to heaven.

== Cast ==
- Johan Widerberg as Victor
- Lina Englund as Anna
- Stellan Skarsgård as Gary
- Kjell Bergqvist as Allan (The priest)
- Vanna Rosenberg as Sonja

and

- Liv Alsterlund as Clara
- Malou Bergman as My
- Thorsten Flinck as Pedro
- Oscar Franzén as Victor's Friend #2
- Gert Fylking as Mr. Splendid
- Per Graffman as Coroner
- Lars Green as Biker Angel
- Robert Gustafsson as The Guarding Cop
- Lena T. Hansson as Doctor
- Musse Hasselvall as Victor's Friend #1
- Thomas Hellberg as Chief Superintendent
- P.G. Hylén as The Sweaty Man
- Elin Klinga as Lisa
- Mattias Knave as The Heaven Man
- Marika Lagercrantz as Victor's Mother
- Yvonne Lombard as Mrs. Landberg, Anna's Grandmother
- Anneli Martini as The Feminist
- Simon Norrthon as Jerry
- Ivan Öhlin as Mark
- Kalle Westerdahl as Niklas
