= Vanna Rosenberg =

Swedish actress and singer

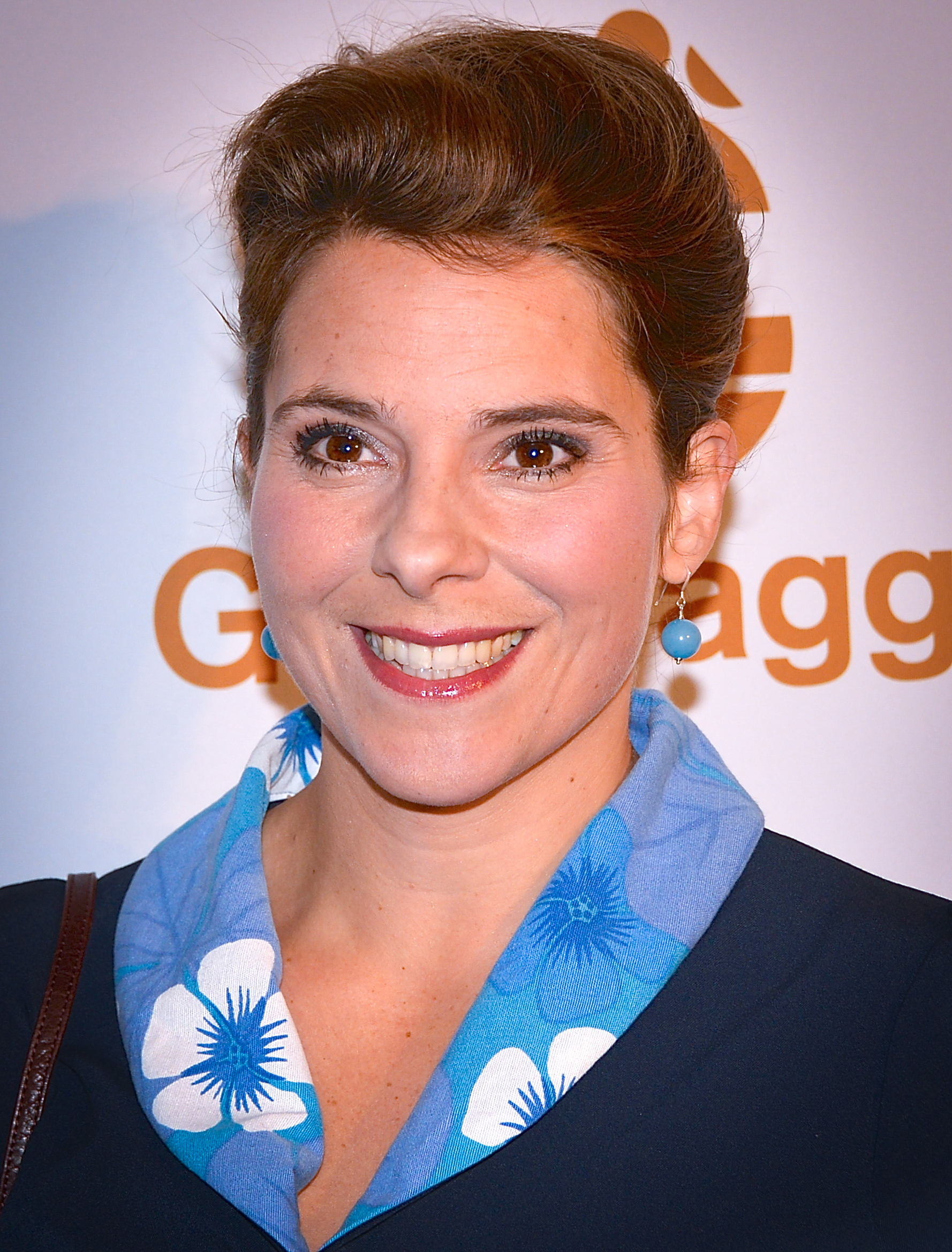
- Rosenberg in 2013.
- Born: Vanna Felicia Rosenberg; 3 April 1973 (age 53); Farsta, Sweden
- Occupations: Actress, singer
- Years active: 1991–present
- Parent: Göran Rosenberg (father)

Vanna Felicia Rosenberg Synnerholm (born 3 April 1973 in Farsta, Stockholm Municipality) is a Swedish singer and actress. She is married to the film producer Ulf Synnerholm.

== Career ==
Rosenberg started doing plays as a kindergarten-child; her mother, Annika Isaksson, was a drama-pedagogist and the whole kindergarten acted in the TV program Du måste förstå att jag älskar Fantomen, that aired over Christmas 1981–1982.

As a singer, Rosenberg has been a member of the dance-music group Adastra.

From 1997 to 2001 Rosenberg studied at the Swedish National Academy of Mime and Acting. In 2001 she received a Guldmasken for her appearance in the farce Maken till fruar.

In 2009 and 2010, Rosenberg and her father, Göran Rosenberg, competed in the TV program På spåret.

== Selected filmography ==
- 1991 – Agnes Cecilia – en sällsam historia
- 1994 – Rapport till himlen (TV)
- 1995 – En på miljonen
- 1996 – Att stjäla en tjuv
- 1996 – Silvermannen (TV)
- 1996 – Percy tårar (TV)
- 1997 – Adam & Eva
- 1999 – Dödlig drift
- 2001 – Björnes magasin (TV program)
- 2003 – Kvarteret Skatan (TV)
- 2003/2004 – Jullovsmorgon från TV-skeppet (TV program (Jullovsmorgon), together with Peter Harryson)
- 2004 – Allt och lite till (TV)
- 2004 – Mongolpiparen
- 2006 – Tjocktjuven
- 2007 – En riktig jul (TV ("Julkalendern"))
- 2010 – Bröderna Karlsson
- 2010 – Hotell Gyllene Knorren (TV ("Julkalendern"))
- 2011 – Hur många lingon finns det i världen?
- 2012 – Kvarteret Skatan reser till Laholm
- 2013 – Hur många kramar finns det i världen?
- 2023 – Masked Singer Sverige (season 3(TV))
