= Silvermannen =

- Written by: Ulf Malmros; Vasa
- Directed by: Ulf Malmros
- Starring: see below
- Theme music composer: Vasa
- Country of origin: Sweden
- Original language: Swedish
- No. of episodes: 3

Production
- Producer: Ann-Mari Jartelius
- Cinematography: Mats Olofsson
- Editor: Ulf Malmros
- Running time: 55 min. per episode (168 in total)

Original release
- Network: SVT
- Release: 2 September – 16 September 1996

Silvermannen (lit. "The Silver Man") is a 1996 Swedish mini series in 3 episodes directed by Ulf Malmros and starring Kjell Bergqvist.

== Plot summary ==
A man, missing since 5 years, turns up in the town Bläcksjön with no memory of who he is. He is unable to identify with his former life and instead becomes obsessed with mediating in a town feud during a nationwide energy crisis.

== Cast ==
- Kjell Bergqvist as Silvermannen
- Gert Fylking as Roy
- Per Graffman as Holmgren
- Sara Key as Eva
- Carl Kjellgren as Conny
- Camilla Lundén as Kajsa
- Anneli Martini as Henrietta
- Jacob Nordenson
- Margareta Pettersson
- Jacqueline Ramel as Mona
- Thomas Ravelli as himself
- Vanna Rosenberg as Kristina
- Göran Thorell as Maans
- Anna Westerberg
