= Surfing the Web of Hate =

"Surfing the Web of Hate" (original title "Män som näthatar kvinnor"; literally "Men who Internet-hate women") is a Swedish documentary by Nicke Nordmark and Hasse Johansson that was broadcast as an episode of Uppdrag granskning on Sveriges Television on 6 March 2013. The program focuses on online harassment and threats against women in Sweden.

One of the women is Julia, who made a post on Hennes Mauritz's Facebook page where she objected to the company having introduced a clothing line featuring Tupac Shakur, because Shakur had been convicted of sexual assault. The post received about 1800 responses which mostly centred on Julia and included threats of rape, stoning, shooting and drowning. Her full address was also posted.

The program featured 12 female journalists who read aloud harassment and threats they had received in online commentary or in emails. The journalists included Åsa Linderborg, Maria Sveland, Titti Schultz and Ann-Charlotte Marteus.

A few of the men who had sent harassing and violent messages were interviewed. They were mostly young, and when asked about their comments, tended to backtrack and say it wasn't meant literally and not meant to cause harm.

The documentary makers wrote in a follow-up article that they had received criticism for mainly including left-wing feminist women and not addressing the problem of conservative women being objects of hate. The reporters said many of the women did not have any known political leanings and of those who had, at least one, Anna Hedemo, could not be considered a left-leaning feminist.
