= Lina Englund =

Swedish actress and musician

- Born: Lina Maria Englund; 14 May 1975 (age 50); Spånga, Stockholm, Sweden
- Occupation: actress

Lina Maria Englund (born 14 May 1975 in Spånga) is a Swedish actress and musician.

Englund went to the Adolf Fredrik's Music School in Stockholm for middle and high school.

When she was 12, she went with a friend to an audition for the movie Miraklet i Valby and got the female lead. At 15, she played Camilla in the television series Storstad for a year and a half. When the show ended, she enrolled in the 2-year aesthetic-practical course at the Södra Latins gymnasium in Stockholm. While studying there, she participated in the Canadian young people's TV series Northwood, where she played the au pair Kristina. She also had the female lead in Ulf Malmros' TV series Rapport till himlen.

For her role in the 1996 movie Vinterviken, she was nominated for a Guldbagge Award as Best Actress in a leading role. She attended the Swedish National Academy of Mime and Acting from 1995 to 1999 and after graduation, joined the Stockholm City Theatre and Teater Galeasen. Among other productions, she has appeared in Chekhov's Three Sisters and Uncle Vanya, and Lars Norén's Krig (War).

In the summer of 2001 she filmed Outside Your Door in Lycksele. At the premiere the following year, Englund received good reviews, "very good" and "convincing."

Together with David Shutrick and Johan Lindstrom, she formed the group Selfish, which in 1998 released the disc Wanting You Would Be. The album received a mixed reception, but as a singer the critics pronounced Englund "very talented" and "very convincing". The group released only the one recording, but Englund has continued with music; among other things, she has written music for the National Swedish Touring Theatre's production of Jean Genet's The Maids. She recorded a new album with David Shutrick in 2006, but it was not released in 2007. She also recorded material with Martin Thomasson of Rockmonster and co-wrote songs with Eric Erlandson of Hole.

In fall 2006, Englund participated in the filming of the TV series Bror och syster, which was broadcast in spring 2007. In 2008, she had a recurring role in the TV series based on the comic strip Rocky.

== Filmography (selection) ==
- 1989 - Miraklet i Valby
- 1990 - Storstad (TV)
- 1994 - Rapport till himlen (TV)
- 1996 - Vinterviken
- 1996 - När Finbar försvann
- 1999 - Dödlig drift
- 2000 - Syskonsalt (TV)
- 2002 - Outside Your Door
- 2002 - Lilla körsbärsträdgården (Stockholm City Theatre)
- 2003 - Popcorn (TV)
- 2003 - Swedenhielms
- 2004 - Om Stig Petrés hemlighet (TV)
- 2005 - Storm
- 2006 - Stilla Natt
- 2007 - Bror och syster (TV)
- 2007 - Arn – The Knight Templar
- 2025 – The Von Fersens
