= The Painter (1982 film) =

1982 film

- Directed by: Göran du Rées; Christina Olofson
- Written by: Göran du Rées
- Produced by: Göran du Rées
- Starring: Hans Mosesson; Kent Andersson
- Cinematography: Göran du Rées
- Release date: 19 February 1982
- Running time: 89 minutes
- Country: Sweden
- Language: Swedish

The Painter (Swedish: Målaren) is a 1982 Swedish film directed by Göran du Rées and Christina Olofson. It was entered into the 13th Moscow International Film Festival.

== Cast ==
- Hans Mosesson as Stig Dahlman
- Kent Andersson as Eskil
- Anneli Martini as Mona
- Tomas Forssell as Factory worker
- Weiron Holmberg as Sune
- Hans Johansson as 'Tjocken'
- Mats Johansson as Factory worker
- Stellan Johansson as Bertil
- Jussi Larnö as 'Finnen'
- Sten Ljunggren as Supervisor
- Ingmar Nilsson as Factory worker
- Hans Wiktorsson as Åke
