= Anna Lindholm =

Swedish actress

Anna Lindholm (born 2 June 1965 in Malmö) is a Swedish actress.

== Filmography ==
- 2006 – Frostbiten
- 2003 - Ramona
- 2001 – Spökafton
- 1999 – En häxa i familjen
- 1998 – Beck – Monstret
- 1998 – S:t Mikael
- 1996 – Svensson, Svensson
- 1995 - Arne Anka - En afton på Zekes (Theatre)
- 1995 – Tag ditt liv
- 1994 – Den vite riddaren
- 1993 – Drömmen om Rita
- 1992 – Första Kärleken
