= The Miracle in Valby =

1989 film by Åke Sandgren

- Theatrical poster
- Miraklet i Valby
- Directed by: Åke Sandgren
- Written by: Stig Larsson; Åke Sandgren
- Produced by: Bo Christensen
- Starring: Jakob Katz; Troels Asmussen; Lina Englund; Amalie Ihle Alstrup
- Cinematography: Dan Laustsen
- Edited by: Darek Hodor
- Music by: Wlodek Gulgowski; Roxette
- Production company: Nordisk Film
- Distributed by: Pathé-Nordisk (Denmark)
- Release dates: 6 October 1989 (Denmark); 6 October 1989 (Sweden)
- Running time: 85 minutes
- Countries: Denmark; Sweden
- Languages: Danish; Swedish

The Miracle in Valby (Swedish: Miraklet i Valby) is a 1989 Danish-Swedish drama film written and directed by Åke Sandgren, and starring Jakob Katz, Troels Asmussen, Lina Englund, and Amalie Ihle Alstrup. The film was produced by Nordisk Film, won the awards for Best Film, Best Director and Best Screenplay at the Guldbagge Award.

== Plot ==
The story follows a teenage radio amateur who discovers a frequency that can transport him back in time.

== Cast ==
- Jakob Katz as Sven
- Troels Asmussen as Bo
- Lina Englund as Petra
- Amalie Ihle Alstrup as Hanna
- Gregers Reimann as the boy from the middle ages
- Jens Okking as Bo's Father
- Ingvar Hirdwall as Petra's Father
- Karen-Lise Mynster as Sven's Mother
- Peter Hesse Overgaard as the vicar
- Mona Seilitz as Petra's Mother
