= Anneli Martini =

Swedish actress

- Born: Anneli Margareta Christensen; 21 December 1948 (age 77); Malmö, Sweden
- Occupation: Actress
- Years active: 1980–present

Anneli Margareta Martini (née Christensen; born 21 December 1948) is a Swedish actress. Since 1977, she has appeared in more than thirty films over four decades.

== Selected filmography ==
Film
Year	Title	Role	Notes
2018	Aniara	the Astronomer	Roberta Twelander
2003	Hannah med H		
1995	A Life for the Taking		
1982	The Painter		

TV
Year	Title	Role	Notes
2010	Solsidan	Eva	
1996	Silvermannen		
1994	Rapport till himlen		
