= Tjenare kungen =

- Swedish cover.
- Directed by: Ulf Malmros
- Written by: Anna Fredriksson, Ulf Malmros
- Produced by: Lena Rehnberg
- Starring: Josefin Neldén; Cecilia Wallin; Malin Larsson
- Music by: Jimmy Lagnefors
- Distributed by: Sandrew Metronome, Film i Väst, Kanal 5
- Release date: 16 September 2005 (Sweden)
- Running time: 94 minutes
- Country: Sweden
- Language: Swedish

Tjenare kungen (international title: God Save the King - the title would more readily translate as a deliberately chummy "Yo, King!" or " 'Ullo the King!"") is a Swedish drama film which was released to cinemas in Sweden on 16 September 2005.

== Plot ==
The film is set in 1984. 19-year old Abra lives in the small town of Billingsfors and is the only punk rocker there. When synth band Happy Gigolos leaves town after a failed gig she tags along to Gothenburg and decides to start a punk band, God Save the King, together with Millan. Their dream is to release a single by Christmas.

== Cast ==
- Josefin Neldén as Abra
- Cecilia Wallin as Millan
- Joel Kinnaman as Dickan
- Malin Larsson as Isa
- Johanna Strömberg as Gloria
- Kjell Bergqvist as factory manager
- Fyr Thorwald as Bar-Jonny at Errols
- Morgan Alling as Stefan
- Erica Carlson as Abra's sister
- Jessica Persson as "Karin", Dickan's sister
- Ralph Carlsson as Leif
- Anders Lönnbro
- Daniel Gustavsson
- Markus Holmberg as Piffen

== See also ==
- Ebba Grön
