= A Brief Stop on the Road from Auschwitz =

Book by Göran Rosenberg

- First edition
- Author: Göran Rosenberg
- Original title: Ett kort uppehåll på vägen från Auschwitz
- Language: Swedish
- Published: 2012
- Publisher: Albert Bonniers Förlag
- Publication place: Sweden
- Awards: August Prize of 2012

A Brief Stop on the Road from Auschwitz (Swedish: Ett kort uppehåll på vägen från Auschwitz) is a 2012 book by Swedish author Göran Rosenberg, variously described as a novel and a non-fiction narrative book.

As of 2014, the book has been translated into nine languages and sold more than 200,000 copies.

It won the August Prize in 2012 and the Prix du Meilleur Livre Étranger in 2014.

== Synopsis ==
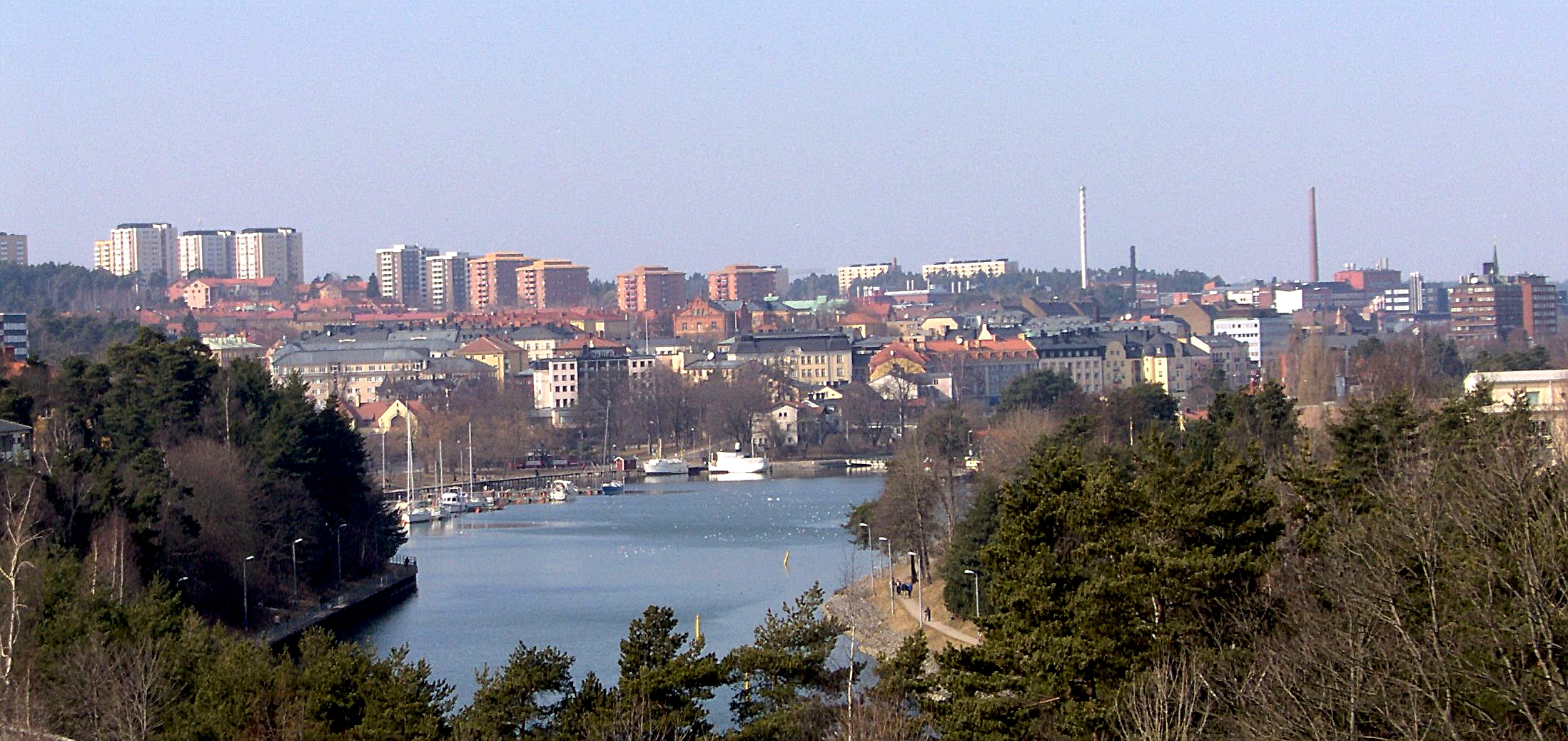
Södertälje

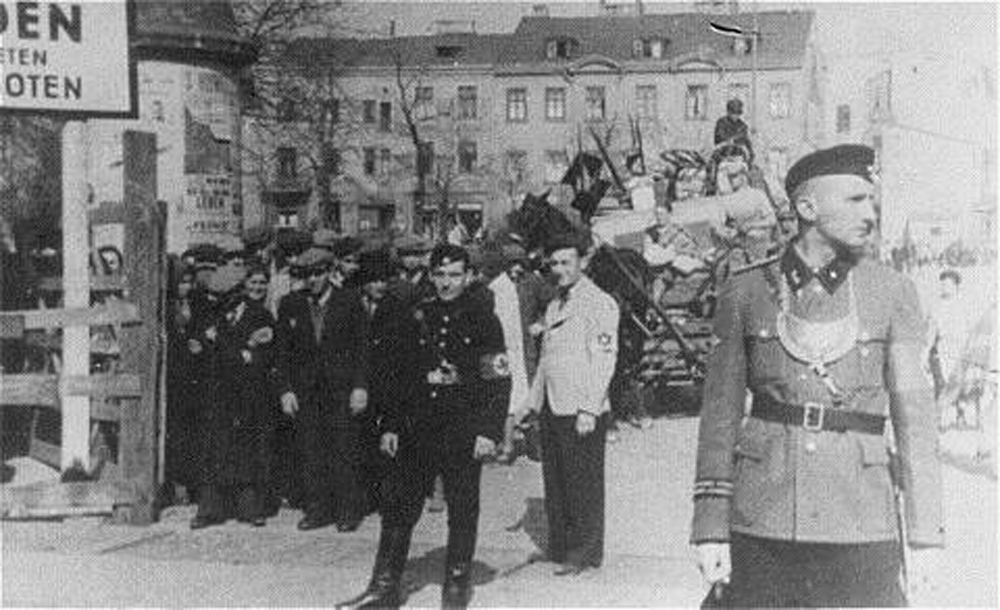
Łódź Ghetto

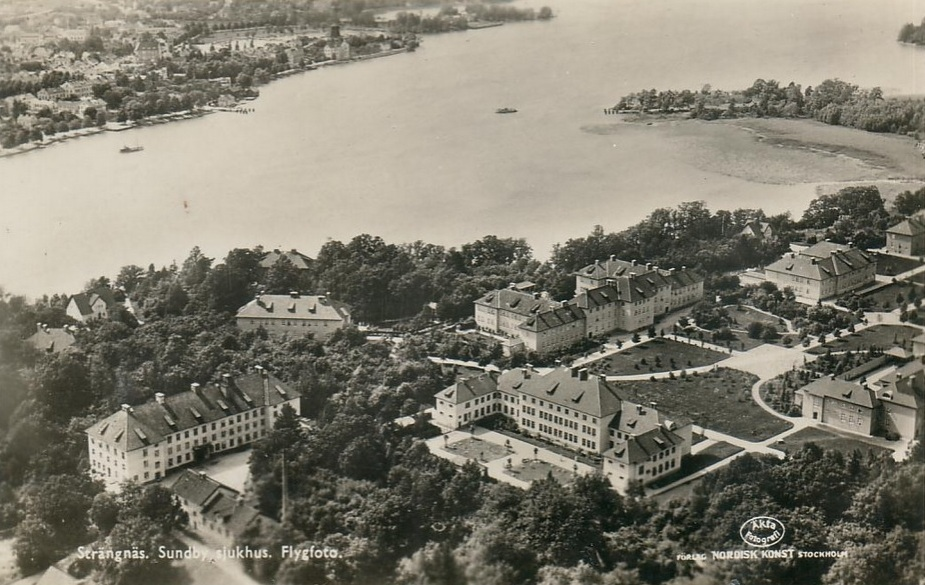
Sundby hospital in Strängnäs, Södermanland

The book starts with a chapter called "The Place" in which, on 2 August 1947, a 24-year-old man arrives via train at the industrial town of Södertälje. He starts working at a lorry factory. Soon after a woman which the author refers to as my future mother joins the man. Originally from Łódź, Poland, the man and woman had started a relationship in the Łódź Ghetto, then been separated in the Auschwitz-Birkenau concentration camp in 1944 and reunited in Alingsås before moving to Södertälje. They get an apartment and their first child is born; the latter is the author, who refers to himself as "the child". They name him Göran, the most common name in Sweden, and not after his Jewish grandfather, Gershon, and they start speaking to each other in Swedish perhaps to make him fit into the place. The chapter further focuses on "The Child"s experience in Södermanland, which is mostly positive. He learns to downplay his foreign background, and at one point, he writes with regard to one of his teachers, "I never let Mr. Winqvist find out that I knew a few words of Yiddish".

The next chapters, called "The Wall", "The Carousel" and "The Road", recount the experience the man had in Auschwitz, as imagined by the author, informed by the historical record, in addition to the man's prior life in Poland, and general stories from Poland and Sweden during World War II. It ends with the man, now named David Rosenberg, arriving in Malmö on 18 July 1945. The chapter "The Stop" describes David Rosenberg's early years in Sweden, as well the story of his wife, Hala Staw, during the war and afterwards in Poland. She arrives in Sweden in August 1946.

David travels to Łódź in 1958 and stays for three weeks, but finds the city depressing. He unsuccessfully seeks the graves of his father and other family members.

In 1956, David applies to Germany for economic compensation and is examined by Herbert Lindenbaum, a doctor representing Germany. The doctor partly doubts the veracity of David's claim and partly claims he is exaggerating his psychological problems. He describes Rosenberg as suffering from Rentenneurose [pension neurosis], a psychological sickness motivated by the wish for insurance benefits and the application is declined. He makes a new application and in the following years several doctors, many saying that his ability to work is reduced by 60% due to psychological illness that can be related to the wartime experiences. A new doctor representing Germany, Herbert Lebram, concludes that his ability to work has been permanently reduced by 20%. On this basis, the application was again declined, as compensations required a minimum 25% reduction of working ability. The book recounts these important details exemplifying how in the 1950s postwar Germany further victimised, albeit not so to the same extent, Jewish Europeans it had already so wronged during the 1940s.

Meanwhile, the health of David Rosenberg has deteriorated. He is on sick leave from his work due to depression from December 1959.

In April 1960, he becomes a patient at Sundby hospital in Strängnäs where he is treated for depression. He is given electroshock and medications but this is recounted briefly in the book rather than portrayed. On 22 July 1960, he commits suicide by drowning in a nearby lake. Again, this is not elaborated in the text, but mentioned in an objective manner, and the reader is left to fill in the emotion attached to this fact.

In a short afterword, Göran Rosenberg tells about his work writing the book. Throughout the book, the reader's attention is also drawn to the process of writing and the research and investigation behind that process. The book itself draws attention to the limits of knowledge about the past, as well as the importance of attempting to understand what happened. Thus it contributes to a sense of there being an ongoing process of coming to terms - each generation must find and write its Holocaust narratives. There is not one complete narrative of the Holocaust but a growing set of fragments that improve our grasp of what occurred during this most shameful era of European history and its immediate aftermath.

=== Background, analysis and reviews ===
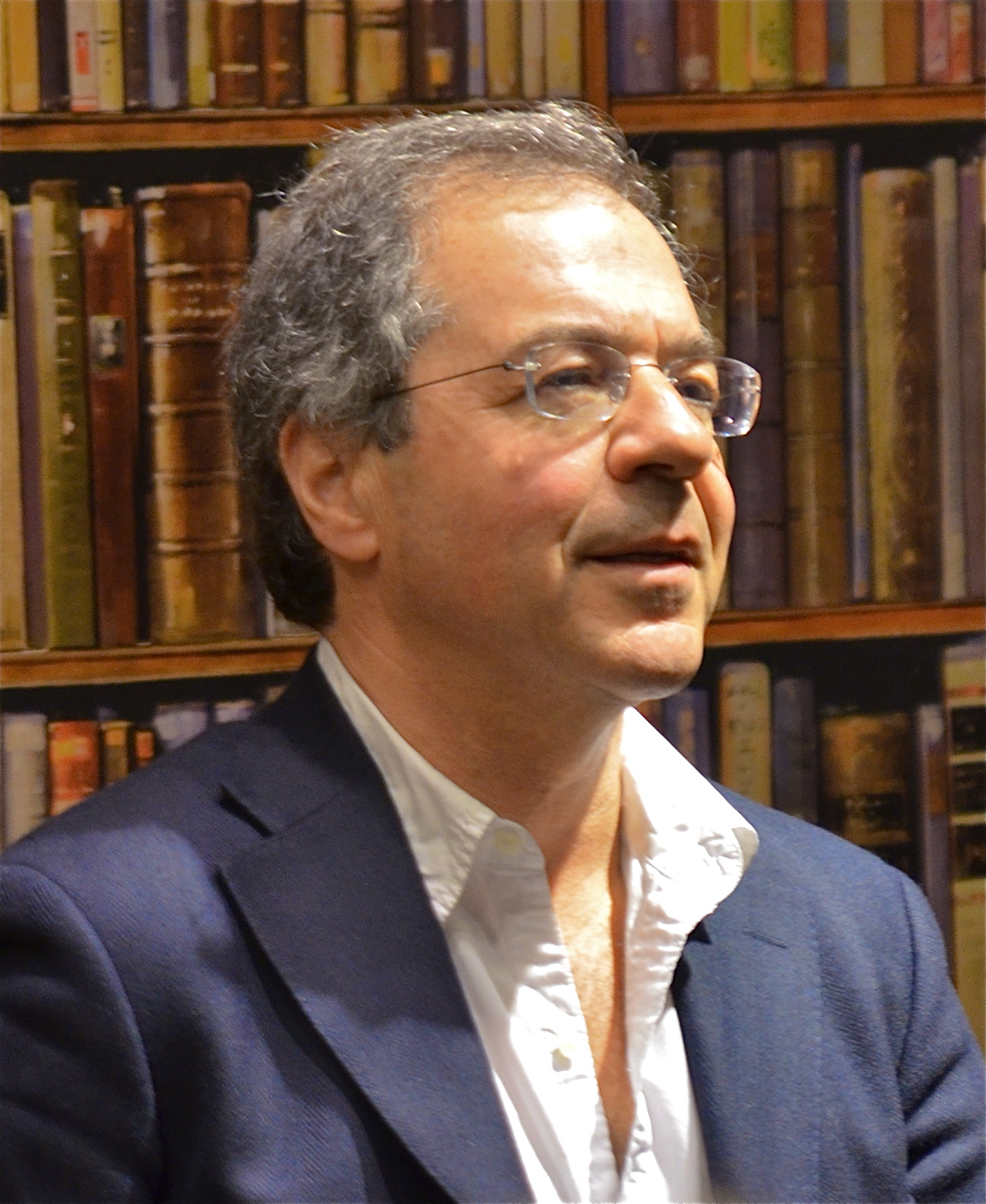
The author Göran Rosenberg

While the book in Sweden was published as a documentary novel, it has in other countries been described as a non-fiction memoir. The book is based on the author's memories and research, as well as the memories of his mother Hala Rosenberg, sister Lillian Rosenberg-Roth and his cousins. Family members also provided documentation. Letters exchanged between the author's parents while Hala was in Poland and David in Sweden are quoted in the book as important background material, as are other family letters, including from Göran as a child. A few family photos are included, including one of Göran as a toddler with both his parents in front of an apartment building which is used on the cover of one edition. The book also makes use of medical records. In addition, the author uses Swedish and foreign public sources, like history books and old newspapers. As part of preparation for writing the book, Rosenberg traveled to Germany and Poland.

The story of his parents is told through the voice of the author, who refers to himself as "The Child". Reviewers have described the book as just as much about the author Göran Rosenberg as about his father David Some reviewers also draw parallels between the scepticism and xenophobia that David Rosenberg experienced in postwar Europe with the experience of refugees in contemporary Sweden and Europe.

The book received many positive reviews. Writing in the Financial Times Philippe Sands describes the book as "a towering and wondrous work about memory and experience, exquisitely crafted, beautifully written, humane, generous, devastating, yet somehow also hopeful". Hester Vaizey in The Independent found the story

utterly unforgettable, breathing life into the painful experiences of a couple who, like many other displaced Jews in Europe at the end of World War Two, were intent on making a success of survival after the world had turned its back on them. It is a chilling reminder of how the consequences of war long outlived the ceasefire.

In a more critical review, Thomas Harding in New Statesman sees the book as a non-fiction narrative and finds that it relies too much on speculation. He writes that "Rosenberg's assertion of authorial integrity at the beginning of the book is undermined throughout. He does speculate; and then goes further, reproducing a novelist's description of life in a cattle cart, thus stepping into the world of fiction". Readers are invited by this narrative technique to consider how we reach an accurate depiction of past times and situations that are as vast and horrific as the Holocaust.
