= Maria Sveland =

Author and journalist

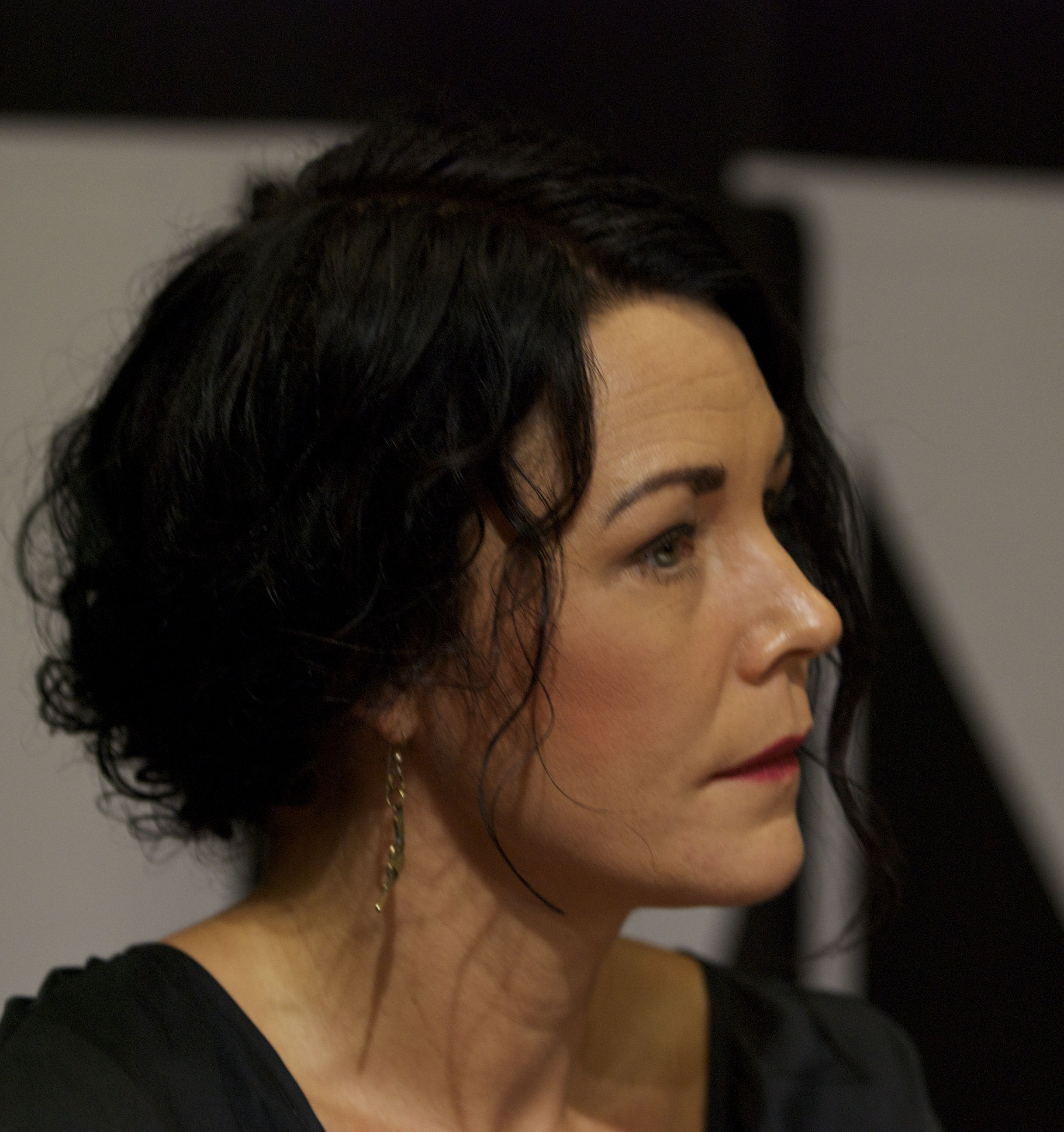
Maria Sveland at the Gothenburg Book Fair in 2011.

Maria Sveland (born 26 November 1974) is an author and journalist from Sweden, best known for the 2007 book Bitterfittan (a made up Swedish compound noun which could be translated as either Bittercunt or The Bitter Cunt or less literally Bitterbitch or The Bitter Bitch). Bitterfittan is, according to Sveland, not an autobiography but rather a work inspired by her own experiences. The book criticises the institutionalised nuclear family from a radical feminist perspective, pointing out issues such as women's unpaid domestic labour, sexual violence, and the disproportional male/female use of parental leave.

Sveland contributed to the 2013 Swedish documentary Surfing the Web of Hate.

Bitterfan 2 was released in 2017.

== Works ==
- Tucker, Maria Sveland; translated by Katarina E. (2011). Bitter Bitch. London: Constable & Robinson. ISBN 9781849013215.
