= Outside Your Door =

Swedish cover.

Outside Your Door (Swedish: Utanför din dörr) is a Swedish independent film directed by Martin Söder, which tells the story of a young man living with Tourette syndrome without knowing it. It was released in 2002 by the production company Desperado, and won the 2003 CineStar-Youth Film Prize.

== Cast ==
- Lina Englund as Sanna
- Eric Donell as André
- Björn Gustafson
- Lennart Jähkel
- Lennart Hjulström
- Anna Granquist as Sara
- Tomas Magnusson as Rolle
- Gerthi Kulle as André's mother
- Ann Petrén as Sanna's mother
- Henrik Hjelt as Jeppe
