= A Life for the Taking =

1995 film

- Directed by: Göran du Rées
- Written by: Per Gunnar Evander; Göran du Rées
- Produced by: Göran du Rées
- Starring: Hans Mosesson
- Cinematography: Göran du Rées
- Release date: 10 February 1995
- Running time: 82 minutes
- Country: Sweden
- Language: Swedish

A Life for the Taking (Swedish: Tag ditt liv) is a 1995 Swedish drama film directed by Göran du Rées. It was entered into the 19th Moscow International Film Festival.

== Cast ==
- Hans Mosesson as Stig F. Dahlman
- Björn Granath as Björn Granath
- Benny Granberg as Benny
- Niklas Hald as Clark
- Barbro Kollberg as Signe Dahlman
- Jussi Larnö as Ensio
- Anna Lindholm as Eva
- Anneli Martini as Måna
- Bibi Nordin as Vera Lundberg
- Terri-Lynne Sandberg as Birgitta
