= Första Kärleken =

- Genre: Drama
- Created by: Leif Magnusson
- Starring: Linus Åberg; Alexandra Royal; Johan Lilja; Christopher Luschan
- Music by: Jacob Groth
- Country of origin: Sweden
- Original language: Swedish
- No. of episodes: 6

Production
- Running time: 25 minutes
- Production companies: SVT; Nordisk Film

Original release
- Network: SVT1
- Release: April 7 – May 12, 1992

Första Kärleken is a 1992 Swedish television miniseries created by Leif Magnusson. Starring Linus Åberg, Alexandra Royal and Christopher Luschan. It's loosely based on Hjärtans Fröjd, a novel by Per Nilsson, about a boy who fell in love with a girl.

== Plot ==
Daniel Andersson looks forward to yet another exciting summer together with his friend Anders, but this year he'll be spending most of his time with someone else. Anna, who is deaf, has moved in with her parents in the cottage next door. One day, while Daniel is swimming in a nearby lake, Anna shows up unexpectedly, and the two hit it off immediately. Before long, their friendship develops into a romance. Little do they know, local bad boy Jesper has been spying on them swimming, and Anna has caught his eye. When Jesper tries to move in on Anna, trouble ensues.

== Cast ==
=== Main ===
- Linus Åberg as Daniel
- Alexandra Royal as Anna
- Johan Lilja as Anders
- Christopher Luschan as Jesper
- Jimmy Sandin as Patrik
- Hans Mosesson as Daniel's Father
- Ewa Carlsson as Daniel's Mother

=== Recurring ===
- Anders Ahlbom as Benny
- Barbro Kollberg as Clara
- Bergljót Arnadóttir as Ann-Britt
- Gustav Elander as Bengt
- Lars Green as Jesper's Father
- Anna Lindholm as Linda
- Nadia Saleh as Maria
- Pia Oscarsson as Lena
- Susanne Barklund as Jenny
- Nicke Wagemyr as Pelle
- Ulla Akselsson as Cashier
- Dan Johansson as Officer

== Episodes ==
No.	Title	Directed by	Written by	Original release date
1	"Möten"	Leif Magnusson	Leif Magnusson	April 7, 1992
Daniel Andersson and his family are taken by a taxi driver to their country house. Arriving there, Daniel finds his best friend Anders waiting for him. They go into the boat and swims on the lake. Meanwhile, a rich boy named Jesper was observing the lake and watch them. At night, Daniel is bored and his parents argue. Daniel leaves the house and sees a blonde girl. Next morning, Daniel is swimming in the lake and encounters the blonde girl. He tries to talk to her, but finds out that she's deaf and that her name is Anna. Next day, Daniel spots Anna swims and Anders chase her with the boat. In despair, Anna gets hurt.
2	"Spirande Förälskelse"	Leif Magnusson	Leif Magnusson	April 14, 1992
Daniel watches Anna doing makeup and apologizes. Daniel rents books about sign language and begins to learn about it. Daniel goes to Anna's house and communicates with her using sign language. Daniel continues to learn sign language and get closer to Anna, distancing himself from his best friend. Anders gets upset. Jesper was watching everything and takes advantage of the situation to befriend Anders.
3	"Rivalen"	Leif Magnusson	Leif Magnusson	April 21, 1992
Jesper arrives at Daniel's house on his moped with Anders. Jesper asks Daniel about the blonde girl and gets happy to know that he isn't her boyfriend. Jesper and Anders are preparing a party to celebrate Midsummer. Next day, Jesper invites Anna and Daniel too, at Anna's request. At night, Daniel and Anna run away from home and go to Jesper's party.
4	"Minne För Livet"	Leif Magnusson	Leif Magnusson	April 28, 1992
At Jesper's party, Daniel is humiliated by Anders and Jesper. Daniel goes to the bathroom and Jesper locks him up in order to spend more time with Anna. Hours later, Daniel is released when someone enters in the bathroom. Daniel fights with Jesper and Anna leaves the party. Daniel follows her and they swim in the lake. Back home, they're forbidden by Anna's mother to move on with their relationship because she thinks they swam naked. Later that day, Daniel gets bored and walks by the Anders' house, but sees Jesper there.
5	"Misshandlingen"	Leif Magnusson	Leif Magnusson	May 5, 1992
Anna goes shopping with her friend Maria, who is deaf too. Leaving the store, Anna meets Jesper and he offers a ride. Anna accepts. Jesper takes Anna to an abandoned place and tries to kiss her, but she refuses. Daniel is warned that his parents are getting divorced and that his mother will leave the country house soon. Next morning, Daniel wakes up and follows some clues that lead him to an abandoned shed. He enters and finds a birthday present made by Anna. Daniel celebrates his 14th birthday with his family and Anna. Anders watches his party and gets upset that he wasn't invited. Anders tells about it to Jesper, who plans a revenge. Daniel and Anna plan to talk later in the woods. Anna leaves the party and, a while later, Daniel leaves the party and goes to the forest, but is ambushed by Jesper and Anders. They tie Daniel to a tree and pull his trousers down. Jesper encourages Anders to similarly remove Daniel's underwear, but Anders refuses. Jesper blindfolds Daniel, then threatens him with a box of matches. Before he can use them, Jesper sees Anna in the forest and follows her. Jesper invites Anna to swim, but she refuses. Jesper gets angry, throws mud at her and tries to kill her, but is prevented by Anders. Anna and Anders run away. Enraged, Jesper returns to Daniel (who is still tied to the tree, blindfolded with his trousers at his ankles), wielding a small log like a club.
6	"Värre Än Väntat"	Leif Magnusson	Leif Magnusson	May 12, 1992
Daniel is still tied to a tree. Jesper returns and releases Daniel, blaming Anders about it. Daniel's mother goes away. Jesper tries to apologize with Daniel, but he would only forgive Jesper if he borrowed his moped. Jesper goes away and steals Clara's money. Jesper returns and agrees to borrow his moped to Daniel. The police is advised about the assault involving a moped. Daniel is driving Jesper's moped, but is chased by the police. Daniel suffers an accident and gets injured. He's later found by Anna and is taken to the hospital with Anders. The police talks to Jesper and he blames Daniel about the assault. Jesper is going away with his family, but is stopped by the police and interrogated. The police discover that Jesper was responsible for the assault and that Daniel is innocent. The police arrest Jesper. Later, Daniel and Anna are together in the dock and he asks what a certain sign means. Anna writes on his hand that the sign means "I love you". Anna leaves Daniel and goes away. Anders and Daniel go back to being friends.

== Release ==
The series was released on video cassette and is available in streaming.
