= Hans Mosesson =

Swedish actor and musician (1944–2023)

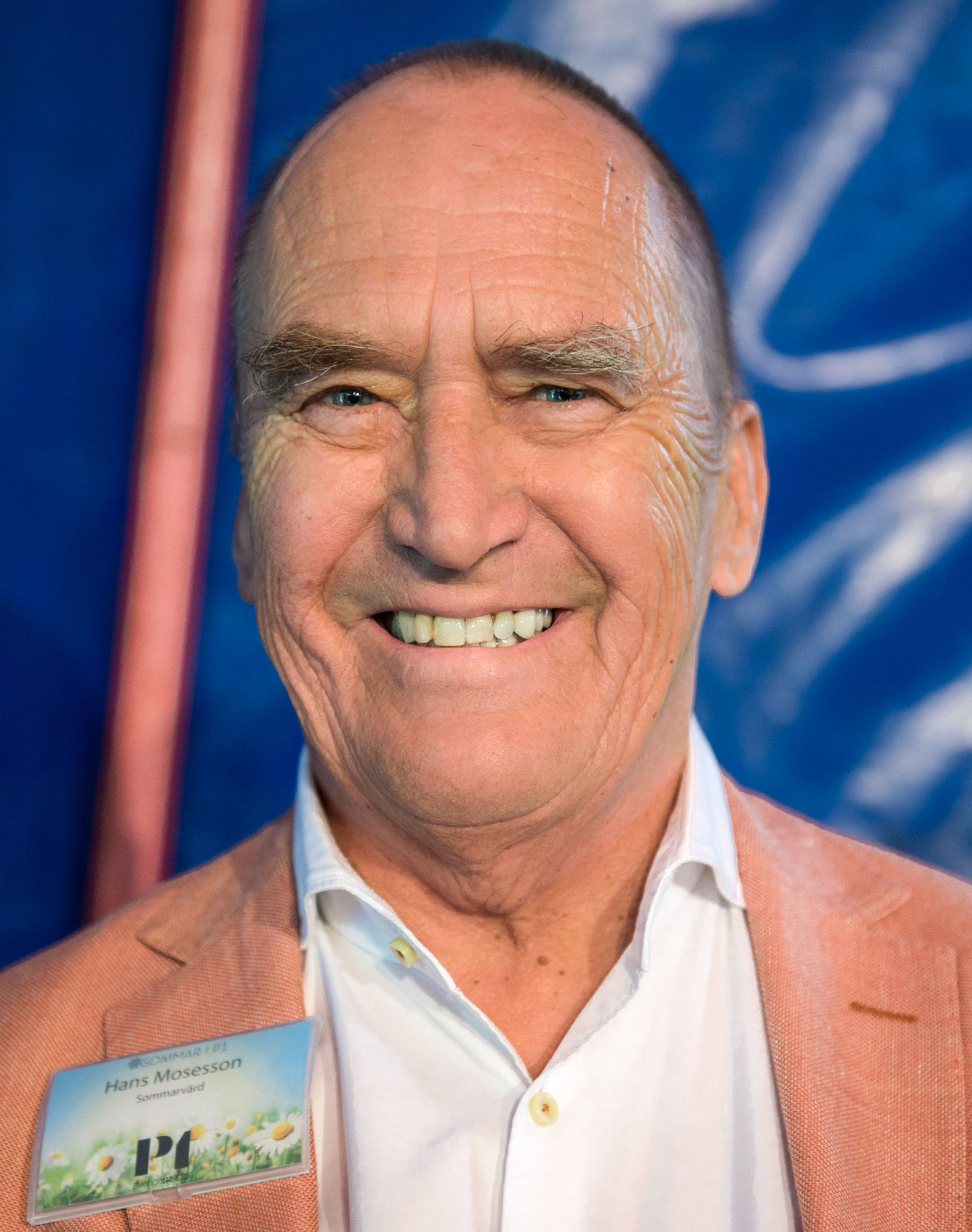
- Mosesson in 2015
- Born: Hans Kristoffer Mosesson; 1 August 1944; Stockholm, Sweden
- Died: 25 October 2023 (aged 79)
- Occupations: Actor; musician

Hans Kristoffer Mosesson (1 August 1944 – 25 October 2023) was a Swedish actor and musician.

== Life and career ==
Hans Mosesson was born in the Enskede district of Stockholm. He studied medicine at the University of Lund in the 1970s. In Lund, he met the newly founded leftist theatre and musical group Nationalteatern, and Mosesson quit his studies and joined the group and moved with them to Gothenburg. He both wrote and sang the songs "Plast's sång" and "Lägg av!", among others.

Mosesson featured in many Swedish films and TV-productions. During the 2000s he was a household face in Sweden as he starred as the grocer Stig in the first 512 episodes of the long-running weekly advert series for the grocery chain ICA from 2001 to January 2015.

Mosesson died on 25 October 2023, at the age of 79.

== Filmography ==
- Första Kärleken (1992)
- A Life for the Taking (1995)
- Andra Avenyn (2010)
- Den Onda Ringen (2013)
- Jordskott (2015)
