= Cissi Wallin =

Swedish actress

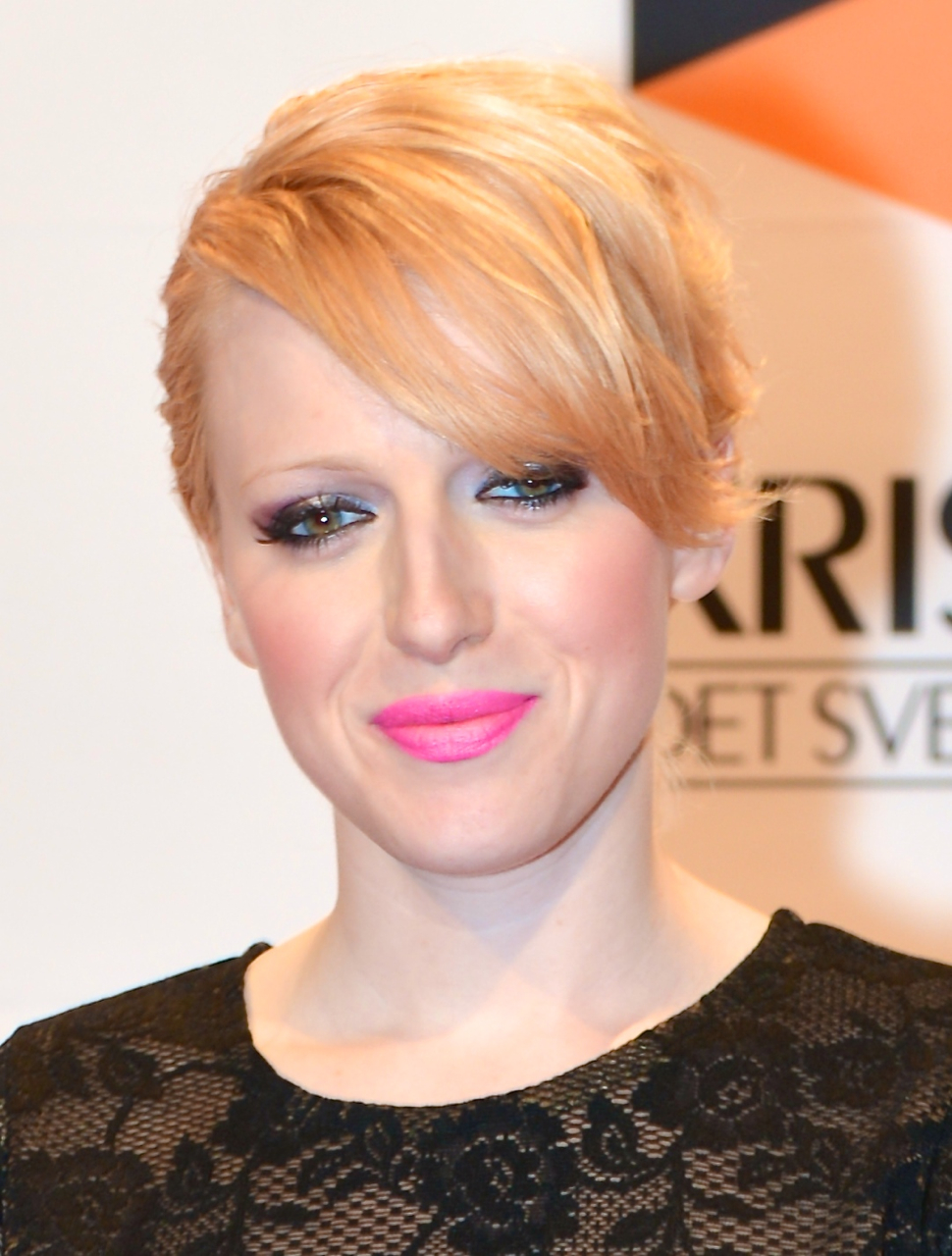
Cissi Wallin in August 2013

Cecilia "Cissi" Wallin (born 12 March 1985) is a Swedish actress, television and radio personality.

== Biography ==
Wallin was born in Uddevalla to Polish parents. She made her film debut in 2005 with the role as the character Millan in the Ulf Malmros film Tjenare kungen. She also had a role in the film Sommaren med Göran alongside David Hellenius. She has also been a presenter for the Radio1 radio station. She also operates the C. Wallin Production A/S media company along with Daniel Breitholtz.

=== Defamation case ===
During #MeToo, Wallin claimed on Instagram that journalist Fredrik Virtanen raped her in 2006, which she reported to police in 2011, where he was not prosecuted due to difficulties to prove the case. In December 2019, Wallin was sentenced by the Stockholm District Court to probation and made to pay over 110,000 SEK in damages for grave defamation. Wallin said she would appeal the conviction.

The case centered around the Swedish defamation law, where even if a story is true it can be considered defamatory if there is not enough public interest in its publication.

Wallin's legal case has drawn international attention. In 2022, after her conviction, The New York Times published an article about Wallin and Sweden's "MeToo" movement.

Svea Court of Appeal upheld the decision in 2022.

Later in 2022, Virtanen also sued Wallin's book for libel, and demanded all copies be destroyed, but lost in court. The book was translated to Norwegian whereupon Virtanen tried to sue Wallin even there, but later withdrew his case.

== Filmography ==
- 2005 – Tjenare Kungen
- 2009 – Sommaren med Göran – En midsommarnattskomedi

== Books ==
- 2020 - Allt som var mitt : historien som inte får berättas
