= Gert Fylking =

Swedish politician

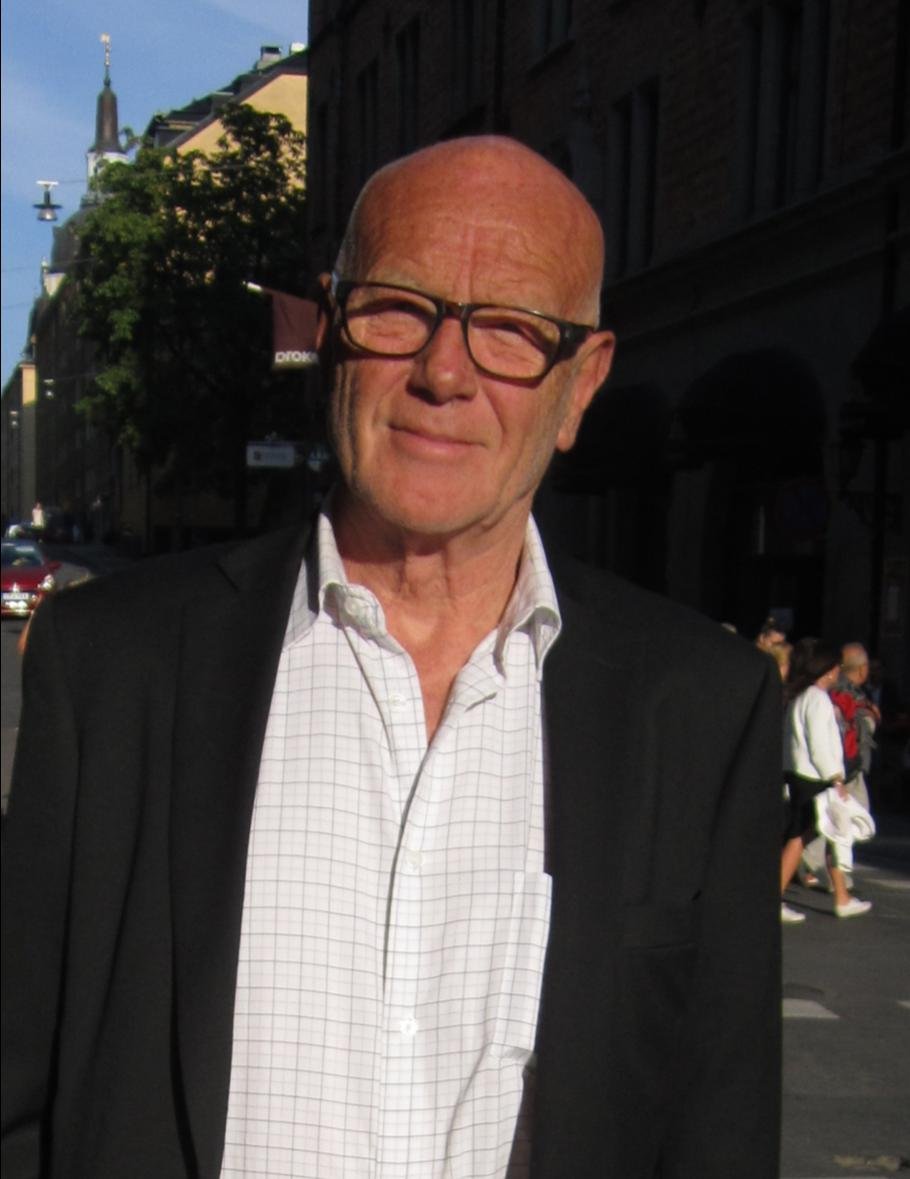
- Fylking in 2014
- Born: Gert Åke Fylking; 7 October 1945 (age 80); Stockholm, Sweden
- Occupations: Actor; journalist; politician; host
- Years active: 1984–present
- Spouse: Tanja Fylking (m. 2001; div. 2016)
- Partner: Maria Kulle
- Children: 6

Gert Åke Fylking (born 7 October 1945) is a Swedish actor, journalist, politician (Christian Democrat) and host of the radio programme Gert's Värld on Radio 1 101,9 FM, where he is known by the nickname of Fylking Sverige (a handle translatable as Your Man Fylking of Sweden). He has participated in many theatre productions, films and TV programmes. He is married to Tanja Fylking; they have six children and live in Stockholm. Among his friends are Robert Aschberg, Hasse Aro and Lennart Jähkel, and especially the late Christer Pettersson (since their childhood).

== Life ==
Fylking grew up in Stockholm and spent large parts of his youth in the Stockholm Archipelago. He joined the Swedish Forces at the Älvsborg Coastal Artillery Regiment (KA 4) in Gothenburg in 1966. He was then sent as a platoon commander to the "Coastal Hunter" School at Vaxholm's Coastal Artillery Regiment (KA 1). He enrolled in the Royal Naval Academy.

Fylking has previously been noted for its association with the nationwide-known criminal and addict Christer Pettersson.

== Radio host ==
Presently, together with Titti Schultz and Roger Nordin, Gert Fylking is anchorman of the show noted above. He is also known for bursting out in a loud sarcastic exclamation ("Äntligen!" - meaning: "Finally!") at the press conference where the name of the winner of the Nobel Prize in Literature (Gao Xingjian) was announced in 2000, doing so again in 2001. Despite condemnations from the Swedish Academy, and futile attempts to have him banned from further announcements, he proclaimed he had made peace with Horace Engdahl and gone out to dine with him on occasion. A tradition of exclaiming - especially over broadly unknown laureates - was taken over by other journalists who continue to exercise it. The friendship with Engdahl has been reported as on-again-off-again.

== Controversy ==
On 17 April 2012, Fylking likened Serbs to Anders Behring Breivik on his show Gert's Värld (Gert's World). While talking about the Norwegian mass murderer, Fylking mentioned that "the world is full of these Breivik characters", and continued: "We’ve managed to catch many others as well. We caught these Serbians who acted like bloody swine and killed hundreds of thousands of fleeing people. We caught them. But do you think they are judged by the Serbians? No, the Serbians hail them as heroes. So who are the psychopaths? Is it the majority of the Serbian population that are stupid or is it just these people who are convicted of war crimes that are idiots?"

After strong public reaction including a letter of protest to the station by Serbia's ambassador to Stockholm, Dušan Crnogorčević, Fylking apologized for the statements, but was suspended from work indefinitely.

== Selected filmography ==
- 2006 - Bilar (Cars - film)
- 2002 - Heja Björn (TV series)
- 1997 - Adam & Eva
- 1996 - Evil Ed
- 1996 - Silvermannen (The Silver Man - Miniseries)
- 1994 - Rapport till himlen (Report to Heaven - Miniseries)
- 1992 - Nordexpressen (The Northern Express)
- 1992 - Ha ett underbart liv (Have a Wonderful Life)
- 1992 - Hassel - Svarta banken (Hassel - The Black Bank)
- 1984 - The Man from Majorca
