= Göran Rosenberg =

Swedish journalist and author

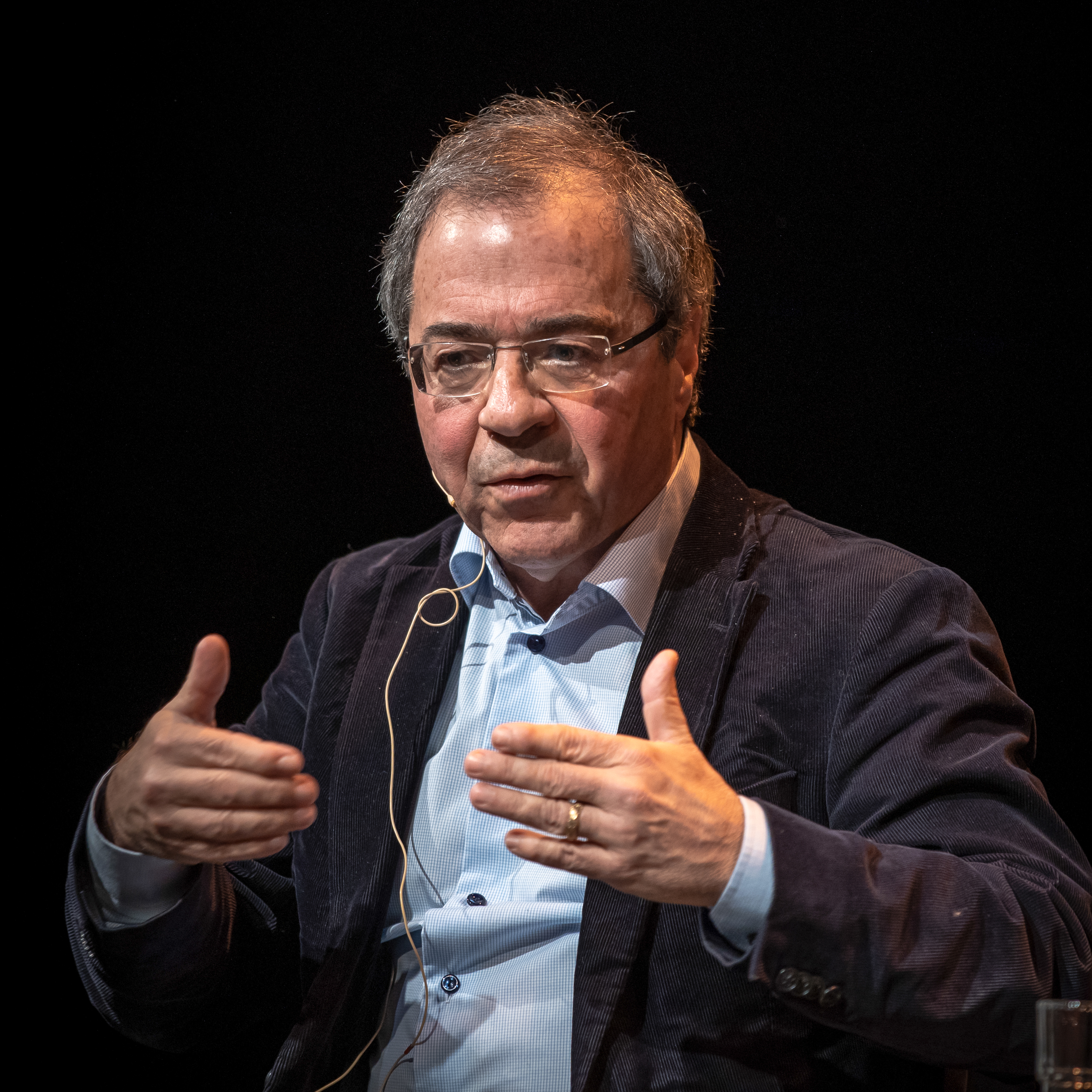
- Born: 11 October 1948 (age 78); Södertälje, Sweden
- Occupations: Writer and journalist
- Partner: Jayne Svenungsson
- Website: www.rosenberg.se

Göran Jakob Rosenberg (born 11 October 1948) is a Swedish journalist and author.

== Biography and career ==
Rosenberg was born in Södertälje, Sweden, the son of survivors of the Holocaust. He has written about his father's story and his childhood in the book A Brief Stop on the Road from Auschwitz (2012). The book won the August Prize for literature in 2012 and has been translated in 12 languages. His personal history on Israel and Zionism ('Det förlorade landet', Bonniers 1996) has been published in German as 'Das Verlorene Land', Suhrkamp Jüdischer Verlag (1998), in French as 'L'utopie perdue', Denoël (2000), and in English as Israel, a Personal History (2025).

Rosenberg worked at Sveriges Radio and Sveriges Television between 1972 and 1989, from 1985 to 1989 as the Washington-based US correspondent of Swedish Television. In 1990 he founded the monthly magazine Moderna Tider, of which he was editor-in-chief until 1999. Between 1991 and 2011 he was a columnist at Dagens Nyheter. Between 2012 and 2023 he was a monthly columnist at Swedish Radio. He currently writes essays, reviews and commentaries for the Swedish daily Expressen.

== Awards and recognitions, selection ==
- 1993 Stora Journalistpriset
- 2000 Honorary degree at the University of Gothenburg
- 2012 August Prize for A Brief Stop on the Road from Auschwitz
- 2014 Prix du Meilleur Livre Étranger Essay for A Brief Stop on the Road from Auschwitz

== Selected bibliography ==
- 1991 – Friare kan ingen vara: den amerikanska idén från revolution till Reagan
- 1993 – Medborgaren som försvann
- 1994 – Da Capo al Fine
- 1996 – Det förlorade landet -en personlig historia
- 2000 – Tankar om journalistik
- 2004 – Plikten, profiten och konsten att vara människa
- 2006 – Utan facit
- 2012 – A Brief Stop on the Road from Auschwitz
- 2021 – Rabbi Marcus Ehrenpreis obesvarade kärlek (The Unrequited Love of Rabbi Marcus Ehrenpreis)
- 2025 – Israel, a Personal History
- 2025 – I lögnens tid : essäer och kommentarer medan tornet rasade (In the Time of Lies: Essays and Commentary While the Tower Fell)
