= Nisti Stêrk =

Swedish actress and comedian (born 1977)

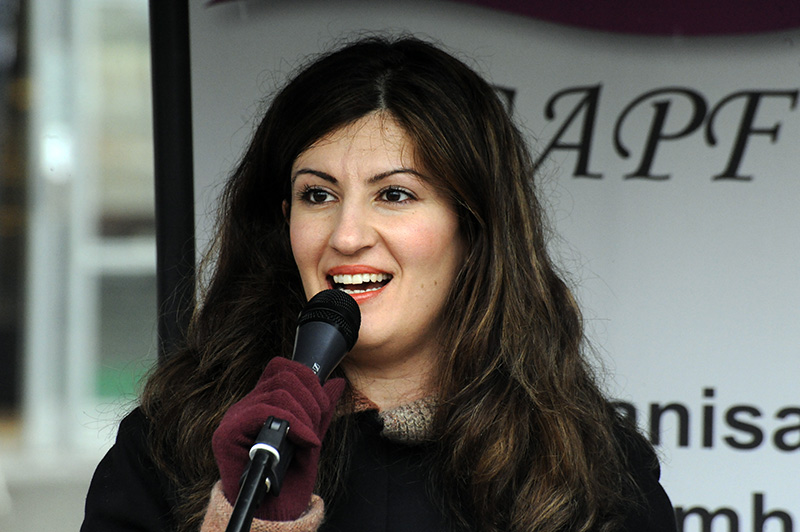
- Stêrk in 2015
- Born: 1977 (age 48–49)
- Occupations: Actress; comedian; writer; filmmaker

Nisti Stêrk (born 1977) is a Swedish actress, comedian, writer, and filmmaker.

She is of Kurdish descent and moved to Sweden at the age of six.

Stêrk has created the character Zeyno, a pedantic "laundrywoman", who she has played in Utbildningsradion, in the Stockholm City Theatre and in Maximteatern. She has also played in Elektras systrar, (director Michael Cocke) and in Suzanne Ostens Kabaret Underordning. She has been written chronicles in Stockholm City and Göteborgs-Posten. In 2006 she wrote the children's book Ramazan från Diyarbakir i Turkiet.

In August 2008, her book Så länge Gud vill och rumpan håller! got published. It is partly a biography and a celebration to dreams that can come true and an encouragement to the reader to not give up their dreams.

In 2009, Nisti Stêrk hosted a talkshow at the new kurdish TV channel TRT6 in Turkey. The Talk show was called Gulfiroş and Nisti hosted it together with the Turkish pop star Berdan Mardini.

== Theatre ==
- För Sverige i tiden (Maximteatern/National Swedish Touring Theatre) 2007/2008
- The good body (National Swedish Touring Theatre) 2006
- Zeynos värld (Stadsteatern/Maximteatern/National Swedish Touring Theatre) 2005/2006
- Kabaret Underordning (Stadsteatern) 2005
- China – En ugandisk barnsoldat (Stadsteatern) 2005
- Elektras systrar (Uppsala stadsteater/Stockholm City Theatre/Fryshuset) 2004
- Stockholm City serenad (Kulturhuvudstads årsproduktion) 1998

== Film ==
- När mörkret faller 2006
- Wellkåmm to Verona 2005

== TV ==
- Asien från ovan (svensk berättarröst) 2015
- Gulfiros, talkshow i Turkiet (TRT6) 2009
- Singing bee, (Kanal5) 2009
- Doobidoo, (svt) 2008
- Sing a long, (svt) 2007
- Allsång på Skansen (svt) 2006
- Leende guldbruna ögon (svt) 2006
- Lasermannen (svt) 2006
- Graven (svt) 2005
- Testa ditt val (svt) 2006
- Faktum (svt) 2005
- Svt Nöjespanel 2005
- TV 4 panel 2005
- Zeynos värld (Ur/Svt) 2004
- C/o Segemyhr 2004
- OP 7 (kanal 5) 2001

== Radio ==
- Sommarvärd "Sommar" i P1 2006
- Du gamla du fria 2006
- Ingen vill veta var du köpt din slöja 2005
- Soppåse till himmelen 2004
- Tuff kurd i lyxförpackning 2004
- Dö i luften 2000

== Scripts ==
- För Sverige i tiden 2007
- Du gamla du fria 2006
- Zeynos värld 2005
- Ingen vill veta var du köpt din slöja 2004

== Books ==
- Så länge Gud vill och rumpan håller (Cordia) 2008
- Ramazan från Diyarbakir i Turkiet 2006

== Chronicles ==
- Stockholm City
- Göteborgsposten
- Nummer
- Akt

== Awards ==
- 2003 Årets ståuppare
- 2004 Fadime-priset
- 2006 Radiopriset
- 2006 Stallbrödernas Bosse Parnevik-stipendium
- 2006 Kommunala landstingets stipendium
