= Fredrik Virtanen =

Swedish journalist

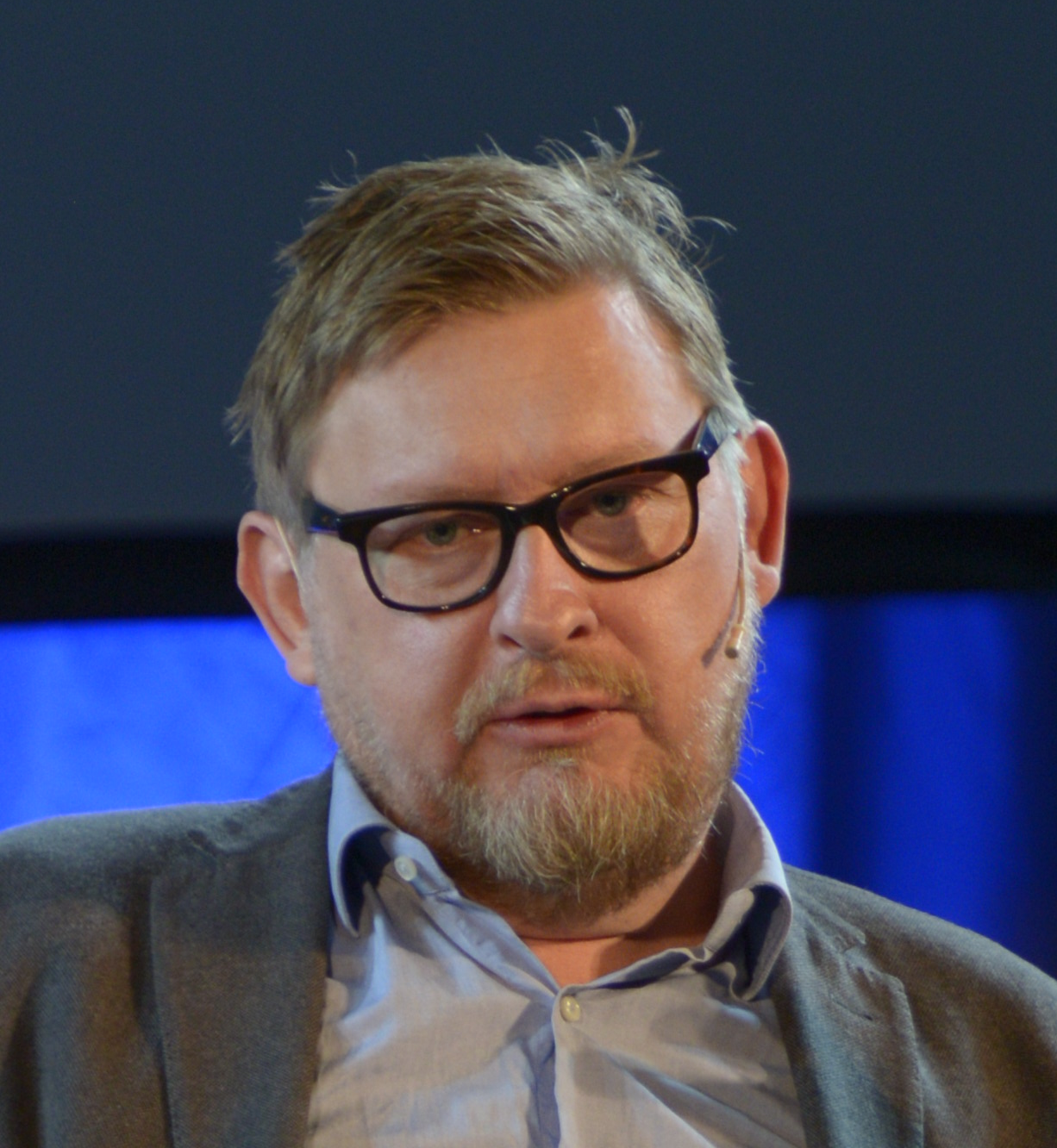
Virtanen in May, 2019

Karl Fredrik Virtanen (born 15 November 1971 in Motala, Östergötland County) is a Swedish journalist and former columnist for the Swedish newspaper Aftonbladet and the host for the talk show Studio Virtanen on Swedish TV8. He has also hosted radio shows for Sveriges Radio. For Aftonbladet, he was the New York City correspondent, contributing weekly columns about life in the city. He also reported on entertainment, such as the Eurovision Song Contest.

In October 2017, the Swedish media reported accusations from multiple women of Virtanen's sexual assault and sexual harassment after the hashtag Me Too went viral. In 2019, the District Attorney's Office in Stockholm prosecuted Cissi Wallin, one of the women accusing Virtanen, with aggravated criminal defamation. She was given a suspended sentence and ordered to pay 90,000 kronor in damages to Virtanen. Wallin said she would be appealing the sentence.

Fredrik Virtanen wrote the Swedish and Norwegian book Utan nåd (No Mercy) about controversial journalism during the Swedish Me Too movement.

In 2020 Aftonbladet purchased and published an article by Virtanen; Karin Pettersson, head of Culture in Aftonbladet, said that she did not believe in being banned from one's profession.

Virtanen is of Finnish descent through his father, who came to Sweden as a Finnish war child during World War II.

== Bibliography ==
- Olyckligt kär i ingen speciell (2006)
- Kraschad (2009)
- Utan nåd (2019)
