= Ulf Malmros =

Swedish screenwriter and film director (born 1965)

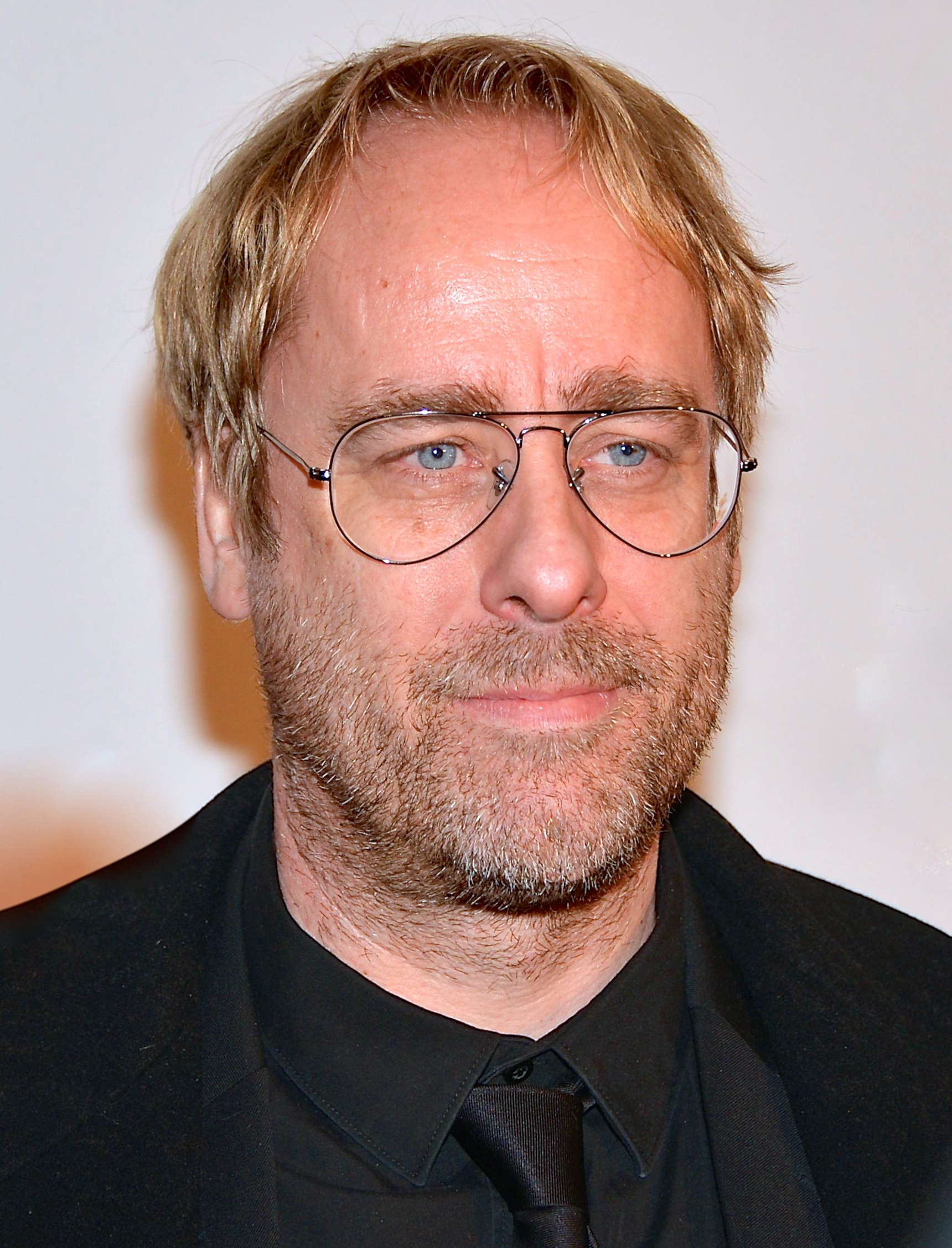
- Ulf Malmros at Guldbaggegalan 2013.
- Born: Ulf Peter Vilhelm Malmros; 16 March 1965 (age 60); Molkom, Värmland, Sweden
- Occupations: Screenwriter, film director
- Years active: 1989–present
- Spouse: Jaana Fomin

Ulf Peter Vilhelm Malmros (born 16 March 1965) is a Swedish screenwriter and film director.

== Career ==
Aged 13 Malmros started making home movies. Later he moved to Stockholm and studied at Dramatiska Institutet.

In 2006 Malmros received the Guldbagge Award for "best directing" with Tjenare Kungen. In 2010 he received a "Guldbagge" for the "best manuscript" which was the manuscript of his 2009 film Bröllopsfotografen.

In 2010 Malmros hosted the Sveriges Radio program Sommar.

== Style and trademarks ==
Many of Malmros' films refer to his birth province Värmland. He also frequently casts the same actors including Kjell Bergqvist, Tuva Novotny and Björn Starrin.

== Selected filmography ==
- 1992 – Ha ett underbart liv (director)
- 1994 – Rapport till himlen (TV) (director and screenwriter)
- 1996 – Silvermannen (TV) (director and screenwriter)
- 1999 – Sally (TV) (director and screenwriter)
- 2000 – På gränsen (TV) (screenwriter)
- 2000 – Den bästa sommaren (director and screenwriter)
- 2002 – Bäst i Sverige! (director)
- 2003 – Slim Susie (director and screenwriter)
- 2005 – Tjenare Kungen (director and screenwriter)
- 2006 – Mäklarna (TV) (director and screenwriter)
- 2009 – Bröllopsfotografen (director and screenwriter)
- 2012 – Mammas pojkar (director and screenwriter)
- 2014 – Min så kallade pappa (director and screenwriter)
