= Titti Schultz =

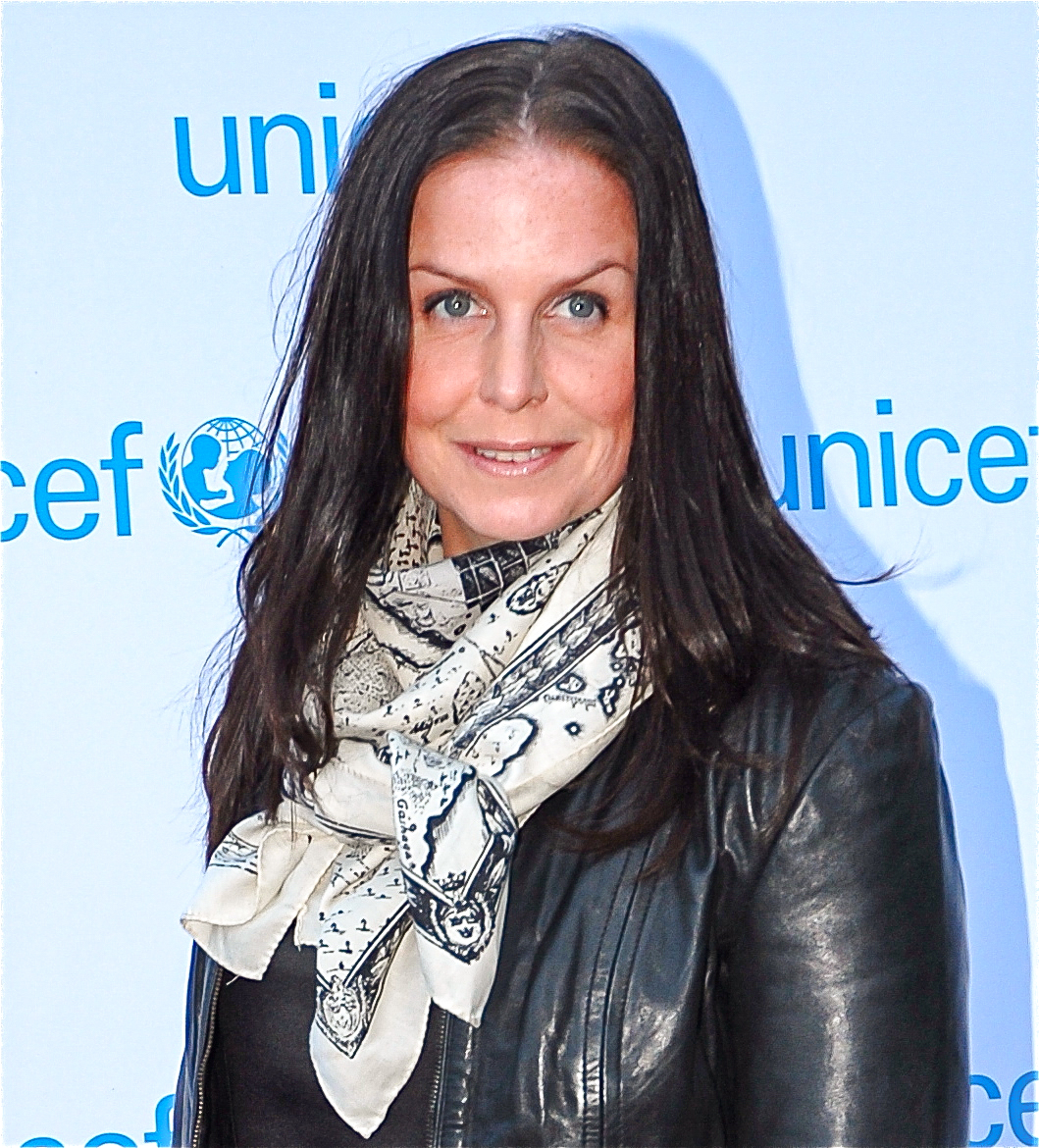
Titti Schultz (2017)

Titti Maria Christina Schultz (born May 25, 1972, in Gävle, Sweden) is a Swedish radio presenter, compere, and moderator. She is currently working as a radio presenter at Swedish Radio's talk show P4 Extra.

Earlier in her career, Schultz hosted shows at RIX FM and NRJ, Rix Morronzoo, Eftermiddag med Erik & Titti, and Vakna med Roger. In 2016, she won the Talarforum "Årets Talare" prize in the Moderator category.
