= Clausen =

Clausen is a Danish patronymic surname, literally meaning child of Claus, Claus being a German form of the Greek Νικόλαος, Nikolaos, (cf. Nicholas), used in Denmark at least since the 16th century. The spelling variant Klausen has identical pronunciation (as does the often interchangeable Claussen). The two variants are number 34 and 85 on the top 100 of surnames in Denmark. Occurrences of Clausen/Klausen as a surname outside Denmark and Schleswig-Holstein are due to immigration. Immigrants to English-speaking countries sometimes changed the spelling to Clauson.

Notable people with the name include:

- Aaron Clausen (born 1977), American politician
- Ahrensborg Clausen (1895–1967), Danish cyclist
- Alden W. Clausen (1923–2013), American businessman
- Alf Clausen (1941–2025), American film and television composer
- Andrea Clausen (born 1959), German actress
- Andrea Clausen (politician) (born 1971), British-born Falkland Islands civil servant
- Bitten Clausen (1912–2016), Danish factory owner
- Bruno Clausen (1912–1957), Danish sailor
- Casey Clausen (born 1981), American football player and coach
- Charles H. Clausen (1842–1922), American soldier in the American Civil War
- Charlie Clausen (born 1977), Australian actor
- Christian Clausen (born 1955), Danish banker
- Claus Clausen (actor) (1899–1989), German actor
- Claus Kristian Randolph Clausen (1869–1958), American Navy officer
- Connie Clausen (1923–1997), American actress, author, and literary agent
- Curt Clausen (born 1967), American race walker
- Curtis P. Clausen (1893–1976), American entomologist
- Dick Clausen (1912–2000), American football coach and administrator
- Don Clausen (1923–2015), American politician
- Dustin Clausen, American-Canadian mathematician
- Emma Clausen (born 1867), German-American poet, translator, and anarchist
- Erik Clausen (1942–2024), Danish actor
- Erik Briand Clausen (1901–1945), Danish resistance member
- Erwin Clausen (1911–1943), German fighter ace and Knight's Cross recipient
- Eyvind Clausen (1939–2013), Danish footballer
- Franciska Clausen (1899–1986), Danish painter
- Frederick G. Clausen (1848–1940), Danish-born American architect
- Frederik Kiehn Clausen (born 1995), Danish handball player
- Freya Clausen (born 1978), Musical artist
- Frimann Falck Clausen (1921–1983), Norwegian actor
- Frithjof Clausen (1916–1998), Norwegian wrestler
- Frits Clausen (1893–1947), Danish national socialist politician
- Fritz Clausen (1869–1960), American baseball player
- George Clausen (1852–1944), British artist
- Greg Clausen (born 1947), American politician
- Hans Clausen (born 1971), Danish speedway rider
- Haukur Clausen (1928–2003), Icelandic athletics competitor
- Henning Clausen (born 1939), Danish sports shooter
- Henrik Clausen (born 1971), Danish football manager
- Henrik Nicolai Clausen (1793–1877), Danish theologian and politician
- Henrik Ræder Clausen (born 1963), Danish politician
- Henry Clausen (1905–1992), American lawyer
- Herluf Stenholt Clausen (1921–2002), Danish ichthyologist
- Hermann Clausen (1885–1962), German politician
- Ian Clausen, American philosopher
- Jens Clausen (1891–1969), a Danish-American botanist and geneticist
- Jimmy Clausen (born 1987), US football player
- John Adam Clausen (1914–1996), American sociologist
- Jørgen Mads Clausen (born 1948), Danish industry magnate
- Kasper Klausen (born 1982), Danish footballer
- Kristoffer Clausen, Norwegian media personality
- Lars Clausen (1935–2010), German sociologist
- Luke Clausen, American fisherman
- Mads Clausen (1905–1966), Danish industrialist
- Mads Clausen (footballer) (born 1984), Norwegian footballer
- Mads Clausen (born 2002), Danish footballer
- Meredith Clausen (born 1942), American architectural historian
- Néstor Clausen (born 1962), Argentine footballer
- Nicolai Clausen (1911–1943), German U-boat commander
- Peter Clausen (naturalist) (nineteenth century, dates unclear), Danish natural history collector
- Raymond M. Clausen Jr. (1947–2004), U.S. Marine Corps, Medal of Honor recipient
- René Clausen (born 1953), American composer
- Rick Clausen (born 1982), American football player
- Roy Elwood Clausen (1891–1956), American botanist and geneticist
- Sally Clausen (born 1945), American educational administrator
- Thomas Clausen (mathematician) (1801–1885), Danish mathematician and astronomer
- Thomas Clausen (musician) (born 1949), Danish jazz pianist
- Thomas Clausen (Louisiana) (1939–2002), American education superintendent
- Þórunn Erna Clausen (born 1975), Icelandic actress and songwriter

== See also ==
- Claussen
- Clauson
