= Danfoss Compressors GmbH =

Danfoss Group subsidiary

- Type: GmbH (private company)
- Industry: Refrigeration and cooling compressors
- Founded: 1956
- Defunct: 2010 (sold and renamed by new owner)
- Headquarters: Flensburg, Germany

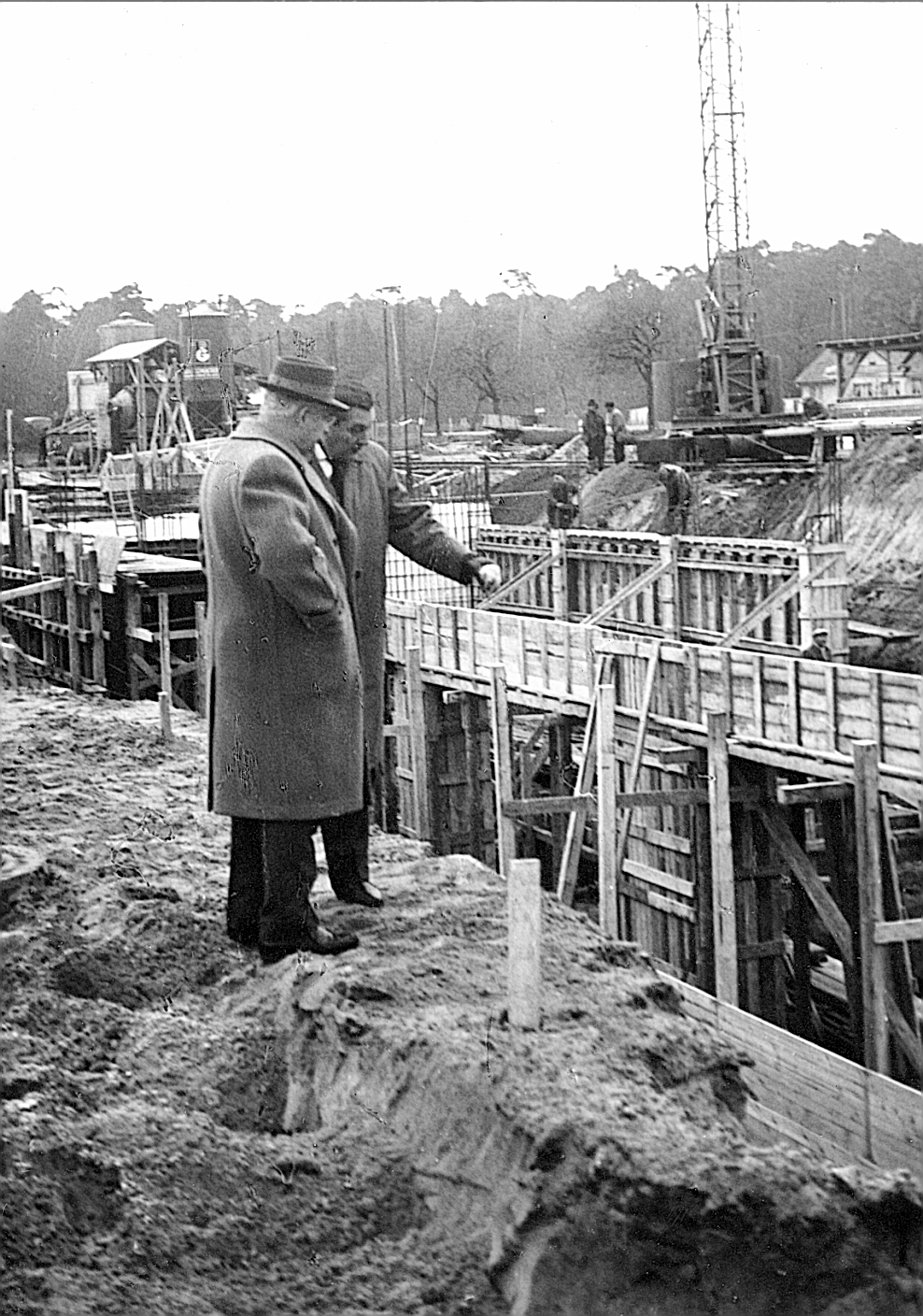
Mads Clausen at the construction site of a plant in Flensburg, Germany, in 1956.

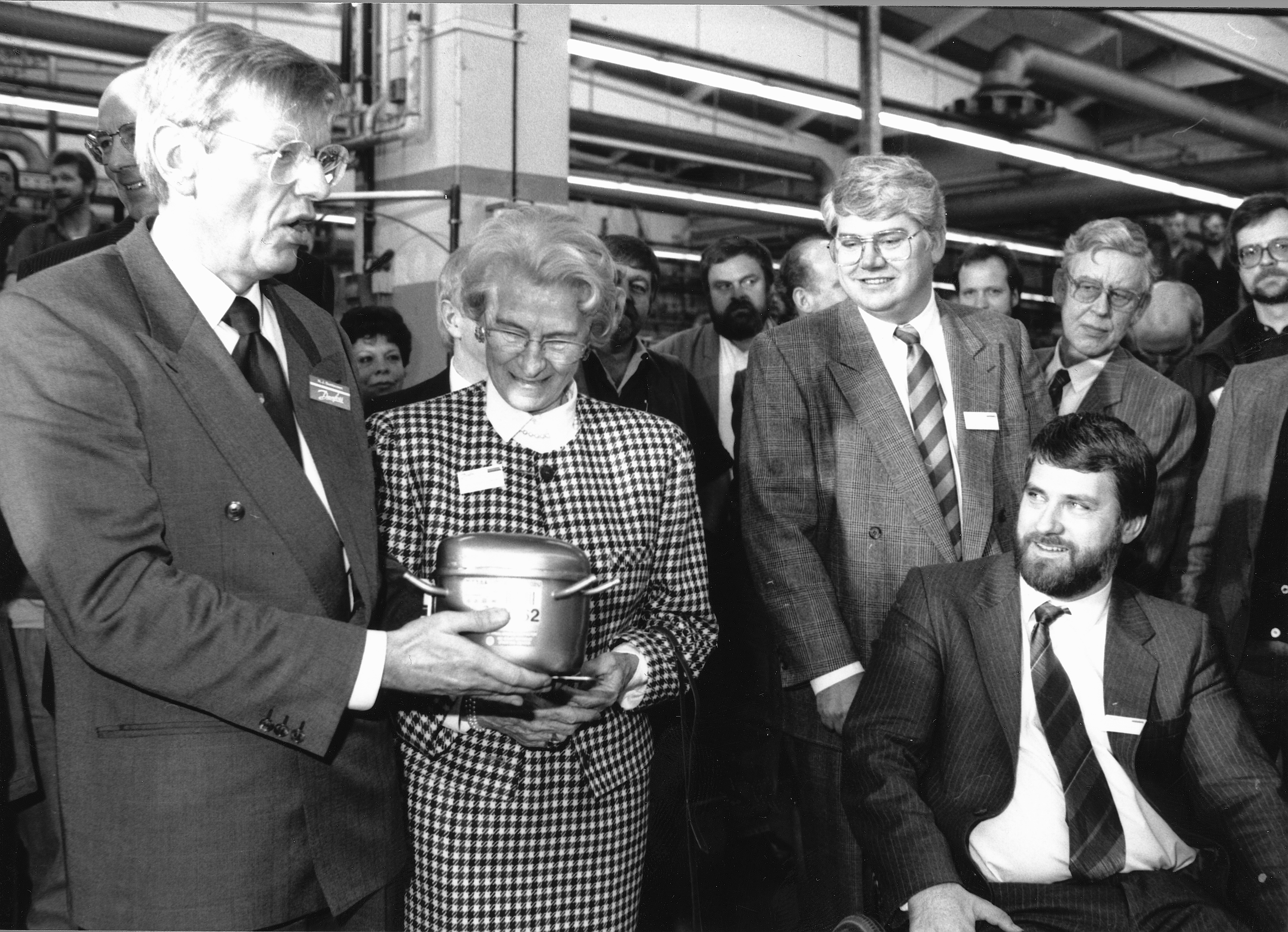
Compressor No. 100,000,000. From left: Director H. J. Gustavsen, Bitten Clausen, Jørgen M. Clausen and Peter J.M. Clausen.

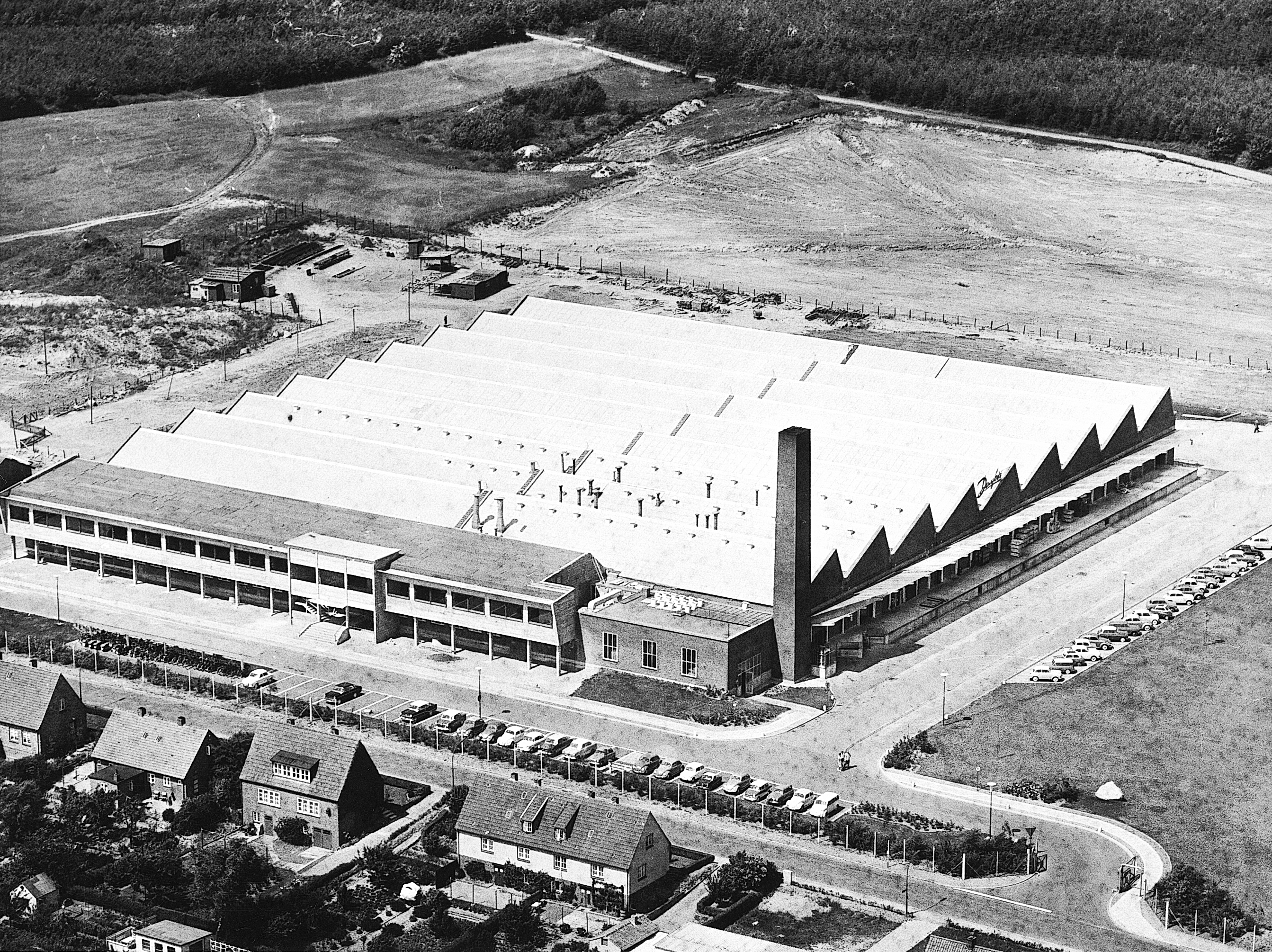
Danfoss Compressors plant in Flensburg, late 1950s.

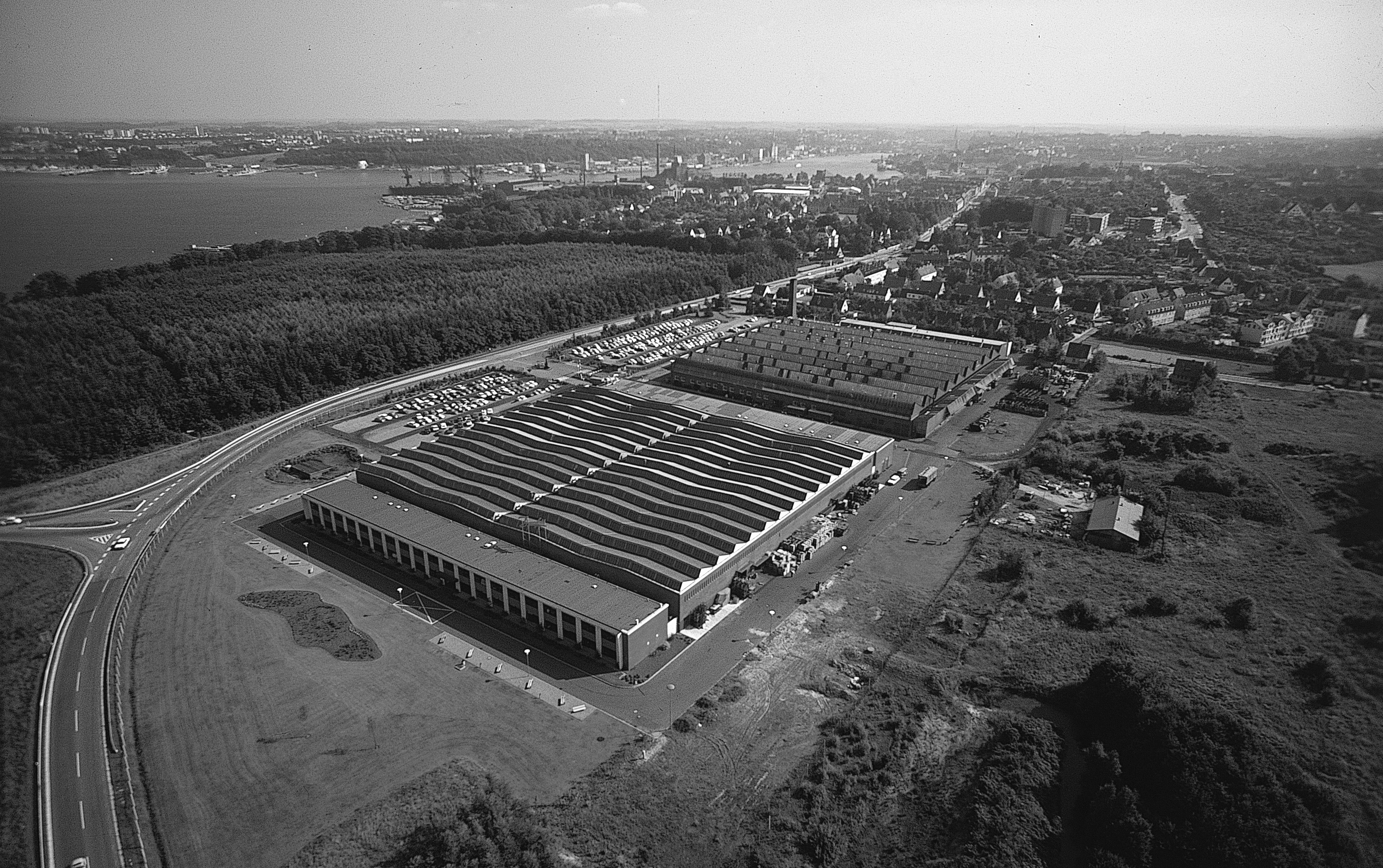
Danfoss Compressors plant in Flensburg with an extended production area, ca. 1960s/70s.

Danfoss Compressors GmbH was a subsidiary of the Danfoss Group, a Danish manufacturer of valves and fluid-handling products, from 1956 to 2010. It produced hermetic compressors for household appliances and mobile cooling.

In 2010, the Danfoss Group sold Danfoss Compressors GmbH to the Munich-based industrial holding company Aurelius AG and established a new brand under the name Secop GmbH.

== Founding ==
In 1933, Mads Clausen, an engineer specializing in air conditioning and refrigeration, established the Danish Cooling Automatic and Appliance Factory in his boyhood attic room in Elsmark, on the Danish island of Als. He started producing automatic valves for refrigeration plants, which previously had to be imported from the United States.

Clausen's initial budget was small, and his equipment consisted of a manual air pump and a zinc trough for testing the valves. The business would eventually become Danfoss A/S, the largest industrial group in Denmark. Its headquarters were also located in Elsmark, in the Nordborg community.

Between 1935 and 1938, the company introduced a long list of valve and thermostat products, including automatic spring valves, ball float valves, pressure-controlled valves, diaphragm valves, suction valves, constant-pressure valves, room thermostats and drying filters. A logo reading "Danfoss"—a portmanteau of the Danish words "Danmark" (Denmark) and "fosser" (to stream or sparkle)—was attached to all valves.

The company's valves, especially the thermostatic ones that Clausen developed, became its best-known products. Its energy-saving thermostats were not a major success until the energy crisis of the 1970s, when new legislation made the use of thermostat valves obligatory.

In 1946, the word from the logo became the official company name, and Danfoss opened an office in Copenhagen with 261 employees.

== Compressor production ==
After the Second World War, the development of affordable individual cooling technologies threatened the success of Danfoss' main product, the expansion valve for large cooling plants. American companies had developed comparatively small hermetic compressors for use in home refrigerators. In Denmark, a few companies also set up production lines for hermetic compressors. Clausen decided to do the same.

During a trip to the United States and Canada in the fall of 1950, Clausen visited several manufacturers of hermetic compressors and gathered information, not only about technical specifications, but also about organisational details, compensation and output optimisation. On January 1, 1952, he entered a licensing agreement with Tecumseh Products. The agreement allowed Danfoss to manufacture hermetic compressors and sell them in any country except for the US, Canada, Great Britain and Ireland. The production in Nordborg started in 1951.

The first compressor, P 101, was nicknamed "Pancake" because of its flat appearance. It influenced the development of refrigerators as household appliances in Europe. In 1952, Danfoss sold 5,000 Pancake compressors, which accounted for 10% of the company's production. Over the years, the compressor business made up 25 to 35% of the Danfoss Group's sales.

== History ==
1956: Danfoss relocates its compressor production to Flensburg, in northern Germany, and the limited company Danfoss Compressors GmbH is established.

1958: Production of hermetic compressors begins. Danfoss distributes its first PW compressors, which begin to replace the Pancake type. Productivity increases from 1,000 compressors per week at the beginning of the year to 1,750 per week at the end.

1959: The Danfoss plant begins operating on two shifts, producing 8,000 units per week. Its biggest customers are Bauknecht, Siemens and Bosch, manufacturers of household refrigerators.

1960: The company begins using synthetic materials and oils for greater stability in low as well as high temperatures.

1961: Danfoss becomes an incorporated company. Mads Clausen assumes the chairmanship of the board.

1966: Clausen dies on August 27. His wife, Bitten, takes over the chairmanship, and Andreas Jepsen becomes managing director.

1968: The number of Danfoss employees in Flensburg reaches 1,372.

1970: The company's second plant—whose foundation stone was laid in the mid-1960s, when demand for household compressors rose sharply—is completed. The number of employees surpasses 2,000. A new compressor line and the PTC starter for light commercial appliances are introduced.

1972: Annual revenue rises to 1 billion kroner. The company introduces the FR compressor line using the R134a refrigerant. The compressor is designed for smaller appliances like beverage coolers, water dispensers, vending machines, cooling cabinets and ice-making machines, as well as heat pumps and dehumidifiers.

1974: Production of the TL compressor starts, and more than one million units are sold in 18 months. As of 2008, more than 100 million TL devices were in use in refrigerators worldwide.

1977: Danfoss builds its 50 millionth compressor and introduces DC powered compressors for use in mobile cooling devices.

1985: Revenue reaches 5 billion kroner (150 million US$ or 125 million euros).

1988: Production and sales are centralised in Flensburg. Danfoss Compressors takes over the production of condensing units from the Danfoss plant in Offenbach, which would be shut down in 1993. Revenue reaches 6.3 billion kroner (1 billion US$ or 846 million euros).

1989: The company delivers its 100 millionth compressor.

1993: Danfoss begins using isobutane as a refrigerant, replacing R134a. It also builds a new production facility for compressors in Črnomelj, Slovenia.

1995: Danfoss Compressors S.A. de C.V. begins production in Mexico.

1997: The company produces its 150 millionth compressor. Revenue reaches 13.1 billion kroner (2.09 billion US$ or 1.75 billion euros).

1999: Danfoss begins using R290, a propane-based refrigerant. Sales total 1.978 million euros for the year. The number of employees reaches 18,860.

2001: 200 million compressors have been produced, and the electronic starter device ePTC is introduced.

2002: Danfoss Compressors spol. s.r.o. begins production in Zlaté Moravce, Slovakia.

2003: The company introduces compressors for solar appliances and others that use carbon dioxide as a refrigerant.

2006: Compressor production in Mexico is halted.

2008: TOOL4COOL®, software for the flexible control of refrigeration plants, is introduced, and a production site opens in Wuqing, China.

2010: On November 29, the company's acquisition by Aurelius AG becomes legally binding.

== Decline and acquisition ==
In 2005, after years of financial losses, the board of directors announced that Danfoss would lay off 700 employees.

On May 27, 2009, Danfoss announced that it would cease production in Flensburg within a year and lay off another 450 employees in response to the 2008 financial crisis. The company's chief operations officer, Kim Fausing, reported that its household compressors business was incurring millions in losses. Politicians appealed to Danfoss executives to reconsider, saying that keeping the production plant in Flensburg would give a positive signal for the German-Danish economic region, but the company went forward with the closing. The Flensburg headquarters continued to house the company's research and development, sales, and product support departments.

Aurelius AG acquired Danfoss Compressors in 2010. According to Nis Storgaard, chief development officer of the Danfoss Group, the reason for the sale was the parent company's decision to concentrate on other areas of the climate and energy sector. The acquisition included all business in Germany, China, Slovenia and Slovakia, with approximately 3,000 employees. In the course of the acquisition, Danfoss Compressors was renamed Secop.

Aurelius and Danfoss did not disclose the value of the acquisition. According to estimates in the media, it was a small deal for Danfoss, which had 26,000 employees worldwide and annual sales of about 3.4 billion euros at the time. For Aurelius, however, with revenue of 760 million euros in 2009, it was a major expansion.
