= Rupp =

Rupp or RUPP can refer to:

- Rational Unified Process Product
- Royal University of Phnom Penh
- Roads used as public paths,

Rights of way in England and Wales
Rights of way in Scotland

- Warren Rupp Observatory
- Rupp Industries, a Mansfield, Ohio producer of go-karts, mini-bikes, and snowmobiles from the late 1950s until 1978; founded by car racer Mickey Rupp

People called Rupp or Ruppe:

- Adolph Rupp (1901–1977), an American basketball coach
  - Adolph Rupp Trophy, an American basketball trophy
  - Rupp Arena, an American basketball arena
- Bernd Rupp (b. 1942), a German football player
- Cameron Rupp (b. 1988), an American baseball player
- Debra Jo Rupp (b. 1951), an American television actress
- Duane Rupp (b. 1938), a Canadian ice hockey player
- Ernest Gordon Rupp (1910–1986), a British preacher and historian
- Ernst Rupp (1892–1943) Wehrmacht General
- Galen Rupp (b. 1986), an American athlete
- George Erik Rupp (b. 1942), an American educator and theologian
- Hans Georg Rupp (1907–1989), German judge
- Heinrich Bernhard Rupp (1688–1719), a German botanist
- Herman Rupp (1872–1956), an Australian clergyman and botanist
- James H. Rupp (1918–1998), an American politician and businessman
- Jean Rupp (1905–1983), French bishop and Vatican diplomat
- Jennifer Rupp (b. 1980), materials engineer
- Kerry Rupp, an American basketball coach
- Leila J. Rupp (b. 1950), an American historian and feminist
- Loret Miller Ruppe (1936–1996), an American administrator and diplomat
- Lukas Rupp (born 1991), German footballer
- Michael Rupp (b. 1980), an American ice hockey player
- Mickey Rupp (b. 1936), an American racecar driver
- Pat Rupp (1942–2006), an American ice hockey player
- Philip Ruppe (1926–2026), an American politician
- Rainer Rupp (b. 1945), East German spy
- Roman Rupp (born 1964), Austrian alpine skier
- Ruben Rupp (born 1990), German politician
- Scott T. Rupp, an American politician
- Sieghardt Rupp (1931–2015), an Austrian actor
- Terry Rupp (born 1966), an American college baseball coach
