= Danfoss =

Danish multinational company

Danfoss A/S
- Type: Private
- Industry: Fluid control equipment, pump, seal, valve manufacturing, climate & energy
- Founded: 1933; 93 years ago
- Headquarters: Nordborg, Denmark
- Key people: Kim Fausing, CEO; Jørgen M. Clausen
- Products: Refrigeration, air conditioning, motor controllers, building heating solutions and solutions for renewable energy (solar power and heat pumps)
- Number of employees: 41,928 (2023)
- Website: Danfoss.com

Danfoss is a Danish multinational company, based in Denmark, with more than 41,928 employees globally. Danfoss was founded in 1933 by engineer Mads Clausen.

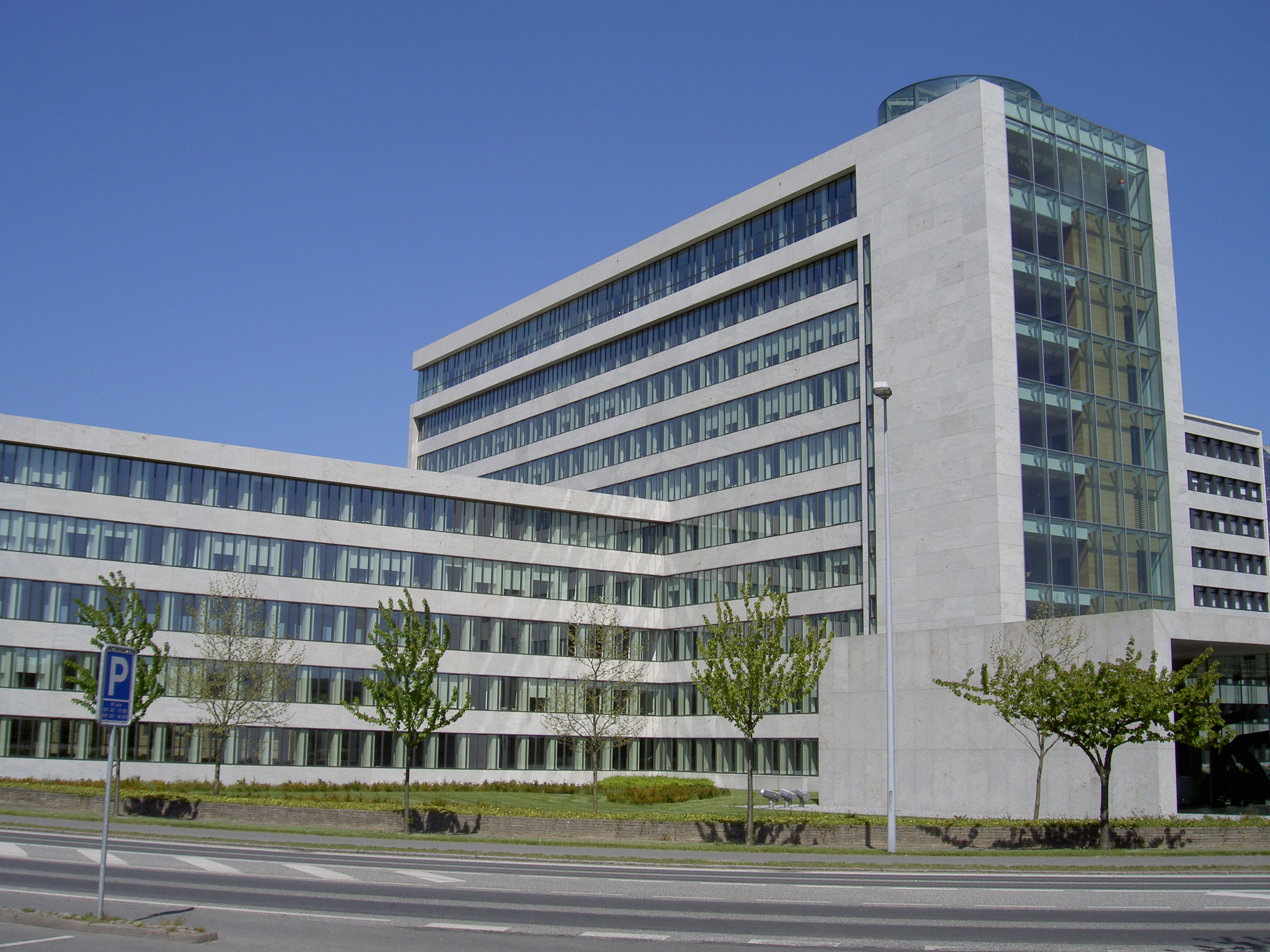
Danfoss headquarters in Nordborg, Denmark

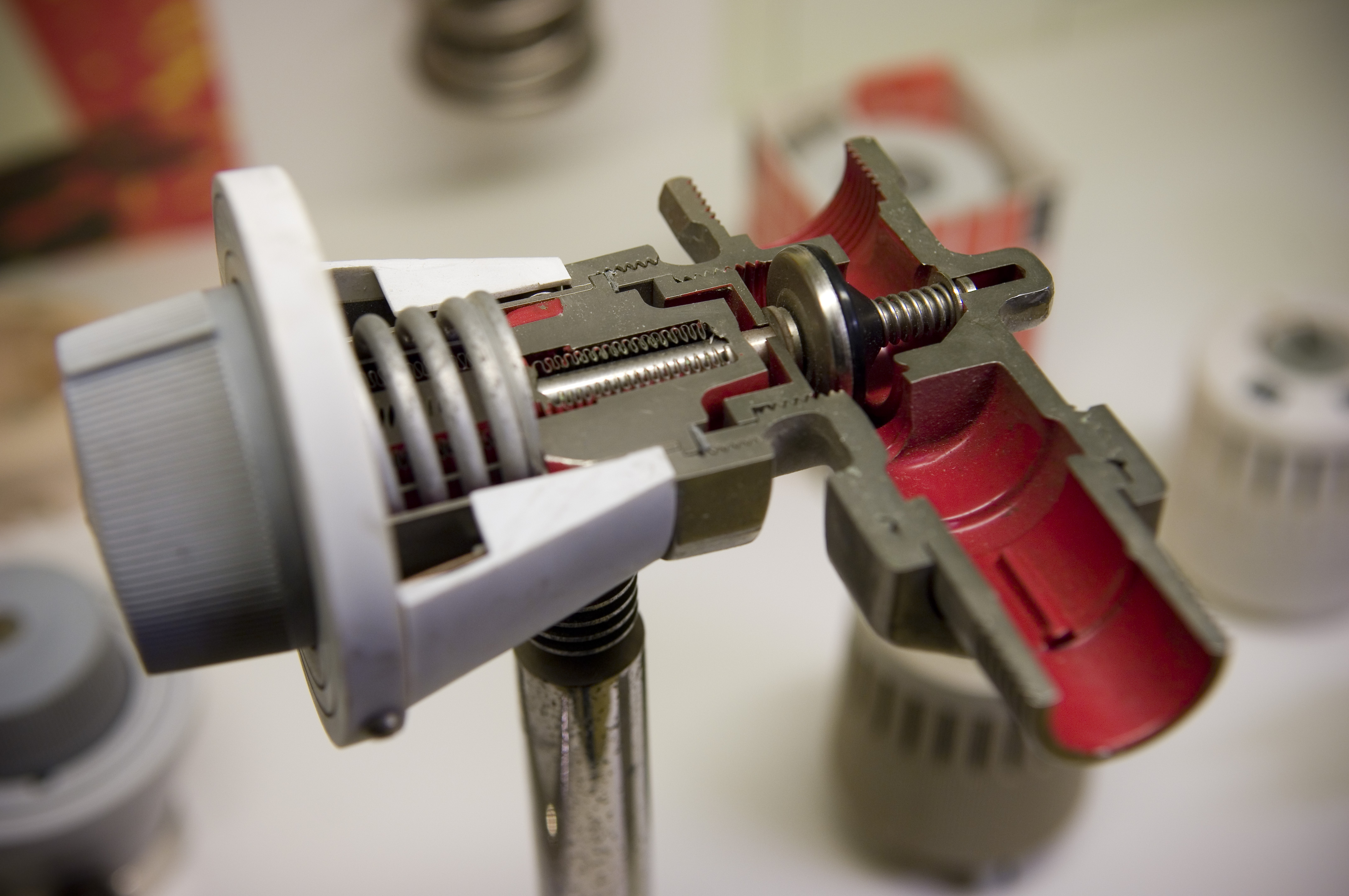
Cutaway model of Danfoss's first automatic valve

== History ==
=== Beginning (1933–1966) ===
In 1933 Mads Clausen (1905–1966) founded Dansk Køleautomatik- og Apparatfabrik, later in 1946 the company name was changed to Danfoss. The first product was an expansion valve for refrigeration units, it was developed after studying imported valves from the US.

In 1941, activities expanded to products for heating. The thermostatic radiator valve was invented by Mads Clausen in 1943, later patented, and in 1952 promoted as an energy saving device.

In 1945 about 224 people were employed at the first factory built at and around the farm where he grew up. There was no more room for expansion and a new larger factory was planned.

In 1962 the company started production of power electronics, the first product was custom-built rectifiers, later in 1968 production of the VLT Frequency converter began, the first of its kind in the world.
The company also expanded its activities into hydraulics, the first hydraulic component was produced in the factory in Nordborg in 1964.

Mads Clausen died in 1966, at 60. Because his sons were too young to run the company, his widow Bitten Clausen took on the role as head of the board. The company had yearly sales of 500 million Danish kroner, and the factory had grown to 10,000 m^{2}.

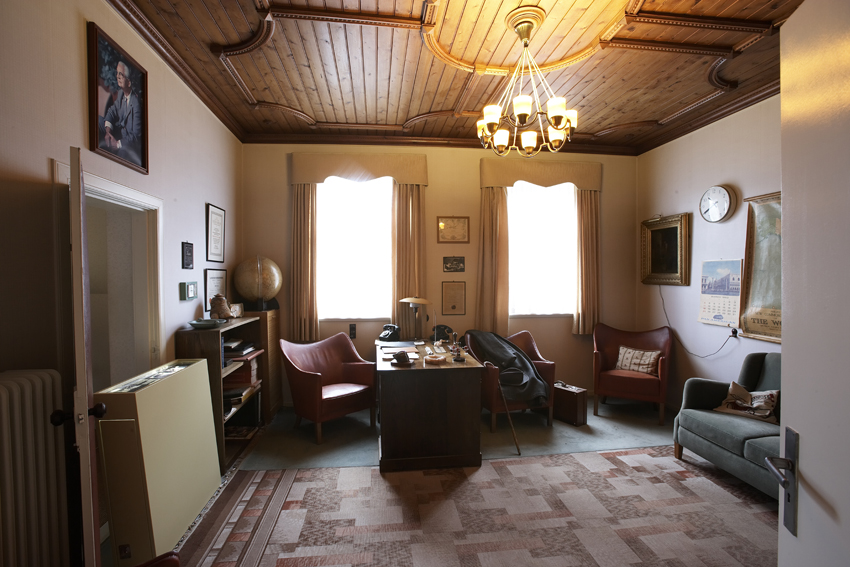
The office of Mads Clausen as he left it in 1962

=== Since 1966 ===
Expansion into other countries started in 1956, when the company started to build a factory in Flensburg, Germany, which was completed in 1958.

Danfoss Compressors GmbH, Danfoss' former domestic compressor division, was sold in 2010 and renamed Secop.

China is also an important market for Danfoss. In 2013, two new factories were opened on the same day, bringing the number to seven. The Chinese market was the third largest for the company.

In 2014, Danfoss purchased Vacon, a VFD manufacturer.

In December 2025, it was announced that Danfoss, through its Power Solutions division, had completed the acquisition of Hydro Holding SpA, a manufacturer of hose fittings based in Italy. The acquisition, which followed regulatory approval, resulted in Hydro Holding being integrated into Danfoss Power Solutions' fluid conveyance division as a separate business unit.

In October 2026, Danfoss refrigeration controllers in French supermarkets were hacked, causing tens of millions of euros in losses due to spoiled food.

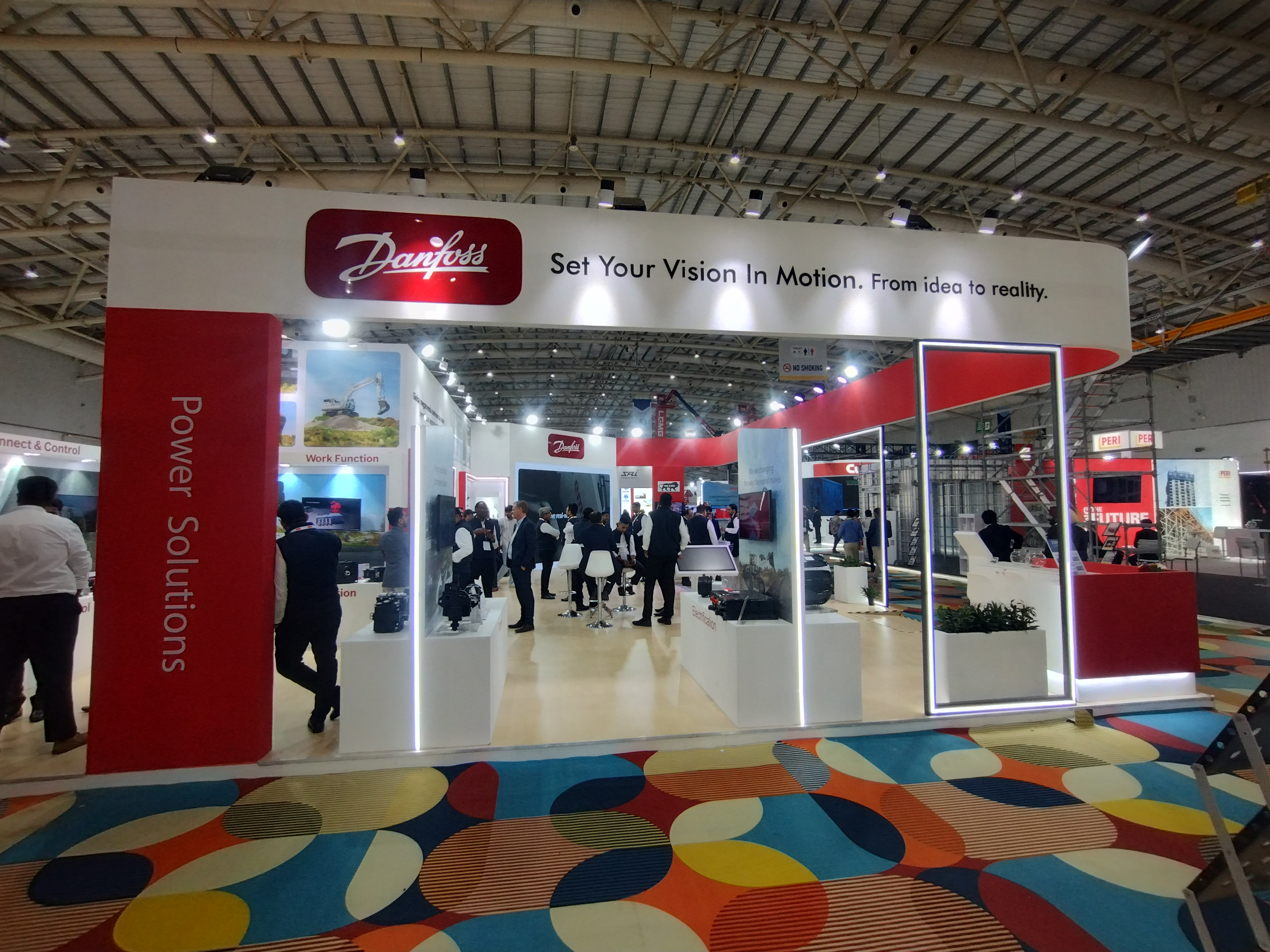
Danfoss at EXCON 2025, BIEC

== Activities ==
The Danfoss Group manufactures products and provides services used in:

- cooling food
- air conditioning
- heating buildings
- variable-frequency drives
- gas compressors
- powering mobile machinery.

Danfoss employs approximately 41,928 people worldwide with its headquarters in Nordborg, Denmark.
In 2002 Danfoss joined the United Nations Global Compact, consisting of nine principles with social and environmental responsibility.

Bitten og Mads Clausens Fond was established as a self-governing institution in 1971 by Bitten Clausen. Today, the foundation is the biggest shareholder in the company.

== Controversy ==
=== World War II ===
In 2010, some Danish newspapers reported that Danfoss sold its products to Germany during World War II. They quoted the book Krigens købmænd ("Merchants of War") by Christian Jensen, Tomas Kristiansen and Karl Erik Nielsen, who stated that Danfoss sold goods to the occupying forces for 408,850 Danish kroner. According to Ole Daugbjerg from Danfoss, they did not trade directly with the Germans.

Later in 2001, it was cleared in the book Danfoss under besættelsen ("Danfoss during the Occupation") by Ditlev Tamm although other critics have claimed the book might not be neutral because Tamm was paid by Danfoss to perform the investigations.

=== Cartel ===
On 7 December 2011 Danfoss was fined 90 million euro for exercising a cartel with Embraco / Whirlpool Corporation, Panasonic, ACC and Tecumseh Products. The cooperation was entered with compressors from April 2004 to October 2007. The basis of the fine is the violation of free competition to the detriment of consumers.

Danfoss was fined 16.5 million Danish kroner in the United States. From October 2004 to 2007, the German subsidiary also entered illegal price agreements with competitors. The case in both the European Commission and the US is related.

== See also ==
- Bock GmbH
