= Secop =

German company producing compressors for cooling appliances

Secop GmbH
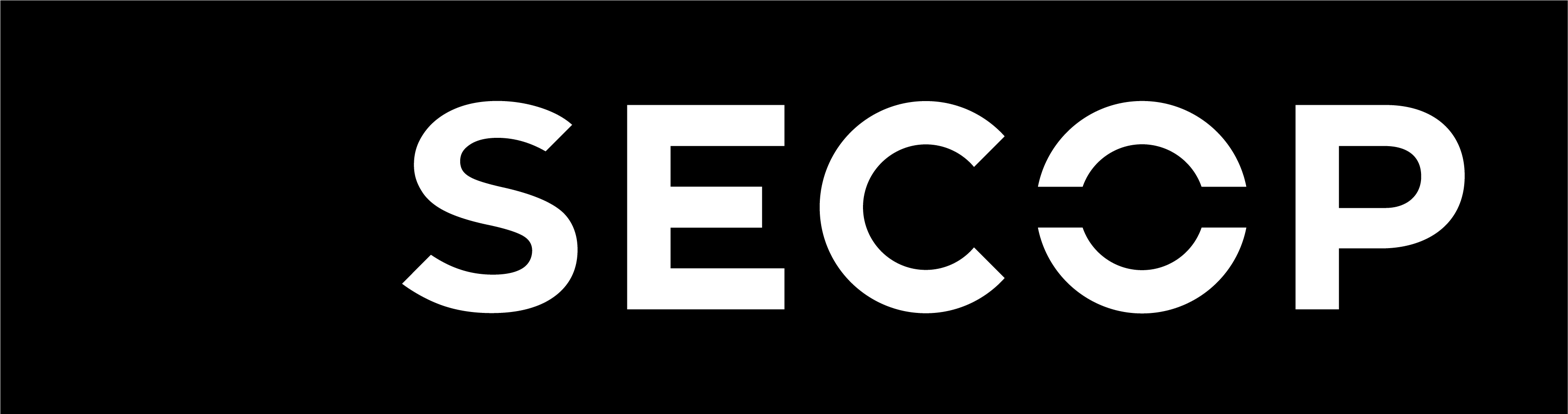
- Type: GmbH (Private company)
- Industry: Refrigeration and cooling compressors
- Founded: November 2010
- Headquarters: Flensburg, Deutschland
- Key people: CEO: Dr. Jan Ehlers
- Owner: ESSVP IV, advised by Orlando Management AG
- Number of employees: approx. 31 (Germany), approx. 1,350 worldwide
- Website: www.secop.com

Secop GmbH (formerly known as Danfoss Compressors GmbH) is a manufacturer of hermetic compressors for cooling circuits. Secop designs, develops, manufactures and distributes compressors for two application ranges: light commercial refrigeration systems and cooling solutions for the mobile area (12/24/48 volt DC compressors). According to the manufacturer, the compressors are characterized by low energy consumption, low noise emission and environmental friendliness due to the use of CFC-free refrigerants.

The headquarters of Secop are located in Flensburg/Germany, where approximately 70 employees (as of November 2023) work in research and development, the sales division and the product support department. Secop also operates production facilities in Slovakia and in the People's Republic of China, a research center in Austria and worldwide sales and customer service companies.

On April 25, 2017, Japanese company Nidec has signed an agreement to acquire Secop. On September 9, 2019, Secop was acquired by the ESSVP IV fund, advised by Orlando Management AG, and became a stand alone company again.

== History ==
Under the name of Danfoss Compressors GmbH (temporarily Danfoss Household Compressors GmbH), the current company Secop was part of the Danfoss Refrigeration & Air Conditioning Division of Danfoss A/S until 2010. The group headquarters are located in Nordborg/Denmark.

On 29 November 2010, the Danfoss Group concluded the formal and legally binding separation from this segment of its compressor program. Danfoss Compressors GmbH was taken over by the Munich industrial holding company Aurelius AG. As a close partner of the Danfoss Group, Secop still continues to market its compressor-solutions via the Danfoss Sales Network.

The companies did not disclose the value of the transaction. According to estimates made by the media, the deal was relatively small for Danfoss: Danfoss is one of Denmark's largest industrial companies with an annual turnover of more than 3.4 billion euros (at the time of the transaction) and 26,000 employees worldwide. For Aurelius (turnover 2009: 760 million euros) the takeover was regarded as a major growth step. Dirk Markus, CEO of Aurelius, stated: "We are delighted that the Danfoss Group (...) decided to sell another subsidiary to Aurelius."

The acquisition by Aurelius contained the complete operations in Germany, China, Slovenia and Slovakia with a total of approximately 3,000 employees. As part of the acquisition Danfoss Compressors was renamed and then conducted its business under the name Secop. Secop GmbH is a newly formed company but also has a history of more than 60 years.

== Times of crisis ==
Even before the takeover by Aurelius, measures were taken to counteract financial crises and to counteract the decline in sales. In 2005 Danfoss already issued a press release in which years of loss-making production of household compressors were criticized and the plan to cut the workforce in half was announced. In 2009 Danfoss Board member Kim Fausing reported weekly losses of millions of euros due to sales declines. Between 2005 and 2010 the staff in Flensburg was cut down from 1,450 to 200. The compressor production was relocated to Slovakia and China in 2010. As mentioned above, only the research and development department, the sales division and the product support remain in Flensburg.

Under Aurelius, the order situation worsened again in July and August 2011. Mogens Søholm, Chief Executive Officer of Secop, informed the public that 20% less compressors had been sold in these months. The introduction of short-time work was the consequence. Søholm explained that this should help spanning the time until the conversion increased again. It was agreed upon that the short-time work was supposed to end in September 2012. After one month of short-time work, in November 2011, a social plan that had been negotiated in 2008 was terminated by years end. Mogens Søholm justified the termination of this plan by saying that the agreement had been made for the Danfoss production staff in 2008 and thus was a contract from another time. The situation lead to uncertainty in the workforce and indignation on the part of the works council and the union.

At the beginning of 2012 Secop announced further layoffs. The approximately 180-strong workforce was again decimated by around 60 people. The employees protested.

== Recent History ==
On the China Refrigeration Exhibition in April 2013 in Shanghai, 1,146 manufacturers presented their compressors, refrigeration and air conditioning systems. Secop presented the X Series for R600a. The XV received an Innovation Award for its compactness and low weight. Secop itself stated: "Based on a completely new and innovative platform, the XV variable capacity compressor ensures up to 40 % efficiency compared to the highest efficient standard compressors, sets new low noise standards with 32 dB(A), increases useable volume by the revolutionary low height of 100 mm and reduces costs and raw material consumption with its extremely low weight of 4.8 kg."

In April 2013 Secop took over the insolvent company ACC Austria GmbH in Fürstenfeld/Austria for more than 25 million euros. In the course of the bankruptcy of the Italian mother company and a German subsidiary in late 2012, the Austrian compressor manufacturer had been forced to file for bankruptcy as well. In 2012, ACC had accomplished a turnover of approximately 150 million euros. With ca. 700 employees, the company was the largest employer in its home region. Secop declared it wanted to sustain the location as far as possible. At present, ACC employs 500 staffers.

As part of the regulatory approval process, the referral to the European Commission had been completed in September 2013. The acquisition of ACC Austria GmbH by Secop was approved on 11 December 2013.

On August 1, 2017 the whole Secop group was sold by Aurelius and bought by the Japanese stock corporation Nidec for the price of 185 million euros. On August 16, 2018 the name was changed to Nidec Global Appliance Germany GmbH. On June 4, 2019 antitrust concerns about additional acquisitions by the Nidec Corporation in the refrigeration compressor industry led the company to sell off Secop which transitioned to ESSVP IV in September 2019 managed by Orlando Management AG. The transaction was officially completed on September 10, 2019 and from this date forward Secop acted as an independent company again.

At the end of October 2019, it was announced that the Fürstenfeld plant would be closed by March 2020. Production was relocated to China and Slovakia, and 250 employees were laid off. In early April 2020, it was reported that 170 of 300 jobs at the Fürstenfeld site were secured. This was said to be made possible by the sale of Secop's Delta production line to Nidec. There is to be a social plan for the remaining employees. Some were also contracted to work at the new Secop site in Gleisdorf, where Secop opened a new R&D center with 45 jobs in October 2020.

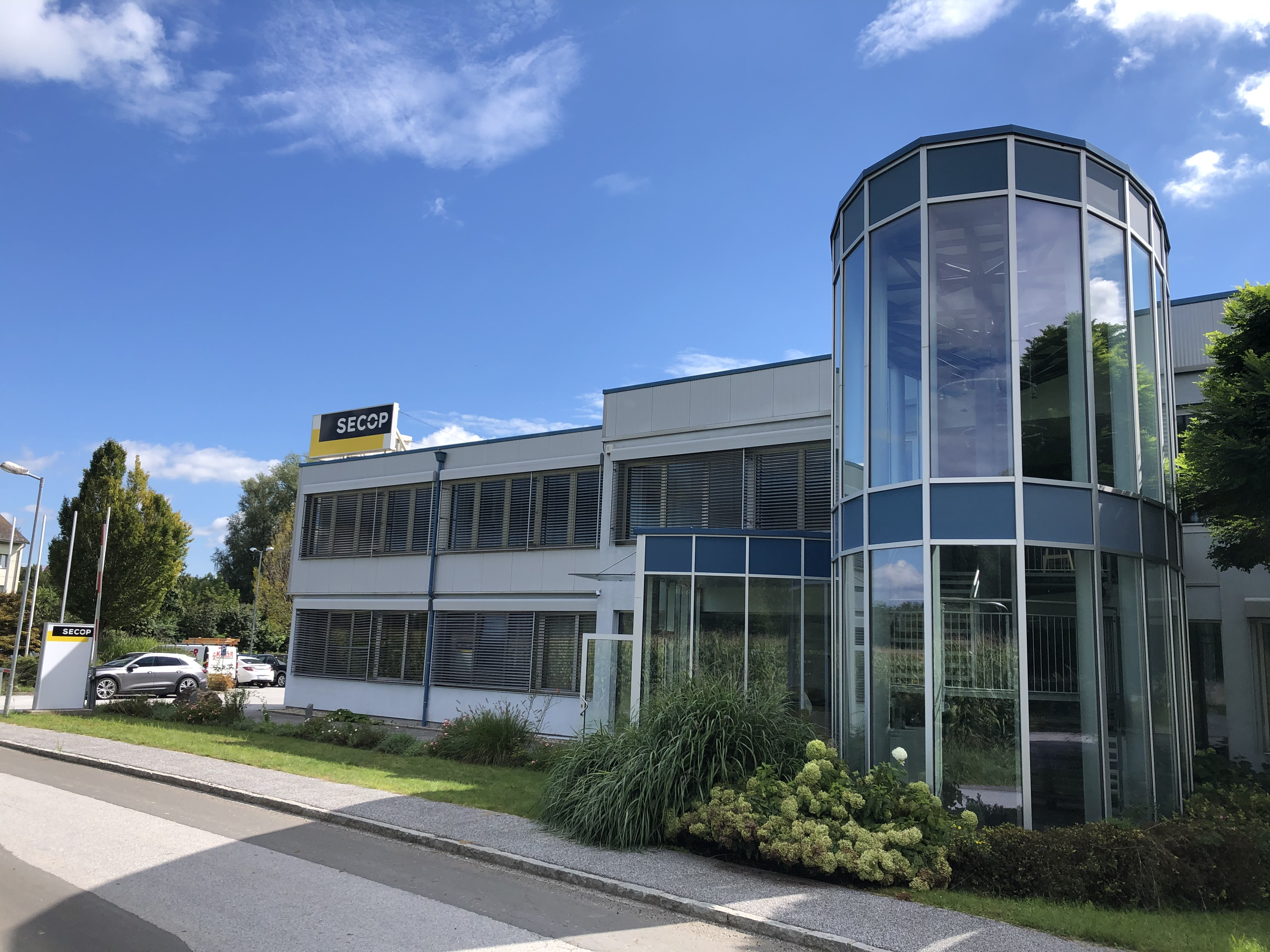
The Secop R&D center in Gleisdorf Austria was opened in 2020.

In November 2020, Secop celebrated the 10th anniversary of the brand - although the company's history as part of the Danfoss company goes back much further.

According to the company, it underwent heavy restructuring in the year 2020 to make Secop more future-proof. For example, Secop now focuses on three main business areas – Light Commercial, Mobile Cooling and Medical Cooling. Secop's days as a manufacturer of compressors for the household sector had come to an end with the sale of the Delta production line and the closure of the Fürstenfeld site.

== Present ==
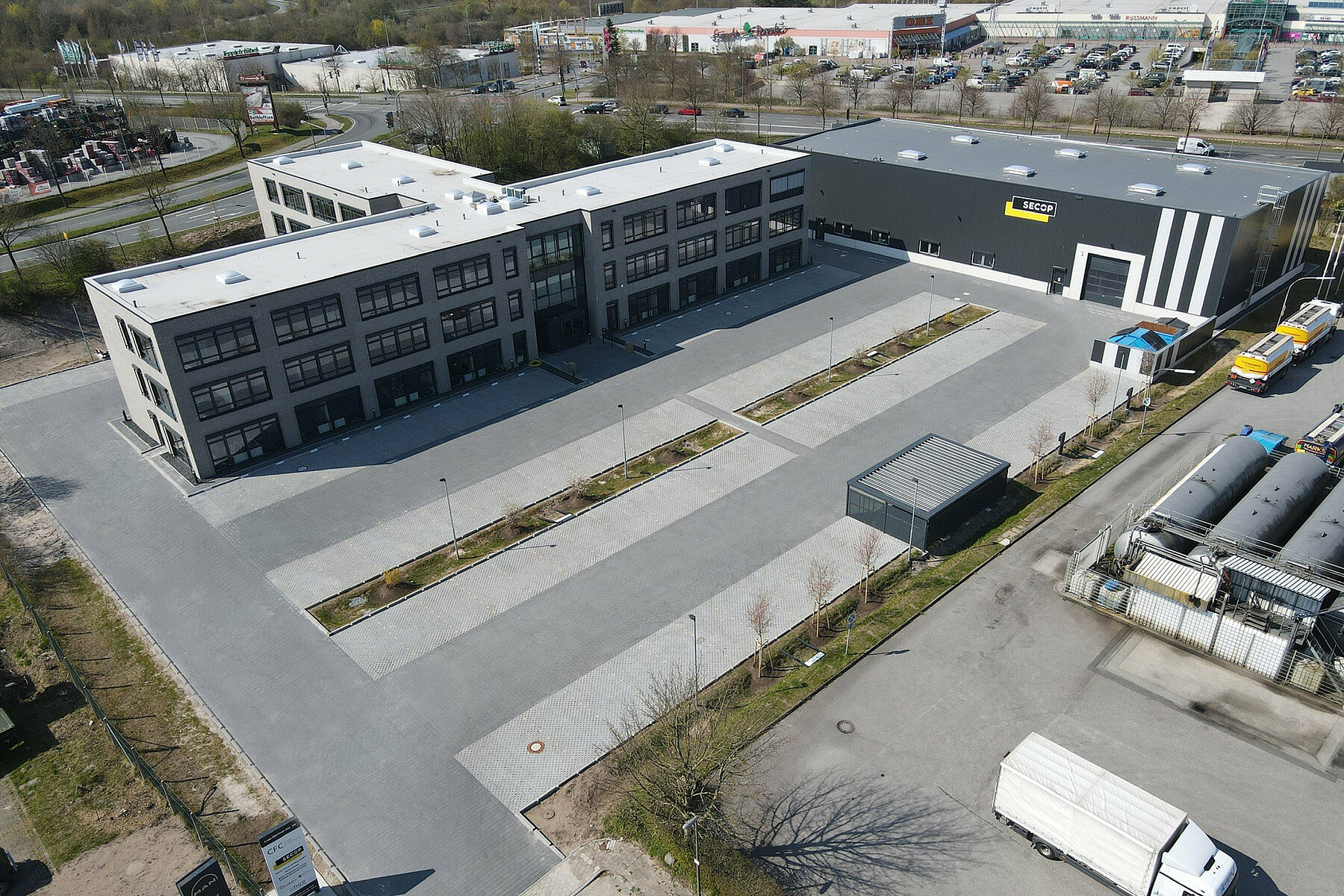
The new Secop HQ build in 2021 in Flensburg.

In 2021, Secop built a new main building in Flensburg at Lise-Meitner-Straße 21. All departments, which were previously spread across several locations, were brought together under one roof.

In 2023, Secop was recognised as a Top 100 Innovator. The decisive factor for this was the development of the BD-Nano, a very compact hermetic compressor that made it possible to cool vaccines on transport routes during the coronavirus crisis.

The company's 4-member management team consists of:

- Dr Jan Ehlers, Chief Executive Officer
- Johannes Maerz, Chief Operation Officer
- Michael Engelen, Chief Financial Officer
- Norbert Brath, Chief Technology Officer

== Locations and subsidiaries ==
Company name	Address	Country	Employees (approx.)
Secop GmbH	Lise-Meitner-Straße 21, 24941 Flensburg	Germany	70
Secop Compressors (Tianjin) Co., Ltd.	Wuqing Development Zone, No. 27, Kai Yuan Road, 301700 Tianjin	China	600
Secop s.r.o.	Továrenská 49, 953 01 Zlaté Moravce	Slovakia	700
Secop Austria GmbH	Mühlwaldstraße 21, 8200 Gleisdorf	Austria	50

Note

The figures given in the context of layoffs refer to announced job cuts. The layoffs actually made are not explicitly traceable. Staff numbers are adventitiously the result of reinstatements, termination requested by the employee, pension entrances etc.
