= Thomas Clausen =

Thomas Clausen may refer to:

- Thomas Clausen (educator) (1939–2002), educator from Baton Rouge, Louisiana
- Thomas Clausen (musician) (born 1949), Danish jazz pianist
- Thomas Clausen (mathematician) (1801–1885), Danish mathematician and astronomer

== See also ==
- Clausen
