= Klausen =

Klausen may refer to:

- Klausen, Germany, an Ortsgemeinde in Rhineland-Palatinate
- Klausen, South Tyrol, a municipality in Italy
- Klausen Pass, Switzerland
- Klausen (surname)
