= Charlotte Sahl-Madsen =

Danish politician

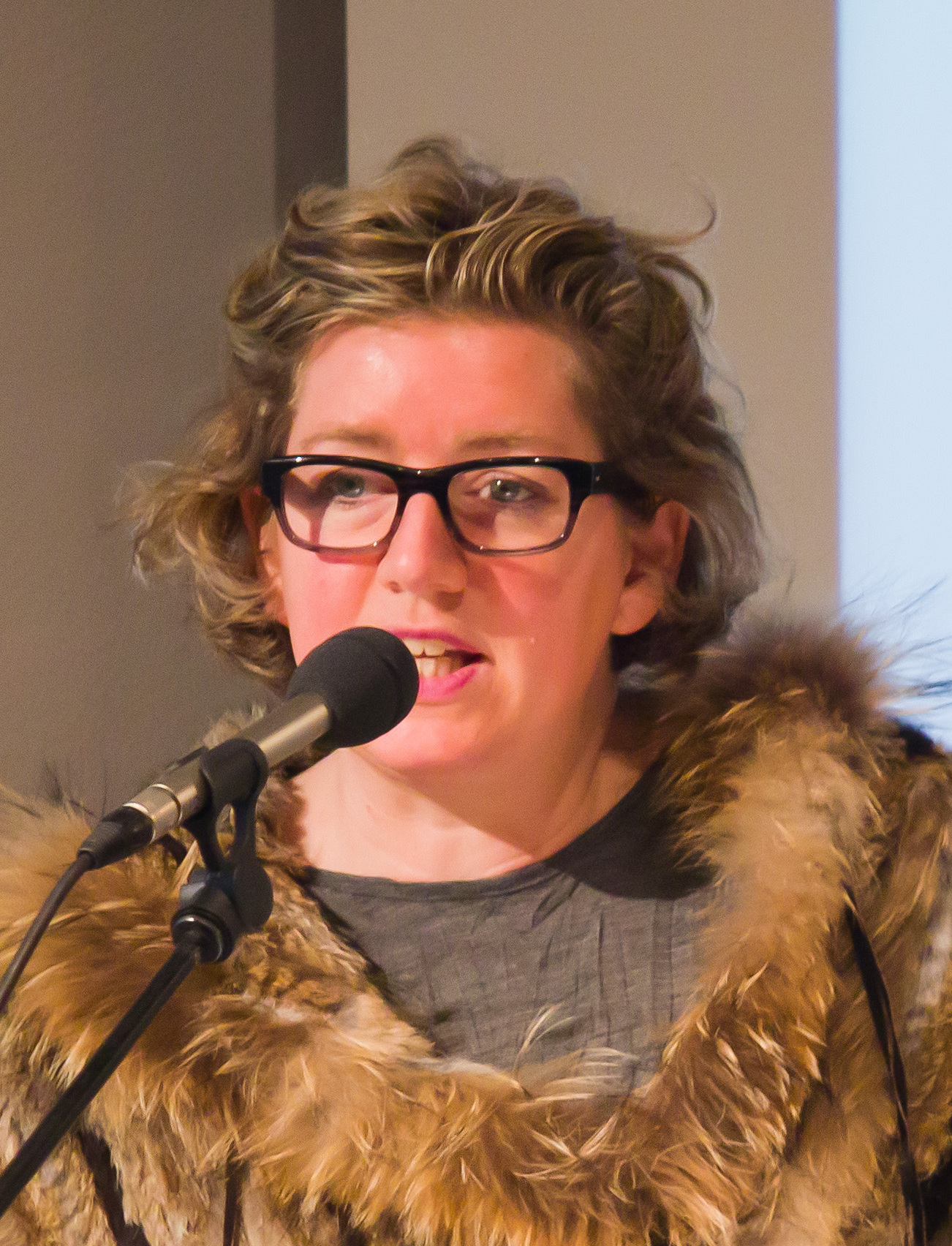
- Sahl-Madsen in November 2010
- Born: 26 August 1964 (age 61); Holstebro, Denmark
- Occupations: Politician, businesswoman

Charlotte Sahl-Madsen or Sahl-Madsen (born 26 August 1964) is a Danish politician and businesswoman. She was the Danish Minister of Science, Technology and Development from 23 February 2010 to 3 October 2011. She had previously led Ebeltoft Glass Museum, Lego R&D and the Universe theme park.

== Early life ==
Sahl-Madsen was born in Holstebro in 1964. One of her parents was a hatter and the other was a self-employed business person. She was educated at Holstebro Gymnasium until 1983. She attended the University of Aarhus in 1985 but did not graduate. Her highest academic qualification came from her high school. Her first notable job was as director of the Ebeltoft Glass Museum.

== Business career ==
Sahl-Madsen was CEO of Danfoss Universe and a director of Lego. She joined the Economic and Business Affairs experts and director of the Danish Ministry's innovation unit. She describes how the CEO of Lego, Jørgen Vig Knudstorp, came to visit the Ebeltoft Glass Museum and she thought he had come to discuss a potential grant. Instead, however, she was offered the chance to lead their R&D department. She says that if people place trust in you then you need to return the compliment by justifying their trust. She was offered the job of leading what was then called Danfoss Universe. The theme park is now called "Universe" and it is a theme park that is focussed on interesting people in Science. Whilst she was at the theme park she worked with the developmental psychologist Howard Gardner to create experiences that appealed to his theory of multiple intelligences.

== Politics ==
She was a surprise choice as the Conservative Minister of Science, Technology and Development as she was not a member of the Danish Conservative People's Party. She did not know she was to be the new minister the day before she was given the job. She served from 23 February 2010 to 3 October 2011 as part of Lars Løkke Rasmussen's first Cabinet. Whilst she was in office she was criticised by universities because she capped their funding at a time when they were seeing an increase in student numbers.

Political offices
Preceded by Helge Sander	Minister of Science, Technology and Development; 2010–2011	Succeeded by Morten Østergaard
