= Universe (Danish amusement park) =

Amusement and science park in Denmark

- Previously known as Danfoss Universe
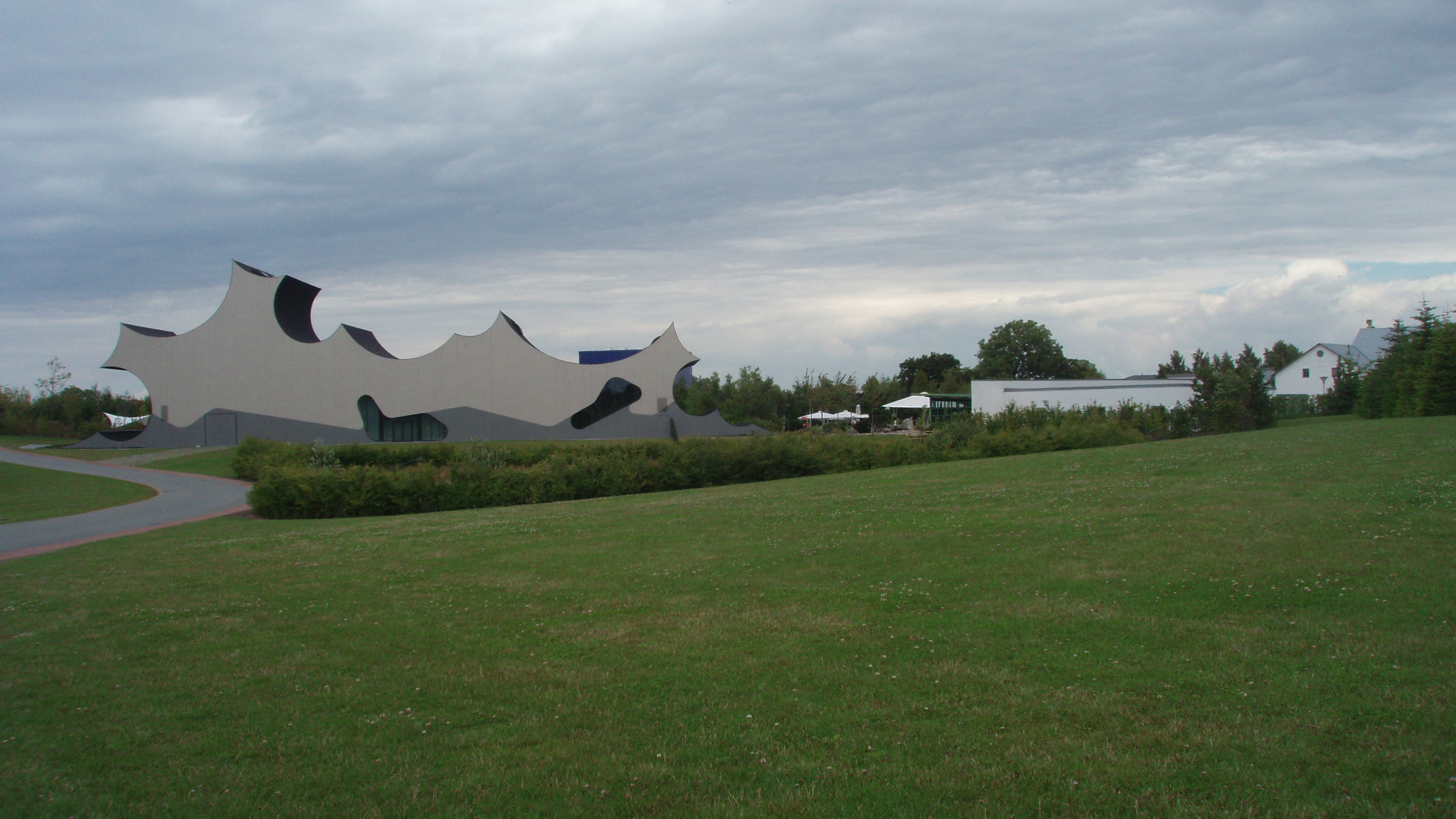
- Universe as seen from Nordborgvej, 2008.
- Interactive map of Universe
- Location: Mads Patent Vej 1, DK-6430 Nordborg, Als, Denmark
- Coordinates: 55.041°N 9.810°E
- Opened: 5 May 2005
- Owner: Fonden Universe Science Park
- General manager: Jonas Juhl Luttermann
- Theme: Science
- Slogan: "The attraction park, where fun is a science"
- Operating season: April – October
- Attendance: 93.000 (2016), 87.920 (2015)
- Website: http://universe.dk

Universe (formerly Danfoss Universe) is a Danish amusement and science park on the island of Als southeast of Jutland. The park's vision is to create amazement around natural science, technology and entrepreneurship. Visitors learn about science through activities, experiences, and acquire knowledge about the world in which it occurs. Universe is noticeably different from other Danish amusement parks in the fact that learning is the linchpin for all the rides, experiences and amusements. The park motto is "The attraction park, where fun is a science".

In 2017 new attractions are a number of virtual reality experiences, SkyTrail climbing tower, electric cars, 5D simulator, astronomy dome and a Chinese garden.

A new feature in 2014 is the outdoor Pixelineland, where you can meet the popular Danish children's games character Pixeline. Here you explore the city, Pixelineland (En:Country of Pixeline)), which offers interactive games with Pixeline's friends, as well as a large playground. Also new in 2014 is the park's Science Circus, where you can experience a good mix of fire, explosions and liquid nitrogen. In addition you can ride Segways, lift a car using you hands, test yourself in the many experiments that are found in Explorama, dig excavations, experience the wild forces of nature in the Blue Cube and lots more. Besides the park, there is also a museum that shows how Danfoss founder Mads Clausen lived and invented Danfoss.

Charlotte Sahl-Madsen who went on to be the Danish Minister of Science, Technology and Development in 2010 was previously head of the theme park. She worked with the developmental psychologist Howard Gardner to build his theory of Multiple Intelligences into the Explorama at the park.

The initial opening of the park on May 5, 2005 was attended by Danish Crown Prince Frederik and Crown Princess Mary.
