= Rupp Industries =

American vehicle manufacturer

Rupp Industries, Inc.
- Type: Private company
- Founded: 1959
- Founder: Mickey Rupp
- Defunct: 1978
- Headquarters: Mansfield, Ohio, U.S.
- Key people: Mickey Rupp, founder, former CEO
- Products: go-karts, snowmobiles, minibikes, dirt bikes
- Number of employees: 400 (1971)

Rupp Industries was a Mansfield, Ohio-based manufacturer of go-karts, minibikes, snowmobiles and other off-road vehicles founded by Mickey Rupp in 1959. Rupp Industries operated from 1959 until bankruptcy in 1978. Rupp vehicles are known for their performance and bright red coloring, particularly the snowmobiles and off-road vehicles.

== History ==
Rupp Industries was born in 1959 when Mickey Rupp began assembling and selling go-karts from his basement. Originally Rupp Manufacturing, the name Rupp Industries was adopted by 1971. In that year Rupp employed 400, with 23 engineers in the R&D department and sales in the millions. In addition to their popular go-karts, Rupp began producing minibikes and snowmobiles in the early 1960s.

Mickey Rupp sold the company in 1973 when it ran into financial trouble. Although the company would continue to produce dirt bikes, minibikes and snowmobiles, they would never regain financial stability and by 1978 went bankrupt.

== Go-karts ==
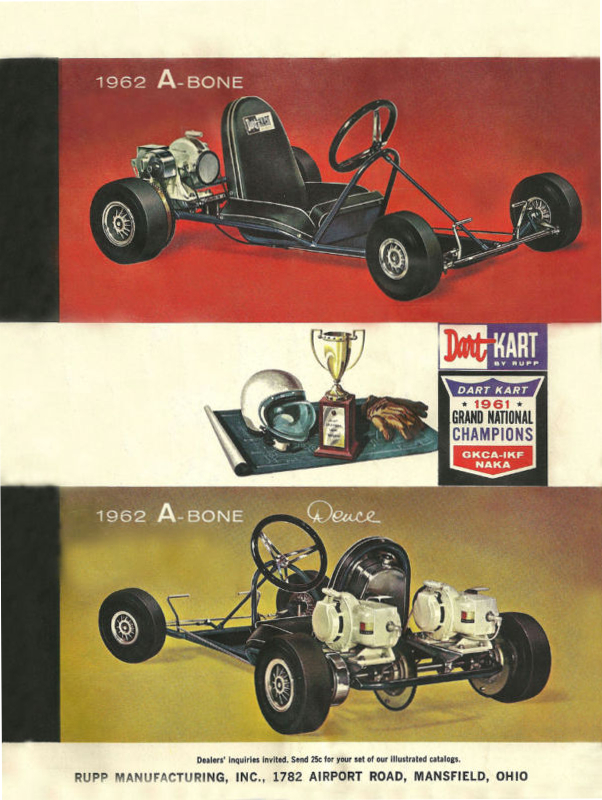
Original ad from 1962

Mickey Rupp began assembling go-karts in his basement in the late 1950s. Rupp made many contributions to the design of go-karts, including the step frame and a new braking system that augmented driver control and kart stopping power. Rupp karts featured single- or dual-engine models with behind-seat-mounted fuel tanks. Rupp would eventually introduce a kart with four-wheel independent suspension.

The first Rupp karts introduced were called Dart Karts. Rupp also produced the A-Bone, A-Bone Deuce (both pictured to the right), Lancer, Monza Jr. and later the J Dart Kart. Rupp manufactured karts as late as 1968. The karts have become highly collectible and have a large following.

== Minibikes ==
Following the success of their go-karts, Rupp manufactured mini bikes from 1962 until the mid-1970s. Models included the Dart Cycle, Continental, Roadster, Scrambler, Hustler, Chopper, Black Widow, Enduro, Roadster 2, Swinger, Sprint, Digger, Goat, Ram, TT-500, XL-500, XL-350 and others. Rupp minibikes were made in a variety of styles with various features, including varying engine sizes, lighting kits and color options. Rupp offered upgrades to their bikes as well, including speedometers, luggage racks, lift bars, horns, mud flaps and crash bars.

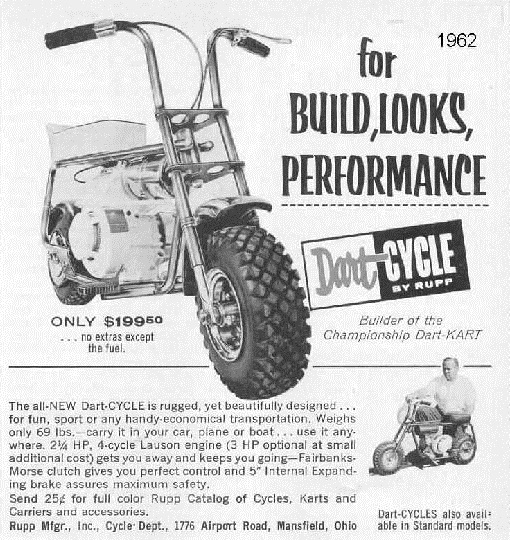
Original ad from 1962

=== 1962 ===
The first Rupp minibikes were called Dart Cycles and were made starting in 1962. They featured a 2 1/2 horsepower, 4-cycle Lauson horizontal-shaft engine with a Fairbanks-Morse clutch (an optional 3 HP was available for an extra charge). The bikes came with front suspension and rear drum brakes. They were advertised in Cycle World and other magazines.

=== 1963 ===
Rupp's minibike offering in 1963 was the Dart Ridge Runner, classified as a trail scooter. It featured a 3 1/2 HP Lauson engine with a belt drive system and dual fuel tanks. A passenger seat was located over the two fuel tanks. It came in one color—high-visibility orange. The Ridge Runner was positively reviewed in Cycle World magazine's "Trail Test" in 1963.

=== 1964–1967 ===
Rupp introduced their next line of minibikes in 1964 called the Continental. The 1964 Continental was rolled out with a 3 1/2 HP, 4-cycle Lauson engine as well as front and rear suspension. For the first time in 1964 Rupp also outfitted the bikes with a head and tail light. A chrome chain guard and chrome fenders were added features of the Continental. The Continentals had many models of their own, including the Electra, Custom, Special and Cub. All bikes were outfitted with 6" wheels. Late 1965 saw the Tecumseh 3 1/2 HP on the Continentals as well.

=== 1968 ===
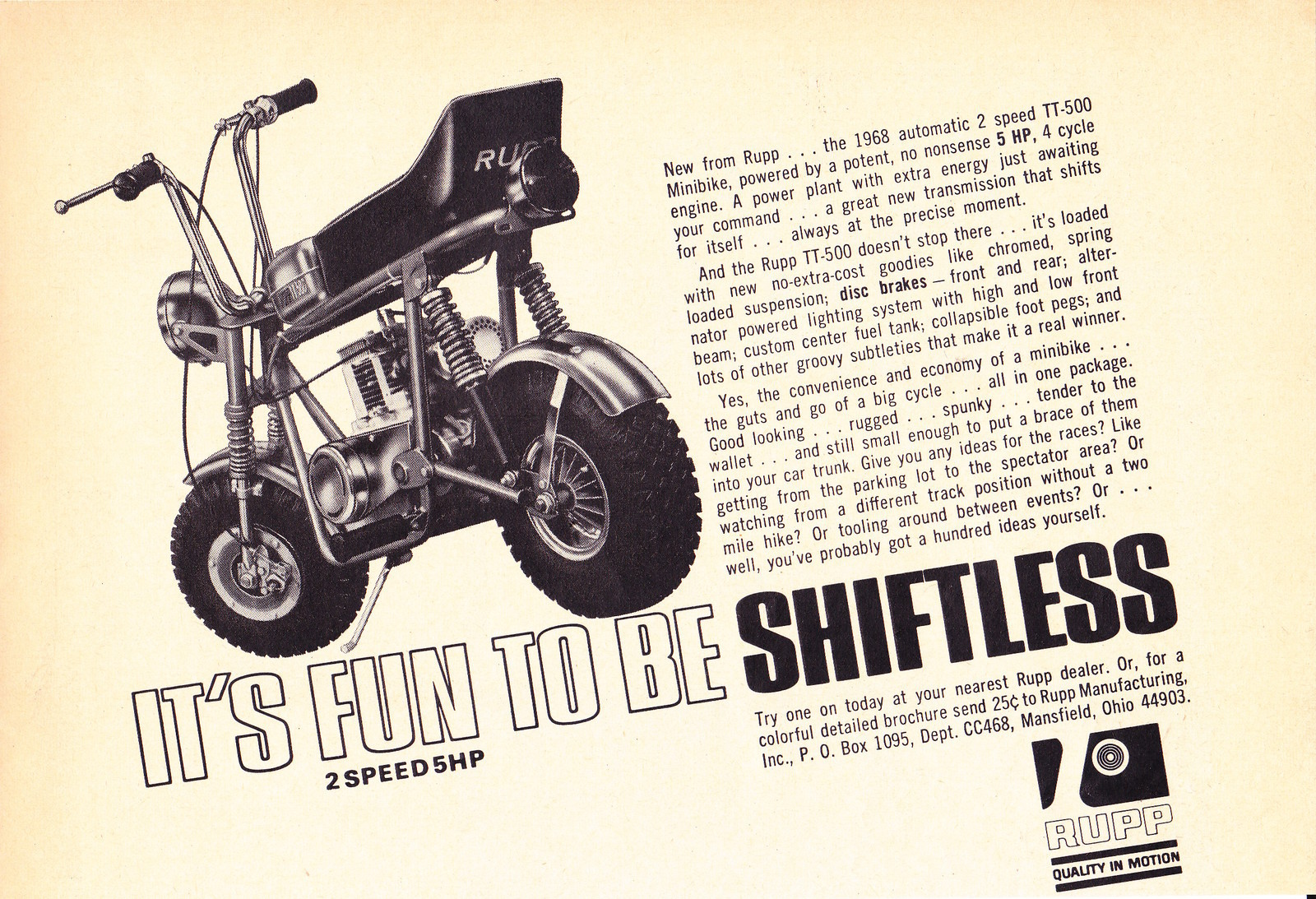
Promotional ad for the new 1968 Rupp TT-500. The first Rupp to feature disc brakes

The year 1968 marked a first for Rupp minibikes in many ways, including the first and only year that the minibikes were made with disc brakes as well as the introduction of Tecumseh engines, which Rupp would use until the discontinuation of their minibikes. Rupp made significant changes to their Continental lineup and added the XL and TT models. In 1968 all Rupp bikes were available in metallic red, metallic blue or metallic gold and still featured the 6" wheels.

Some changes were made to the Continentals in 1968, including replacing the Lauson engine with a Tecumseh. Models were also designated with a C followed by a numeric based on the engine size. Three models of Continentals were offered in 1968 including the C-350, C-250 and C-220 Cub. The C-350 was outfitted with a 3 1/2 HP Tecumseh engine as well as a rear disc brake. The C-250 came with a 2 1/2 HP Tecumseh engine and also had a rear disc brake. The C-220, or Cub was an economy model which featured a different (not chrome) chain guard, as well as a scrub type brake, smaller seat and different fuel tank. The Cub could be purchased not assembled at a discount. 1968 marked the last year Rupp would make the Continental series of mini bikes.

The new models were the XL-350, XL-500 and TT-500. All of these newer models featured front and rear disc brakes, headlight/taillights, chrome chain guards and automatic clutches with jackshafts. Also new to these bikes were external spring shocks, front and rear, and noncontinuous forks and handlebars. The TT-500 was the top of the line newer model and featured a different chain guard as well as a two speed jackshaft. The XL-350 and XL-500 were identical, both featuring a single speed jackshaft, with the exception of the engine size—3 1/2 and 5 HP, respectively. Rupp also offered accessories for the bikes at an extra charge, including a front bicycle basket, windshield and crash bar.

=== 1969 ===
In 1969 Rupp revamped their lineup with a totally new minibike offering and discontinued every bike from 1968. They also discontinued the disc brakes and replaced them with drum brakes. Rupp also introduced their first exhaust pipes to their bikes.

- Roadster – The Roadster was the new top-of-the-line bike, and was one of two models, along with the Scrambler to have a new style rectangular headlight and rear tail/brake lights. It came with a Tecumseh H50 engine and a two speed jackshaft. The Roadster was available in red, green, yellow and orange.
- Goat – The Rupp Goat (also known as the Ram) featured the same specifications as the Roadster minus the lights. Same colors offered as the Roadster.
- Scrambler – Similar to the Roadster, the Scrambler featured a front headlight and rear tail/brake lights, however it came with a 3.5 HP Tecumseh engine and single speed jackshaft. Same colors offered as the Roadster and Goat/Ram.

Rupp also offered a variety of economy models with frames similar to that of the Continentals with one piece fork/handlebars. These had differing engine sizes ranging from 2 1/2 HP to 5 HP. Some bikes came with front and/or rear suspension, others did not. The models included the Digger, Banchi, Sprint and Chopper.

=== 1970 ===
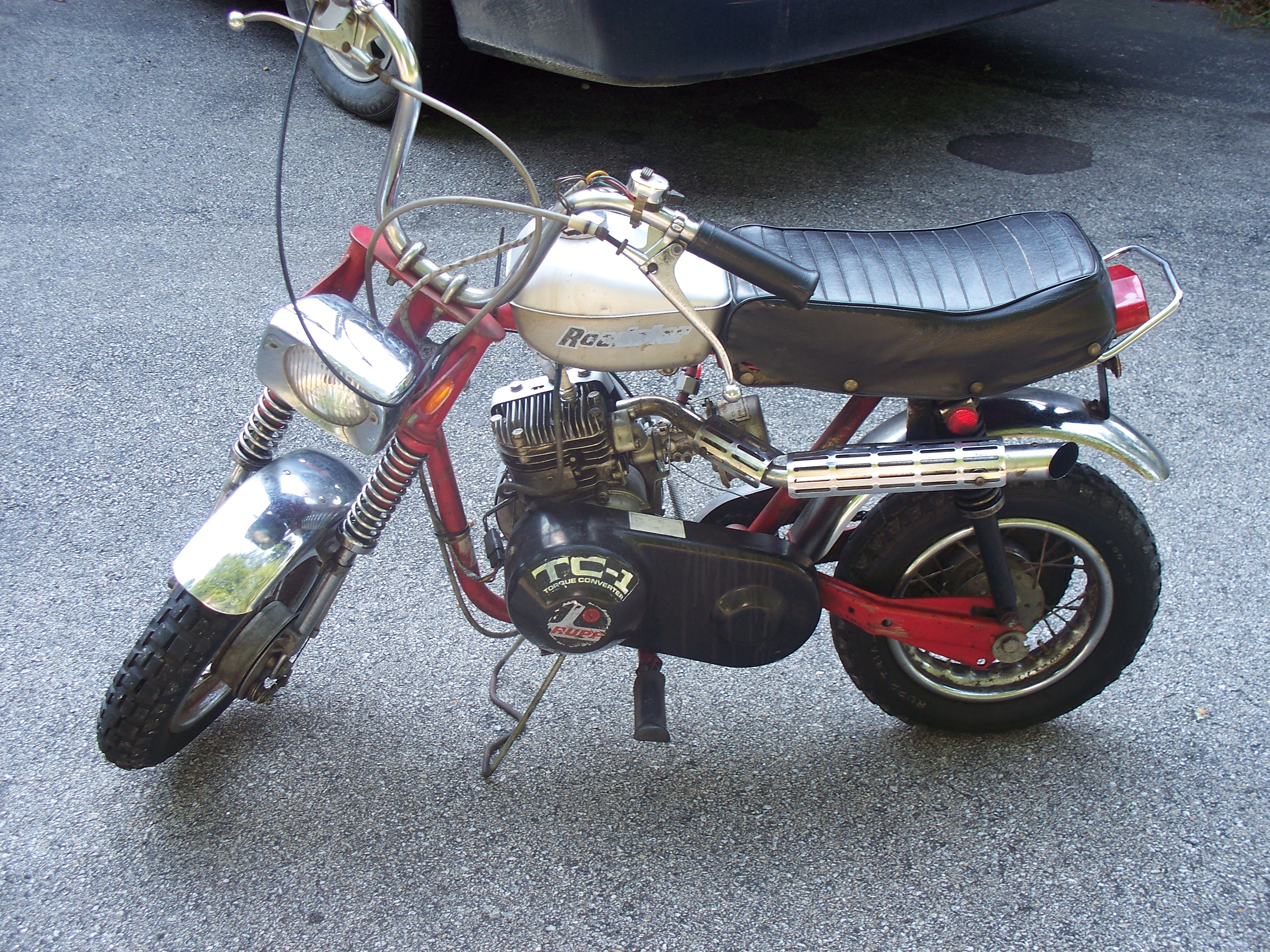
Original Rupp Roadster, fitted with optional rear grab bar

Rupp's greatest change to their mini bike lineup in any year was arguably 1970. The frame was entirely redesigned, changing from a dual loop frame to a single loop frame, and spoke-type wheels were introduced. The Roadster and Scrambler's 6" wheels were augmented to 10" spoke wheels and a new model, the Enduro was manufactured. These 10" wheel bikes were outfitted with 4HP Tecumseh HS40 engines with a diaphragm carburetor and for the first time Rupp used a slanted engine plate, which tended to keep the torque converter belt tight as well as changing the "look" of the bike to more closely resemble a motorcycle. Many features of the bikes were changed including the gas tank, seat (notably manner of attachment), handlebars, exhaust pipe, taillight, chain guard, decals, new motorcycle style center kickstand, among others.

Notably, in 1970 Rupp introduced their TC-1 torque converter to some bikes that they would use on their higher priced models through 1976. The TC-1 unit used a weighted clutch on the engine shaft with a belt drive to two sheaves on the jackshaft. The unit then ran a chain drive back to the rear wheel.

A few economy models remained, including the Sprint which utilized the 1970 style frame but with the older 6" turbine style wheels and the Chopper.

Major changes to the lineup in 1970: Rupp sold five models in 1970, the Roadster, Enduro, Scrambler, Sprint and Chopper.

- Roadster – Many changes were made to the Roadster in 1970. It now used the new Rupp frame with the slanted engine plate and diaphragm carburetor. The wheels were upgraded from the 6" turbine style to a new 10" chrome wire wheel. The engine size was decreased from the 5 HP Tecumseh H50 to a 4 HP Tecumseh HS40. The engine had a lighting coil and still ran lights front and rear. The Roadster had front and rear drum brakes. Rupp marketed the Roadster as street legal. The Roadster, Enduro and Scrambler were available in blue, orange or red. All had silver gas tanks and silver engines.
- Scrambler – The Scrambler underwent some changes as well. It also was upgraded to 10" wire wheels. The engine remained a 3.5 HP Tecumseh H35 but lost its lighting coil; thus the Scrambler lost its front and rear lights. Instead of a headlight, the Scrambler was outfitted with a racing number plate which often sported a Rupp decal, most commonly reading, "Live it RUPP."
- Enduro – Rupp first released the Enduro model in 1970. The Enduro was identical to the Scrambler; however, it came with a 4 HP Tecumseh HS40 (with no lighting coil) for increased power. The Enduro also came with the number plate in place of a headlight and had drum brakes front and rear.
- Sprint – The Sprint was totally redesigned as well and was sold as the economy model for the new frame style. It appears as a mash-up of the older 1969 and newer 1970 models. It still used the 6" turbine wheels from the 1960s. It did not come with the TC-1 unit, instead using a single chain drive and with its own newly designed chrome chain guard. The Sprint came with the newly designed gas tank and seat to fit the new frame style. It used a shortened muffler instead of the longer chrome one offered on the Scrambler, Roadster and Enduro. The Sprint was available in red.
- Chopper – The last model for 1970 was the Chopper; it was identical to the 1969 Chopper. It came with a 2 1/2 HP Tecumseh engine, with an engine-mounted gas tank and no suspension. It had 6" turbine wheels and a rear scrub brake.

=== 1971 ===
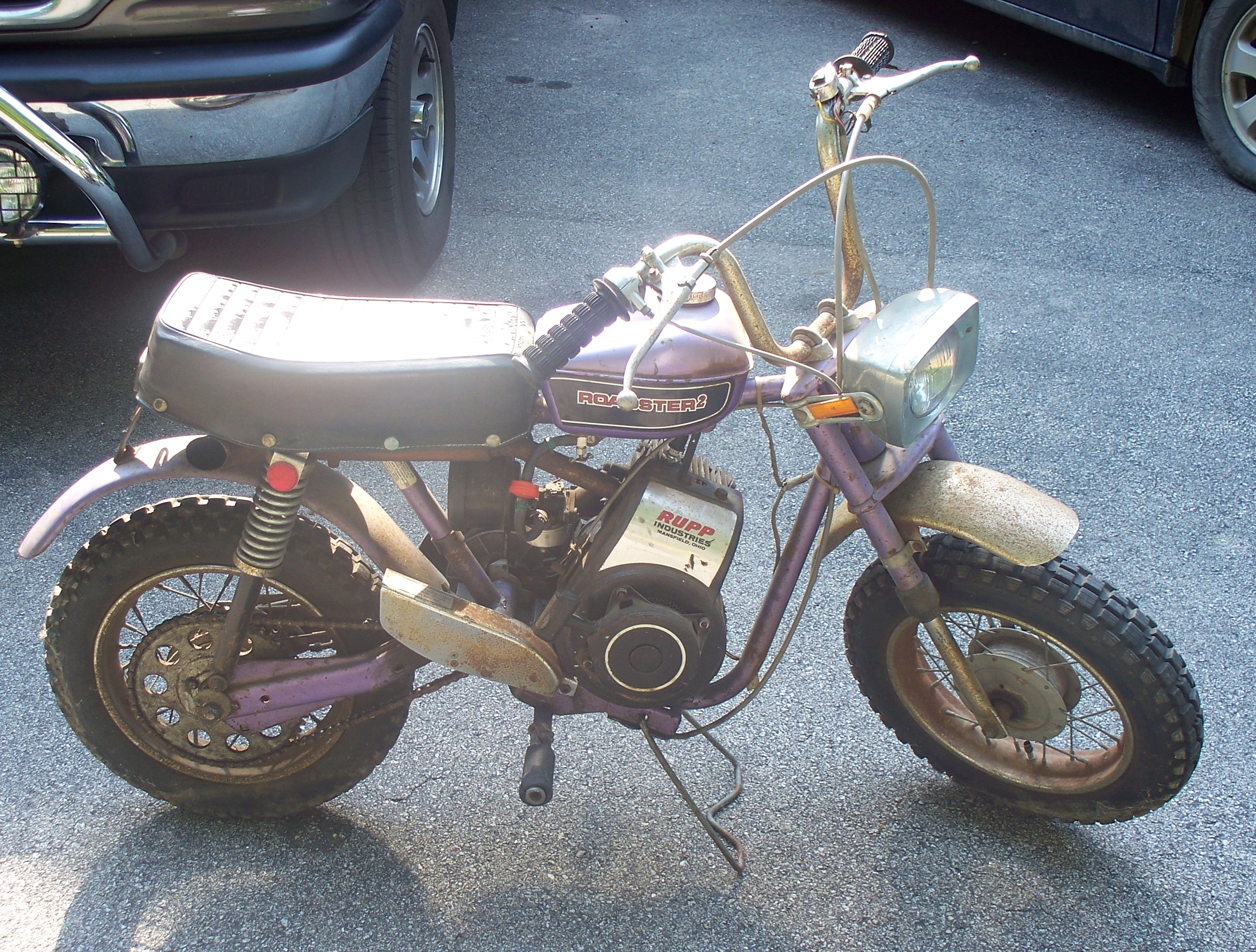
Original condition 1971 Rupp Roadster 2 mini bike in metallic purple

The year 1971 marked another set of changes to the Rupp line up. For the first time, 12" wire wheels were offered on bikes. The Roadster and Enduro were upgraded and a new model, the Black Widow, all came with the 12" wheels, either 24- or 28-spoke, the latter being rarer.

Some overall changes were made to the bikes: the handlebars were no longer welded to the mounts, the exhaust pipe now ran under the seat, the engines now used a float bowl carburetor/slanted intake combination and the front forks now had internal telescopic suspension. Bikes were offered in various colors, specific to the models.

- Roadster 2 – The Roadster became the Roadster 2, stylized Roadster/2, and was again the only Rupp with front and rear lights. It kept the Tecumseh HS40 engine but now used a float bowl carburetor. As mentioned, the wheels used were 12", replacing the 10" wheels. The Roadster 2 used the new telescopic front suspension and was offered in gloss red and metallic green, blue and purple. It was the only Rupp in 1971 available in metallic purple. Rupp also produced some Roadster/2s under the name "Swinger Trail" for Penneys.
- Enduro – Similar to 1970, the Enduro was an exact copy of the Roadster 2 without the headlights. One difference brought about in 1971 was the addition of Rupp "Motocross" tires to the Enduro. The motocross was a knobbier tire that enabled more traction in off-road conditions. The Enduro was offered in the same colors as the Roadster 2 with the exception of metallic purple.
- Black Widow – Perhaps the most famous of all Rupp mini bikes was introduced in 1971—the Black Widow. The Black Widow differed from the other Rupps offered in 1971 in a variety of ways. The Widow was outfitted with a Tecumseh HS40 without a lighting coil, similar to the Enduro; however, it came with a Dell'Orto carburetor for increased performance. The Black Widow also came with a chrome straight pipe exhaust and motocross tires. It had a chrome front and black painted rear fender. As its name suggests it was offered in black only. It was marketed as an off-road racing machine and claimed to be the best in its class.
- Scrambler – For 1971 the Scrambler was slightly modified. It came with 10" mag wheels; Rupp discontinued 10" wire wheels in 1971. It kept the Tecumseh H35 engine and again only had a rear brake. It was offered in metallic green.
- Hustler – Another new model was introduced in 1971, the Hustler. The Hustler was a slight upgrade from the Scrambler with a Tecumseh HS40 engine and front and rear brakes. It came with motocross tires on 10" mag wheels and was offered in metallic green, blue and gloss red.

Rupp introduced two new economy models for 1971, one using the newer frame style and another using the older style frame. The Rupp Bandit used the newer style frame on 10" mag wheels with Trials tires. It used a 2 1/1 HP Tecumseh engine with no TC-1 unit and the same chain guard as the 1970 Sprint. It had no suspension and was offered in blue only. The Rascal was essentially a renamed version of the 1969 and 1970 Chopper. It came in purple.

=== 1972 ===
Rupp cut back their mini bike offerings in 1972. They still offered the Hustler, Scrambler and Roadster 2. No new Enduros or Black Widows were produced though some were sold. The major change to the lineup was the color scheme. All Rupps now came with black frames, swingarms and motorcycle fork; the gas tanks and rear fenders were the only painted items. The specs of the bikes remained the same. The Hustler and Scrambler were offered in red only. The Roadster 2 was additionally available in a copper color.

=== 1973–1976 ===
Rupp minibikes saw even more cutbacks to the lineup in 1973. The only bike that remained was the newly designed Roadster, stylized as the Roadster II. It continued to use a Tecumseh HS40 but with a larger blower housing. It came in two color options, brown and magenta. It continued to use 12" wheels on Rupp Trials tires, with 24 spokes only. Rupp sold their last minibikes in 1976.

== Dirt Bikes ==
Recognizing the need for a larger model bike, Rupp began producing and selling dirt bikes in 1972. Many models were produced, including the RMT, L, SS, RMX, RST and MX. Rupp sold their last models, the RX-80 and RST-100 in 1975.

- RMT – The RMT80 was Rupp's first larger minicycle offered in 1972. It used a 2-cycle 80cc Fuji engine with four speed manual transmission. It featured a 17-inch front wheel and 16-inch rear wheel.
- L – Rupp manufactured two L-series dirt bikes in 1973, the L80 and L100. Both bikes used 2-cycle Fuji engines, in 80 and 100cc sizes. They were equipped with four- and five-speed manual transmissions, respectively.
- SS – The SS-5 was Rupp's only dirt bike that used a Tecumseh engine and automatic transmission. The engine was a Tecumseh HS50 and the transmission was a Rupp TC-1 torque converter unit.
- RMX – Rupp manufactured two RMX-series bikes, the RMX100 and 125. The RMX was Rupp's first machine powered by a Sachs engine.
- RST – The RST100 was one of Rupp's last two dirt bikes sold in 1975. It was blue in color, similar to the L100 and was also powered by a 100cc Fuji engine.
- MX – The MX80 was the smaller of the last two Rupp dirt bikes. It used the same 2-cycle 80cc Fuji that was used in the 1972 RMT80. It appeared very similar to the RMT; however, it was offered in green with yellow accents.

== Snowmobiles ==
Rupp manufactured some of the fastest and most sought after snowmobiles of their day. The first snowmobile produced by Rupp was the Sno Sport in 1964. Other models included the Yankee, Rally, Sprint, American, Magnum, Rogue, Nitro and others. Rupp also produced the world's first dragster snowmobile, the Rupp Super Sno Sport, in 1969. For 1972 and 1973, Rupp snowmobile models included:

- American – Billed as the "beauty" of their snowmobile line, the Rupp American came with electric start standard, in 30, 40 and 50HP models. All three models came with an 18" track width, speedometer and tachometer were optional.
- Yankee – The Yankee was offered in 25, 30 and 40HP models, all coming standard with manual start and 15.5" track width. Electric start, speedometer and tachometer were options.
- Rogue – The Rogue was offered with two engine sizes, 15 and 25HP. Manual start was standard, with electric start as an option.
- Nitro – Advertised as the "ultimate snow machine", the Rupp Nitro was offered in five models, all featuring Rupp twins-295, 340, 400, 440 and 650cc. Manual start was standard for all models, with 15.5" track width for the first four models and an 18" track for the Nitro 650. A speedometer was standard equipment for all models with a tachometer as an option. It featured a two-tone black and red color scheme.

== Other vehicles ==
Rupp also made some other vehicles including off-road and on road vehicles. These include the Go-Joe, Mini Go-Joe, Ruppster, Rat and Centaur. They also made some lesser known items, including a prototype ice boat.

- Ruppster – The Ruppster was Rupp's dune buggy machine, first produced in 1971. It was powered by a 12 HP engine and Rupp torque converter. It was advertised with the ability to climb 45 degree grades and reach speeds of over 40 mph. It had a red fiberglass body, had large 21 x 11 balloon style knobby tires and could seat two passengers. It retailed for about $1,000.

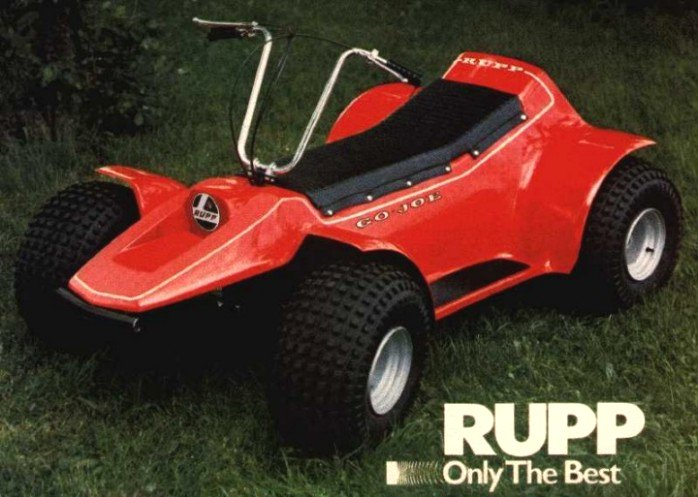
1973 Rupp Go-Joe with Rupp motto, "Only The Best"

- Go-Joe – The Go-Joe was Rupp's all-terrain vehicle produced in 1973. It too had a red or white fiberglass body and the same wheels as the Ruppster. It was powered by an 8 HP engine. Rupp also produced a Mini Go-Joe in limited quantities which was powered by a 3-1/2 HP engine. Rupp also had a Kohler 295cc single-cylinder 2-stroke engine option.
- Rat – The Rat was a fiberglass bodied three-wheeler off-road vehicle made in the early 1970s. There were two models, the Rat and the Rat Truk-R. The Rat had a red body and came with a 5 HP Tecumseh engine. The Truk-R had silver metal flake body with a pickup style bed. It came with a larger 8 HP Tecumseh engine. (Rat catalog reference) The Rat used some mini bike parts in its construction, including the turbine style 6" front wheel.

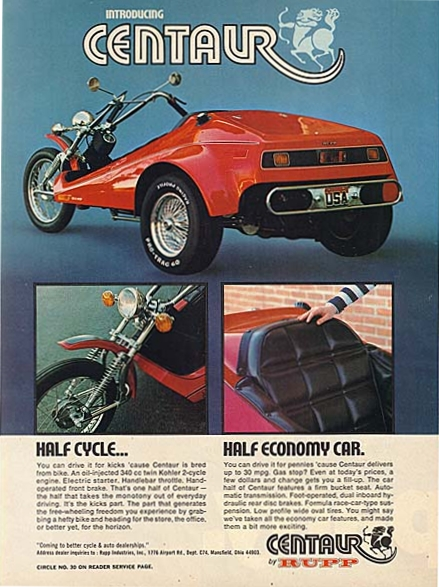
Original ad introducing the Rupp Centaur

- Centaur – The Centaur was a trike produced in 1974 and 1975 by Rupp and was the only true street legal machine Rupp made. They came in four colors: red, blue, white and yellow. They were made in one- and two-seater body styles. Rupp Centaurs were owned and driven by Elvis Presley. It was advertised as half cycle and half economy car and featured a 340cc Kohler 2-cycle oil injected engine with an advertised 30 mpg. It also had dual rear disc brakes and was electric start.
