= Vacon =

Finnish manufacturer

Vacon Plc
- Company type: Julkinen osakeyhtiö
- Traded as: Nasdaq Helsinki: VAC1V
- Industry: Industrial goods & services
- Founded: 1993 (as Vaasa Control Ltd)
- Fate: Acquired by Danfoss
- Successor: Danfoss
- Headquarters: Vaasa, Finland
- Area served: Worldwide
- Key people: Vesa Laisi (CEO), Panu Routila (Chairman of the Board)
- Products: Variable-speed AC drives
- Revenue: ▲€403.0 million (2013)
- Number of employees: 1,596 (2013)
- Divisions: 30 sales offices
- Website: www.vacon.com

Vacon was a Finnish manufacturer of variable-speed AC drives for adjustable control of electric motors, and inverters for producing energy from renewable sources and was headquartered in Vaasa, Finland. Vacon stands for Vaasa Control Ltd.

Vacon had production and R&D (Research and development) facilities in Europe, Asia, and North America, sales offices in 30 countries, and sales representatives and service partners in nearly 90 countries.

The shares of Vacon Plc (VAC1V) are quoted on the main list of the Helsinki stock exchange (NASDAQ OMX Helsinki). In 2013, Vacon’s revenues amounted to EUR 403.0 million, and the company employed globally approximately 1,600 people.

Typically, electric motors are equipped with variable speed AC drives as they help optimize process control and save electrical energy. Vacon has estimated that in 2013 its products helped save approximately 55 TWh of energy. This corresponds to approximately 22 hours of the world's annual electrical energy production. Also, the amount of energy produced from renewable energy sources with Vacon's AC drives was reported to be approximately 22 TWh.

In 2014, Danfoss purchased Vacon.

== Other ==
Visit from President Obama

On January 15, 2014, former US President Barack Obama visited Vacon’s R&D facility at the Research Triangle Park in North Carolina. Following a tour of the premises, he gave a speech to students at North Carolina State University where he mentioned Vacon.

Stuxnet Virus

Vacon NX frequency converter drives, also known as variable-frequency drives, were one of the two types of converters targeted by the Stuxnet Virus at the Iranian enrichment facility in Natanz, Iran. The worm would search a PLC for the specific identification number, in this case 9500h, that is assigned to the Vacon converter. Once found, the worm would continue to execute.
