= Meredith Clausen =

Meredith L. Clausen (born 1942) is an American architectural historian, and professor emerita in the School of Art and the Department of Architecture at the University of Washington in Seattle, Washington, USA. Her research encompasses 19th- and 20th-century American and European architecture and urbanism, with particular attention to modern and postmodern architecture, Parisian architecture, department stores, skyscrapers, and the relationship between architecture and cultural and economic change. Her work has examined architects and subjects including Pietro Belluschi, the Pan Am Building (now the MetLife Building), Michael Graves and postmodernism, the Samaritaine department store in Paris, I. M. Pei's renovation of the Louvre, pioneering women in American architecture, and architectural critic Ada Louise Huxtable. She is a Fellow of the Society of Architectural Historians and an Honorary Member of AIA Seattle.

== Education ==
Clausen graduated with a B.A. from Scripps College, Claremont, California, and went on to earn her M.A. (in 1972) and Ph.D. (in 1975) at the University of California, Berkeley. She taught at the University of Washington from 1979 until 2023. Her master's thesis examined the origins of Gothic architecture in Normandy, while her doctoral dissertation focused on Frantz Jourdain and the Samaritaine department store in Paris, a subject that would become one of her most influential areas of research.

== Academic Career ==
Clausen began teaching architectural history in the 1970s, holding appointments at institutions including Stanford University and the University of California, Berkeley. In 1979, she joined the faculty of the University of Washington in Seattle, where she taught for more than four decades, from 1979 until her retirement to emerita status in 2023. She served as an assistant professor from 1979 to 1985, associate professor from 1985 to 1993, and professor from 1993 to 2022. She also held affiliations with the university's programs in French and Italian Studies and the Ph.D. Program in the Built Environment.

Her teaching encompassed 20th-century and post-1945 architecture, 19th-century architecture, American architecture, Parisian architecture and urbanism, and introductory global architectural history. She taught architectural history in both the School of Art and the Department of Architecture, rather than as an expansion of architectural history within the art history curriculum. Her teaching and scholarship also developed an interest in digital scholarship, including the use of free, online, and accessible visual images as alternatives to older photographic collections.

Clausen's teaching and scholarship have examined the relationships among architecture, commerce, urban development, and public life, including subjects that challenged conventional disciplinary boundaries, such as shopping centers and retail architecture.

== Scholarship ==
=== Art Nouveau and Paris ===
Clausen's early scholarship focused on French Art Nouveau and the architect Frantz Jourdain. Her book Frantz Jourdain and the Samaritaine: Art Nouveau Theory and Criticism examined the Paris department store La Samaritaine and its place in the development of modern architecture and consumer culture. Her research on Parisian architecture spans the late 19th and 20th centuries, connecting Jourdain's La Samaritaine of the 1890s with later architectural interventions, including I. M. Pei's glass pyramid at the Louvre in the 1980s. This work considers architecture in relation to changing patterns of commerce, urban development, cultural institutions, and architectural modernity.

=== Commercial Architecture and Retail Culture ===
Throughout her career, Clausen has examined department stores, shopping centers, and other forms of commercial architecture. Her scholarship considers retail buildings as architectural responses to broader social, economic, and cultural transformations, including the development of mass consumer society. Her research on commercial architecture includes both European department stores and American shopping centers, placing these building types within the wider history of modern urban development.

=== Pietro Belluschi ===
A major strand of Clausen's scholarship concerns the work of architect Pietro Belluschi and his place in 20th-century American architecture. Her book Spiritual Space: The Religious Architecture of Pietro Belluschi examined Belluschi's church and other religious commissions through archival research and interviews. The book received the Washington State Governor's Award in 1993.

Clausen subsequently published Pietro Belluschi: Modern American Architect, a study of Belluschi's career and architectural work. The book examined his contribution to American modernism and his role in the development of architecture in the Pacific Northwest.

=== Corporate Architecture and the Pan Am Building ===
Clausen's research on corporate architecture has examined skyscrapers as symbols of profound postwar economic and cultural change. Her book The Pan Am Building and the Shattering of the Modernist Dream examined the history of the Pan Am Building, now the MetLife Building, in New York City, including its construction above Grand Central Terminal.

The study placed the building within broader debates over modernism, corporate architecture, urban development, historic preservation, and architectural criticism. Clausen examined how the building's history reflected changing attitudes toward modern architecture and the postwar city, as well as the tensions between corporate development and the preservation of historic urban environments.

=== Ada Louise Huxtable ===
Clausen has also researched the career and influence of architectural critic Ada Louise Huxtable. Her landmark publication on Huxtable for the Beverly Willis Architecture Foundation examined Huxtable's role in American architectural criticism and her significance in shaping public and professional discussions of architecture.

Clausen has continued this research in her manuscript Ada Louise Huxtable and the Grand Central: Book Ends of a Remarkable Career, which is currently under peer review at the Getty Research Institute. The project further connects Huxtable's career with questions of architectural criticism, preservation, and the changing architectural culture of New York City.

== Awards ==
Her book, Spiritual Space received a Washington State Governor's Writer's Award in 1993.

In 2023, Clausen was named a Fellow of the Society of Architectural Historians.

== Writings ==
- Clausen, Meredith, Frantz Jourdain and the Samaritaine: Art Nouveau Theory and Criticism, E. J. Brill, Leiden 1987; ISBN 90-04-07879-7
- Clausen, Meredith, The Pan Am Building and the Shattering of the Modernist Dream, MIT Press, Cambridge MA and London 2005; ISBN 0-262-03324-0
- Clausen, Meredith, Pietro Belluschi: Modern American Architect, MIT Press, Cambridge MA and London 1994; ISBN 0-262-03220-1
- Clausen, Meredith, Spiritual Space: The Religious Architecture of Pietro Belluschi. University of Washington Press, Seattle and London 1992; ISBN 0-295-97213-0
