= Kristoffer Clausen =

Norwegian filmmaker

Kristoffer Clausen is a Norwegian man who rose to prominence when he in 2010 claimed to have been living continuously in the wilderness for a whole year, reportedly living only from what he could find in nature. He made a film and wrote a book about his claimed experience.

In 2011, Clausen confessed to having temporarily interrupted his project several times, travelling to Sweden several times to visit his sick dad, who later died, go shopping, hunting and sleeping in hotels as he travelled. Clausen claimed that he was "very sorry". Afterwards, Clausen has retreated to his home in Fetsund, from which he runs a company selling hunting gear and films. Clausen makes many of his own hunting and survival films on YouTube. He has also featured on the British Fieldsportschannel.tv where he goes hunting in England with chef Mark Gilchrist.
