= Jørgen Mads Clausen =

Danish businessman (born 1948)

Jørgen Mads Clausen (born 23 September 1948) is a Danish businessman and philanthropist. He was the CEO of Danfoss, the Danish heating, refrigeration, and air conditioning company, from 1996 to 2009 then chairman until 2022. The company was founded by his father, Mads Clausen, and is controlled by his family. He is also the chairman of DI, the association of the Danish Industry, and has a sizeable investment in the WaveStar wave energy project.

== Education ==
Clausen graduated as a civil engineer from the Technical University of Denmark in 1972 and received an MBA from the University of Wisconsin in 1975.

== Career ==
In 1978, Clausen founded an IT company in Copenhagen. The company later closed with Clausen taking a personal loss and he joined Danfoss, his family's company, as head of technical coordination and research in 1981. In 1990, he became a member of the group's executive board.

In 1996, Clausen became chief executive of Danfoss, he was the first family member to run the company since his father died in 1966. He announced he would step down as CEO in 2008 after 12 years at the helm to transition to the role of chairman in April 2009. At that point, Danfoss had annual revenue of DKK 22 billion ($4103814060 USD) and 22,000 employees across 25 countries.

He vacated the chairmanship on March 25, 2022, transitioning the company's leadership to the family's next generation after a career as one of the most celebrated business leaders in Denmark. His family continued to control the company and Clausen continues to play a role in leadership as chairman emeritus.

In addition to his work at Danfoss, Clausen is on the board of Risø Research Center, Academy of Technical Sciences, and Danish Advanced Technology Foundation.

== Philanthropy ==
Clausen is a prolific philanthropist with a focus on his native region of Southern Denmark, much of which is channeled through the Bitten & Mads Clausen Foundation which he chaired until 2022, which distributes over DKK 100 million ($14131975 USD) annually.

In 2005, he and the foundation provided the initial capital injection of approximately DKK 200 million ($33350509 USD) to build Danfoss Universe, an amusement and science park on the island of Als southeast of Jutland. He doubled down in 2012 giving DKK 60 million ($11175866 USD) more as the park dropped the Danfoss name and became an independent nonprofit. The company also funds the Danfoss Museum, covering the company's story and Denmark's industrial history, in Nordborg which re-opened in 2018.

He has supported the University of Southern Denmark. In 2015, he donated DKK 1.22 million ($181334 USD) to elevate a student pilot into a commercial prototype. In 2016, he donated a further DKK 1 million ($148550 USD) to create an InnovationLab for engineering and design students at the university's Mads Clausen Institute. In 2022, he funded the expansion and modernization of a sports complex in Sønderborg with DKK 17 million ($2402436 USD) In 2024, he contributed DKK 10.3 million ($1637520 USD) towards a national nano‑chemical imaging infrastructure project led by SDU. He also funded construction at Business College Syd giving DKK 10.3 million ($1499375 USD) in 2019.

Following Russia's illegal invasion of Ukraine, Clausen donated DKK 7.5 million ($1059898 USD) to the Danish Refugee Council, Red Cross and Save the Children for humanitarian relief in Ukraine.

== Honors ==
Clausen has been made an honorary citizen of Nordborg on Als and Tianjin, China and a Knight of the 1st Class of the Norwegian Order of St. Olav in addition to multiple honors in his native Denmark.

- 2018: Commander of the Order of the Dannebrog
- 2010: Appointed Honorary Chamberlain
- 2004: "Leader of the Year" award, Ledernes Hovedorganisation
- 1990: Knight of the first degree, Order of the Dannebrog
- 1975: Knight, Order of the Dannebrog

== Personal life ==
He flies himself in a Cessna Citation V and is a big-game hunter. In 2005, his net worth was estimated at $3.5 billion. He is married to Anette Nøhr Clausen who he works with on charitable endeavors. They have two sons, Mads Nøhr Clausen and Marcus Nøhr Clausen.

Clausen supports free market economics. He is on the board of CEPOS. He opposes gender quotas on the boards of Danish state-owned companies stating they lead to less qualified boards. He has also criticized the Danish Tax Agency’s diesel tax rules calling for a crackdown on excessive bureaucracy and urged civil servants to apply common sense and more discretion.

== See also ==
- List of billionaires
- List of Danes by net worth
