= Mickey Rupp =

American racing driver (1936–2023)

- Nationality: American
- Full name: Herbert Edward Rupp II
- Born: January 17, 1936 Mansfield, Ohio, U.S.
- Died: August 20, 2023 (aged 87) Mansfield, Ohio, U.S.
- Years active: 1964–1965 (USAC Championship Car series)

Herbert Edward "Mickey" Rupp II (January 17, 1936 – August 20, 2023) was an American racecar driver and businessman. He was the founder of Rupp Industries and Rupp Marine and inductee of the North Central Ohio Entrepreneurial Hall of Fame.

== Racing career ==
Rupp raced in the USAC Championship Car series in the 1964 and 1965 seasons, with five career starts, including the 1965 Indianapolis 500. He finished in the top ten three times, including sixth position at Indy, with his best finish in fifth position in 1965 at Milwaukee.

== Rupp Industries ==
Rupp opened Rupp Industries in Mansfield, Ohio in the late 1950s. First producing go-karts, Rupp Industries would eventually produce their iconic mini bikes, motorcycles and snowmobiles with unit sales of up to 75,000 minibikes and 35,000 snowmobiles per year respectively. Rupp sold the company in 1973. Rupp Industries would go on to build some of the most advanced snowmobiles of the time, as well as dirt bikes and other recreational vehicles until they had to close their doors in 1978 due to bankruptcy. Rupp vehicles have since become very collectible.

== Rupp Marine ==
After moving to Florida and taking up the sport of fishing, Rupp sought to produce user-friendly and cost effective outriggers in 1979. Rupp founded Rupp Marine a year later in 1980.

== Retirement and death ==
Rupp turned over Rupp Marine to his son and son-in-law after more than 20 years at the helm of the company. He moved back to Mansfield, Ohio where he resided with his wife, Jeanie, and three black and white springer spaniels.

Rupp died on August 20, 2023, at the age of 87.

== References and sources ==
Notes
