= Dirk Markus =

Entrepreneur

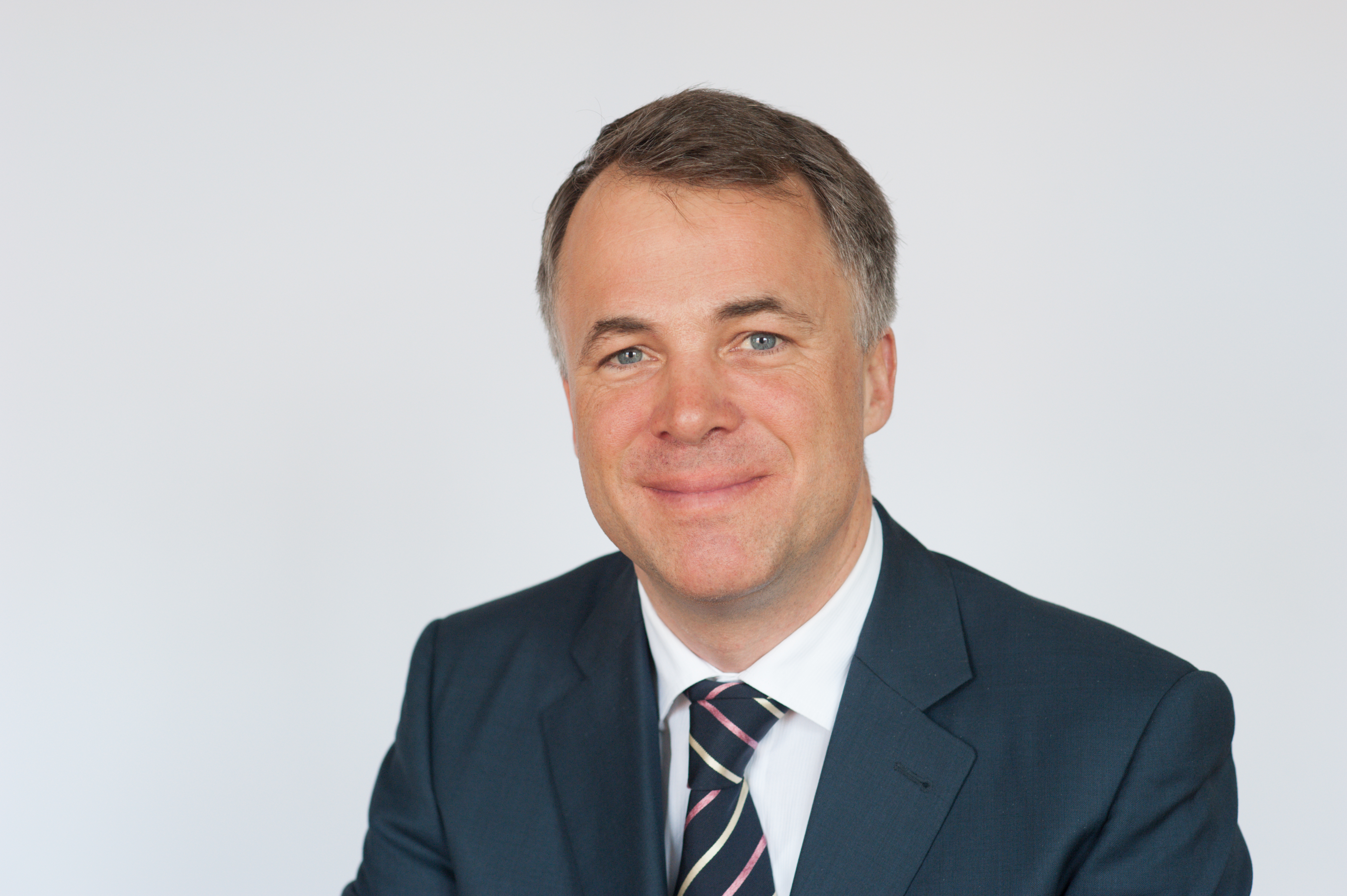

Dirk Erich Markus (born January 15, 1971) is a German-born entrepreneur. He is a founding partner of private equity investment group Aurelius. From an initial investment of €500,000 invested in 2005, Markus created one of Europe's largest private equity and asset management groups with revenues in the double-digit billions across various investment segments.

== Early life ==
Markus was born in Regensburg, Germany to parents Manfred and Ingrid Markus. As a child he moved to Austria where his father was professor of Anglistics at the University of Innsbruck and his mother was a teacher. Markus studied Business Administration with a minor in Russian at the University of St. Gallen, Switzerland. He received his doctorate in "Strategic Cooperation in the Multimedia Industry" from St. Gallen and was a visiting research fellow at Harvard University.

== Career ==
Markus started his career as a management consultant with McKinsey, where he focused on cost reduction as well as growth programs. He then founded Mercateo, an online business procurement platform where he was responsible for finance and corporate development. Following the sale of Mercateo to German utility E.ON, he co-founded a publicly owned industrial holding company.

Together with Gert Purkert, Markus co-founded investment company Aurelius in 2005. With startup capital of €500,000, they began acquiring companies in special situations and in periods of radical change. Today, Aurelius is a well-known global private equity group. Through various funds and investment vehicles Aurelius is currently invested in almost 50 portfolio companies worldwide.

== Personal life ==
Markus moved to London in 2013 and this is where he currently lives. In 1988, he set the tyrolean track & field record for 3×1000 m in the men's under-18 category. This record is still held today. In addition, Markus is a passionate racing cyclist, completing the 2017 Castle Ride in Tonbridge, Kent, at a time of 08:03:32. Markus is also an avid art collector and has a collection of over 350 socialist propaganda posters.
