= Clauson =

Clauson is a surname of Germanic origin. The name refers to:

- Albert Clauson, 1st_Baron_Clauson (1870–1946), Law Lord, Lord Justice of Appeal
- Bryan Clauson (1989–2016), American race car driver
- Clinton Clauson (1895–1959), American politician; governor of Maine 1959
- Sir Gerard Clauson (1891–1974), English Orientalist
- Hailey Clauson (b. 1995), American fashion model
- William Clauson (1930–2017), Swedish-American folk singer
