= John A. Clausen =

American sociologist

John Adam Clausen (December 20, 1914 – February 15, 1996) was an American sociologist and academic. After holding various positions during the 1940s, Clausen joined the National Institute of Mental Health in 1948 as a research consultant. With the institute, he led an environmental social science research laboratory he created from 1951 to 1960. As a part of the NIMH, he also conducted research on schizophrenia and mental health. In 1960, Clausen became a sociology professor for the University of California, Berkeley and continued to teach until his retirement in 1982.

During his tenure, he participated in the Berkeley Intergenerational Study as a researcher and project leader during the longitudinal study. For executive positions, Clausen held the directorship of the university's Institute of Human Development from 1960 to 1966. He also led the university's sociology department as its chairperson from 1976 to 1979. During his lifetime, Clausen was given the Common Wealth Award of Distinguished Service for sociology in 1986. He was also elected to the National Academy of Medicine in 1977 and the American Academy of Arts and Sciences in 1989

== Early life and education ==
On December 20, 1914, Clausen was born in New York City, New York, the second son of Adam Peter (a salesman) and Mary Blum Clausen. For his post-secondary education, Clausen started out at Cornell University and earned both a Bachelor of Arts and Master of Arts in the late 1930s. In 1949, he graduated from the University of Chicago with a Doctor of Philosophy in sociology.

== Career ==
In 1939, Clausen started his career as a research assistant at the Institute for Juvenile Research in Chicago, Illinois. During the early 1940s, he worked with the Virginia State Planning Board and conducted research on population as a statistician. Throughout World War II, Clausen performed research on the morale of Army soldiers during combat. After working for a year in research design for the Veterans Health Administration in Washington, D.C., Clausen taught sociology from 1946 to 1948 at Cornell as an assistant professor.

In 1948, Clausen started his tenure with the National Institute of Mental Health as a research consultant. While at the institute, he opened a environmental social science research laboratory for the NIMH in 1951 and led the laboratory until 1960. As a mental health researcher, Clausen was a co-researcher of a mid 1950s study that conducted research on schizophrenia and parenting. In the early 1960s, Clausen expanded his schizophrenia research when he studied how mental illness affected marriages.

In 1960, Clausen joined the University of California, Berkeley as a sociology professor and the director of the Institute of Human Development. As he continued to teach sociology until 1982, Clausen held the Institute directorship until 1966. Between 1976 and 1979, Clausen also led the sociology department as its chairperson. While at California, Clausen joined an ongoing longitudinal study from the 1930s to 1990s on Californians born in the 1920s. As part of the Berkeley Intergenerational Study, Clausen worked as a researcher and project leader. In 1982, Clausen became emeritus upon his retirement.

== Works ==
As a sociologist, Clausen released Sociology and the Field of Mental Health in 1956. Clausen later published The Life Course: A Sociological Perspective in 1986. Clausen published the Berkeley longitudinal study findings in a 1993 book titled American Lives: Looking Back at the Children of the Great Depression. Apart from writing, Clausen was an editor for Socialization and Society in 1968 and the 1982 publication of Present and Past in Middle Life.

== Awards and honors ==
In 1986, Clausen was given the Common Wealth Award of Distinguished Service for his sociological career. From the American Sociological Association, Clausen received the 1987 Leo G. Reeder Award for his work in medical sociology and the 1990 Cooley-Mead Award for his work in social psychology. As a member of scientific institutions, Clausen was elected to the National Academy of Medicine in 1977 and the American Academy of Arts and Sciences in 1989.

== Death and personal life ==
Clausen died in Berkeley, California on February 15, 1996. He was married in 1939 to the former Suzanne A. Ravage (1916-1993); they had four sons: Christopher John (born 1942), Peter Anthony (1944-1991), Bruce Martin (born 1946), and Michael Allen (1947-2012).
