= Bitten Clausen =

Danish factory owner

Dorthea (Bitten) Emma Clausen (born Andkjær Hinrichsen) (20 October 1912 – 7 March 2016) was a Danish factory owner and widow of the founder of Danfoss, Mads Clausen. She was also the mother of Jørgen Mads Clausen.

== Background, career and death ==
Bitten Clausen was baptized Dorthea Emma Andkjær Hinrichsen. She was a daughter of the merchant Waldemar Andkjær Hinrichsen and his wife Marie (née Waaben).

After the death of her husband in 1966, Bitten Clausen was chairman of the board for Danfoss until 1971. In 1971 she founded Bitten og Mads Clausens Fond, for which she was chairman until 1999.

The ferry M/F Bitten Clausen, sailing between Hardeshøj on Als and Ballebro in Jylland, was named after her.

Bitten Clausen died on 7 March 2016, aged 103 years old.
