= Frederik Kiehn Clausen =

Danish handball player (born 1995)

Frederik Clausen
Personal information
- Full name: Frederik Kiehn Clausen
- Nationality: Danish
- Born: 29 July 1995 (age 31) Svendborg, Denmark
- Height: 1.97 m (6 ft 6 in)

Sport
- Sport: Handball
- Position: Left back
- Current club: GOG Håndbold
- Number: 77

Senior clubs
- Years: Team
- 2010–: GOG Håndbold
National team
Years	Team	Apps	(Gls)
2015–	Denmark	10	(1)
Medal record
Junior World Championship
Silver medal – second place	2015 Brazil

Frederik Kiehn Clausen (born 29 July 1995) is a Danish handball player who plays for GOG Håndbold and the Danish national team. He has also played several matches for the Danish national junior and youth teams. He has played his entire career at GOG and is the captain of the club.

He made his international debut on the Danish national team on 20 June 2015 against Poland.

He also participated at the 2015 Men's Junior World Handball Championship in Brazil, placering 2nd.

== Achievements ==
- Danish Handball League:
  - Winner: 2022, 2023
  - Runners-up: 2019, 2020
- Danish Handball Cup:
  - Winner: 2019, 2022
  - Finalist: 2021
