= Kasper Klausen =

Danish footballer (born 1982)

Personal information
- Date of birth: 20 December 1982 (age 43)
- Place of birth: Denmark
- Height: 1.79 m (5 ft 10 in)
- Position: Midfielder

Team information
- Current team: Hvidovre IF

Youth career
- 1988–2000: Hvidovre IF

Senior career*
Years	Team	Apps	(Gls)
2000–2003	Hvidovre IF		
2003–2005	BK Skjold		
2005–2008	AC Horsens	46	(3)
2008–present	Hvidovre IF		
- * Club domestic league appearances and goals as of 16 June 2008

Kasper Klausen (born 20 December 1982) is a Danish professional football midfielder, who currently is playing for Hvidovre IF.

Klausen joined AC Horsens in the summer of 2005, following the team's promotion to the Superliga, and was during the first season a regular starter for the team. He scored 2 goals and played his part in the team's surprising survival in the league. Due to injuries, Klausen lost his place in the team during the following season, and has not yet regained his former strength.
