= Aurelius Group =

German investment company

Aurelius Investment Advisory Limited
- Industry: Asset Management
- Founded: 2005; 21 years ago
- Founders: Dirk Markus; Gert Purkert
- Key people: Dirk Markus, Gert Purkert, Donatus Albrecht, Matthias Täubl, Tristan Nagler
- Divisions: Aurelius Opportunities Fund V; Aurelius European Opportunities Fund IV; AUR Portfolio III SE & Co. KGaA; Aurelius Growth Investments; Aurelius Finance Company; Aurelius Real Estate Opportunities
- Website: www.aurelius-group.com

Aurelius is a global alternative investor with offices in Amsterdam, Chicago, London, Luxembourg, Malta, Milan, Munich, New York, and Stockholm. The company focuses on private equity, private debt and real estate investments.

== History ==
In 2005, Dirk Markus and Gert Purkert, both former McKinsey consultants, founded Aurelius as a privately held investment vehicle with a start-up capital of €500,000, investing in small- and medium-sized companies.

In 2006, Aurelius AG was listed in the Open Market segment of the Frankfurt Stock Exchange. The company was converted into an SE & Co. KGaA in 2015, and withdrew from the stock exchange at the end of 2023. It was renamed AUR Portfolio III SE & Co- KGaA at the end of 2024.

== Funds ==
In April 2021, Aurelius launched AURELIUS Opportunities Fund IV, a more than €500 million investment fund specializing in complex corporate carve-outs and operational transformation. Its investors include US and European university endowments, pension funds, insurance companies and family offices.

AURELIUS Opportunities Fund V followed in June 2025 with €830m in committed capital. It pursues the same investment strategy as Fund IV and has largely the same investors.
