= Mads Clausen =

Danish businessman

Mads Clausen (21 October 1905 – 27 August 1966) born in Elsmark, parish of Havnbjerg, municipality of Nordborg in Denmark, was a Danish industrialist and founder of Danfoss in 1933. He died in transit from Elsmark to Sønderborg.

He married Dorthea "Bitten" Emma Clausen (née Dorthea Emma Andkjær Hinrichsen; 1912–2016) in 1939. The couple had five children:

- Karin Clausen (b. 1940)
- Bente Clausen (b. 1942)
- Jørgen Mads Clausen (b. 1948), chairman of Danfoss's board of directors
- Peter Johan Mads Clausen (b. 1949)
- Henrik Mads Clausen (b. 1953)

== See also ==
- Universe (Danish amusement park), a Danish science park established by Danfoss
