= Tecumseh Products =

American manufacturer of compressors

Tecumseh Products Company LLC
- Company type: Subsidiary
- Traded as: Formerly Nasdaq: TECU
- Industry: Manufacturing
- Founded: 1934
- Headquarters: Ann Arbor, Michigan, United States
- Area served: Worldwide
- Key people: Ricardo Maciel (CEO)
- Products: Hermetic compressors and refrigeration equipment
- Revenue: ▼US$ 824.7 million (FY 2012)
- Operating income: ▲US$ 19.90 million (FY 2012)
- Net income: ▼US$ 1.2 million (FY 2017)
- Total assets: ▲US$ 527.9 million (FY 2012)
- Total equity: ▲US$ 258.4 million (FY 2012)
- Number of employees: 5,800
- Parent: Mueller Industries & Atlas Holdings
- Divisions: Evergy, Inc. Tecumseh do Brasil; Tecumseh Canada; Tecumseh Europe
- Subsidiaries: MasterFlux; TMT Motoco; TPC Refrigeration de Mexico; Tecumotor; Tecumseh Power Company
- Website: www.tecumseh.com

Tecumseh Products Company is an American manufacturer of hermetic compressors for air conditioning and refrigeration products. Tecumseh Products Company has subsidiaries that sell externally and internally to Tecumseh. The Tecumseh corporate offices are located in Ann Arbor, Michigan.

== History ==
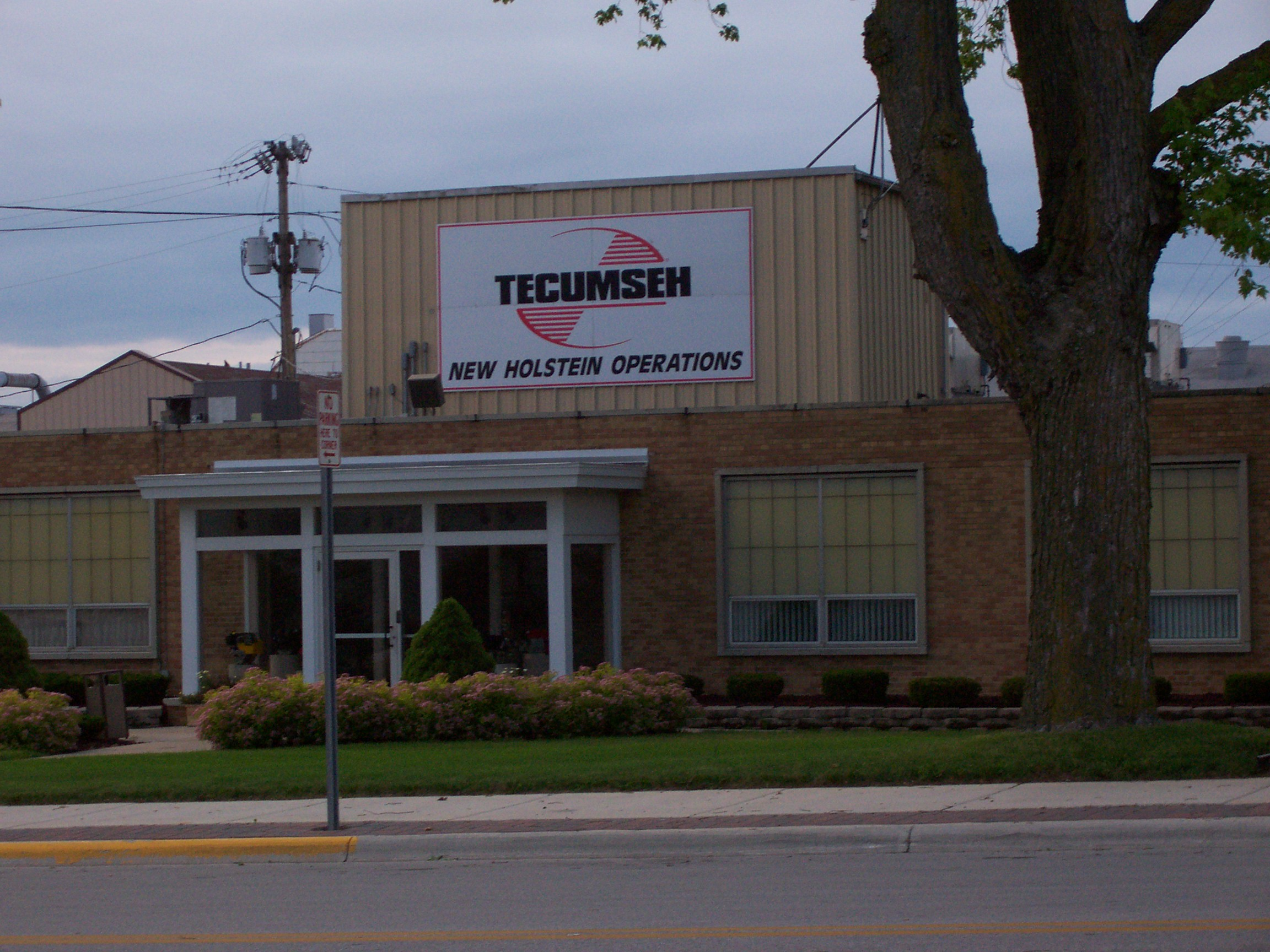
Former New Holstein, Wisconsin engine manufacturing plant in 2006, with Tecumseh logo

Tecumseh products began in a livery stable on Railroad Street in Hillsdale, Michigan in 1931 as the Hillsdale Machine and Tool Company. Originally founded by Charles Floyd Sage (better known as Bill), Ray W. Herrick, Olin Freed, Marshall Davis, and Wilbut Groauman in order to make parts for Ford Motors, the company began to grow quickly after Frank Smith joined Hillsdale with an idea for a refrigerated compressor. The operations soon outgrew the livery stable, and in 1934 the company moved to the town of Tecumseh and changed its name to Tecumseh Products Co. By 1950, Tecumseh was the largest independent manufacturer of refrigerated compressors in the world.

In 1956 Tecumseh entered the small engine market acquiring Lauson and in 1957, acquired the Power Products Company- maker of 2 cycle engines found in many antique chainsaws. In 2007, the company's former gasoline engine and power train product lines were sold to Platinum Equity LLC. In December 2008, the company closed its engine manufacturing division. Later Tecumseh Power sold off its Peerless transmissions business to Husqvarna Outdoor Products. In 2009, Tecumseh Products completed a move from Tecumseh, Michigan to Pittsfield Charter Township, Michigan.

Tecumseh Power closed its doors in February 2009 when Platinum Equity LLC announced that Tecumseh Power Company had sold certain assets of its engine business to Certified Parts Corporation, including all existing and unfinished engine parts inventory, tools to make finished product, and certain intellectual property assets.

In 2015, Mueller Industries and Atlas Holdings completed the purchase of Tecumseh's refrigeration business.

== Price-fixing lawsuits ==
Pittsfield Township-based Tecumseh Products Co., along with units of Benton Harbor-based Whirlpool Corp., as well as Danfoss Compressors GmbH, agreed in 2013 to a settlement in a price-fixing lawsuit. The settlement cost Tecumseh approximately $7 million, according to a report in Crain's Detroit Business. The lawsuit, which was consolidated before U.S. District Judge Sean Cox in 2009, centers on a secret meeting between executives of the companies as well as Panasonic Corp., and an Italy-based components company. According to Crain's, the group allegedly met at a hotel in 2004 as part of a conspiracy to inflate the price of compressors. Crain's reported the settlement totaled $41 million and must be approved by Judge Cox before it is implemented. Tecumseh's portion represents 2.7 percent of the company's sales between February 2005 and December 2008.

== Gasoline engine components ==
In 2007, the company's former gasoline engine and power train product lines, which is what the company had been most known for, were sold to Platinum Equity LLC, which does business as Tecumseh Power. Tecumseh engine products at one time were sold in over 120 countries. In December 2008, the company closed its engine manufacturing division. Tecumseh Power sold off its Peerless transmissions business to McDermott Outdoor Products.

On February 10, 2009, Platinum Equity LLC announced that Tecumseh Power Company had sold certain assets of its engine business to Certified Parts Corporation. This included the sale of existing and unfinished engine parts inventory, tools to make finished product and certain intellectual property assets. Certified Parts Corporation also assumed responsibility for warranty of previous engine sales.

In an interview published by The Janesville Gazette on February 10, 2009, Certified Parts Corporation President Jim Grafft said "that he plans to move the engine operation to Rock County, Wisconsin, where he owns three facilities in Janesville and one in Edgerton, and will initially supply parts for Tecumseh Power engines. Grafft also said that his company could eventually resume engine production, which Tecumseh Power ceased in December 2008".

On September 1, 2010, Certified Parts Corporation (CPC) of Janesville, Wisconsin, announced it had entered into an agreement with Liquid Combustion Technology (LCT) of Travelers Rest, South Carolina, to jointly manufacture air-cooled engines for the outdoor power equipment market. The agreement provided CPC with engineering, manufacturing, and sales capabilities allowing it to reintroduce the Snow King line of snow thrower engines and other engines formerly manufactured and sold by Tecumseh Power. The engines are exclusively represented by LCT, and sold under the Snow King, Lauson, and LCT brands and serviced exclusively by CPC and the existing Tecumseh Power dealer/distributor network. Traditionally, the Snow King line of engines had powered more snowthrowers than all other brands combined. LCT's horizontal 4-stroke gasoline engine product offering was extended by this agreement, and allowed CPC and LCT to provide single cylinder and V-twin vertical engines to outdoor power equipment manufacturers.
