= Claassens =

Claassens is an Afrikaans, Dutch and Low German patronymic surname. Notable people with the surname include:

- Jannie Claassens (born 1969), South African rugby union player
- Johnny Claassens, South African footballer
- Errie Claassens (born 1981), South African rugby union player
- Michael Claassens (born 1982), South African rugby union player

== See also ==
- Claassen
- Claessen
- Claessens
- Clason
- Classen
- Classun
- Clausen
- Claussen
- Klaassen
- Klassen
