= Klaas =

- Pronunciation: [klaːs]
- Gender: male

Origin
- Origin: Dutch

Klaas is a Dutch male given and surname. It is the Dutch short form of Nicholas (Dutch: Nicolaas), a Greek name ultimately meaning victory of the people. A traditionally common name in the Netherlands, its popularity has declined some 20-fold since 1950. Archaic spellings include Claas and Claes. Among its female derivatives are Klaasje, Clasien, Clasina, Clasine, Clazien, Klasien, Klasina and Klaziena. Klaas also exists as a patronymic surname, though the forms Klaasen, Klaassen, Claassen, Claessen, and Claessens are more common.

== People with the given name ==
- Klaas (fl. 1780), Khoikhoi guide and namesake of Klaas's cuckoo
- Klaas Afrikaner (fl. 1760–1800), Nama captain of the Orlam Afrikaners
- Klaas Annink (1710–1775), Dutch serial killer
- Klaas Bakker (1926–2016), Dutch footballer
- Klaas Balk (born 1948), Dutch cyclist
- Klaas van Berkel (born 1953), Dutch historian of science
- Klaas de Boer (born 1942), Dutch-born American soccer player
- Klaas Bolt (1927–1990), Dutch organist and improviser
- Klaas Bom (1937–2025), Dutch engineer
- Klaas Breeuwer (1901–1961), Dutch footballer
- Klaas van den Broek (born 1955), Dutch ice hockey player
- Klaas Bruinsma (1931–2018), Dutch translator to West Frisian
- Klaas Bruinsma (1953–1991), Dutch drug baron
- Klaas Buchly (1910–1965), Dutch cyclist
- Klaas Carel Faber (1922–2012), Dutch WWII war criminal
- Klaas Dijkhoff (born 1981), Dutch politician and legal scholar
- Klaas Gerling (born 1981), German DJ known as "Klaas"
- Klaas de Groot (born 1940), Dutch bioengineer
- Klaas Gubbels (born 1934), Dutch painter and sculptor
- Klaas Hendrikse (1947–2018), Dutch atheist pastor
- Klaas Heufer-Umlauf (born 1983), German television host
- Klaas van der Horst (1731–1825), Dutch Mennonite teacher and minister
- Klaas-Jan Huntelaar (born 1983), Dutch footballer
- Klaas Knot (born 1967), Dutch economist and central banker
- Klaas Kruik (1678–1754), Dutch cartographer and meteorologist better known as Cruquius
- Klaas Lodewyck (born 1988), Belgian cyclist
- Klaas van der Meulen (1642–1693), Dutch glass painter
- Klaas Jan Mulder (1930–2008), Dutch organist, pianist, and conductor
- Klaas van Nek (1899–1986), Dutch racing cyclist
- Klaas-Jan van Noortwijk (born 1970), Dutch cricketer
- Klaas Nuninga (born 1940), Dutch footballer
- Klaas Ooms (1917–1970), Dutch footballer
- Klaas Jan Pen (1874–1932), Dutch sports shooter
- Klaas Plantinga (1846–1922), Dutch distiller
- Klaas Reimer (1770–1837), Prussian mennonite
- Klaas Runia (1926–2006), Dutch theologian and journalist
- Klaas Rusticus (born 1942), Dutch author and television and film director
- Klaas Schilder (1890–1952), Dutch theologian and professor
- Klaas Sijtsma, Dutch psychologist
- Klaas Smit (1930–2008), Dutch footballer
- Klaas Sybrandi (1807–1872), Dutch Mennonite minister
- Klaas Sys (born 1986), Belgian cyclists
- Klaas Twisk (1930–1999), Dutch racing driver
- Klaas Vantornout (born 1982), Belgian cyclist
- Klaas Veenhof (1935–2023), Dutch Assyriologist
- Klaas Veering (born 1981), Dutch field hockey goalkeeper
- Klaas Vermeulen (born 1988), Dutch field hockey player
- Klaas Vriend (1952–2019), Dutch speed skater
- Klaas de Vries (disambiguation), multiple people
- Klaas de Waard, alias of Aart Alblas (1918–1944), Dutch navy officer and resistance member
- Klaas Wiersma (1917–1993), Dutch legal scholar and politician
- Klaas Woldendorp (1871–1936), Dutch sports shooter
- Klaas Worp (born 1943), Dutch papyrologist
- Klaas-Erik Zwering (born 1981), Dutch swimmer and an Olympic medalist

=== Claas ===
- Claas Epp, Jr. (1838–1913), Russian Mennonite minister
- Claas Hugo Humbert (1830–1904), German scientist and writer

=== Fiction ===
- Klaas Vaak is the traditional Dutch name for the Sandman

== People with the surname ==
- C. J. Klaas (born 1983), American soccer defensive midfielder
- Kathrin Klaas (born 1984), German hammer thrower
- Masabata Klaas (born 1991), South African cricketer
- Polly Klaas (1981–1993), American murder victim
- Urmas Klaas (born 1971), is Estonian politician
- Werner Klaas (1914–1945), German footballer

== See also ==
- Claus / Klaus, German forms of Klaas
- Nicholas
- Klaas's cuckoo (Chrysococcyx klaas), named after Klaas, a Khoikhoi man who found the type specimen
- Klaas Smits River in Eastern Cape, South Africa
