= Claasen =

Claasen is a surname. Notable people with the surname include:

- Daylon Claasen (born 1990), South African international footballer
- Hermann Claasen (1899–1987), German photographer

== See also ==
- Claasen's law, a law of technology usefulness
- Claassen, surname
- Classen, surname
- Klaasen, surname
- Klaassen, surname
