= Claassen =

Claassen is an Afrikaans, Dutch and Low German patronymic surname. It may refer to:

- Arthur Claassen (1859–1920), German orchestral conductor
- Ben Claassen III (born 1977), American comics artist and illustrator
- Fay Claassen (born 1969), Dutch jazz singer
- George Claassen (born ca. 1950), South African writer, brother of Wynand
- J. G. Claassen (born 1991), South African golfer
- Johan Claassen (1929–2019), South African rugby player
- Neil Claassen (born 1992), South African rugby player
- Peter Walter Claassen (1886–1937), American entomologist
  - Claasenia, a genus of stoneflies, Claassen's skolly, a butterfly
- René Claassen (born 1971), Dutch politician
- Ruben Claassen (born 1993), South African cricketer
- Tom Claassen (born 1964), Dutch sculptor
- Utz Claassen (born 1963), German manager
- Wynand Claassen (born 1951), South African rugby player, brother of George

== See also ==
- Claassens
- Claessen
- Claessens
- Clason
- Classen
- Classun
- Clausen
- Claussen
- Klaassen
- Klassen
