= Classen =

Classen or Claßen is a Germanic patronymic surname, a variant of Klassen, derived from the name Klas, variant of Klaus, a diminutive of Niklaus. Notable people with the surname include:

- Aimée Classen, American ecologist
- Alexander Classen (1843–1934), German chemist
- Andy Classen, German musician, sound engineer and record producer
- Barbara Claßen (1957–1990), German judoka
- Bianca Claßen (born 1993), German fashion and beauty YouTuber
- Carl Joachim Classen (1928–2013), German classical scholar
- Chad Classen (born 1997), South African cricketer
- Edmond Classen (1938–2014), Dutch actor
- Erin Classen (born 2004), Australian squash player
- Gertrud Classen (1905–1974), German resistance activist
- Greg Classen (born 1977), German-Canadian ice hockey player
- J. Bart Classen, American immunologist and opponent of vaccination
- Johan Frederik Classen (1725–1792), Danish-Norwegian industrialist, major general and landowner
- Johannes Classen (1805–1891), German educator and classical philologist
- Llewellyn Classen, South African cricketer
- Maja Classen (born 1974), German film director and screenwriter
- Peter Hersleb Classen (1738–1825), Norwegian-Danish statesman
- Robin Classen (born 1991), German politician (AfD)
- Sabina Classen (born 1963), German thrash metal singer

== See also ==
- Claasen, surname
- Claassen, surname
- The Classen, residential high-rise in Oklahoma City
- Classen Library, public library in Denmark
- Classen Mansion, neoclassical manor house in Denmark
- Classen School of Advanced Studies
- Klassen, surname
- Klaasen, surname
- Klaassen, surname
