= Brocken (disambiguation) =

The Brocken is the highest peak in northern Germany. It also may refer to:

- Brocken station, the railway on the summit of the Brocken
- Sender Brocken, a facility for FM and TV transmitters on Brocken Mountain
- Brocken spectre, also called Brocken bow or mountain spectre, an atmospheric optical phenomenon
- Brocken-Hochharz, a collective municipality in Saxony-Anhalt, Germany
- Brocken, South Georgia, a mountain
- Brocken, a poem book from Johann Peter Klassen
- Bud Brocken (1957–2025), Dutch footballer
- Brocken Jr., a character in the Kinnikuman wrestling anime series
- Brocken (World Heroes), a character in the World Heroes fighting game series
- Count Brocken, a villain from the fictional robot anime Mazinger Z
- a colloquial word in German for rock or a big piece of something
