= Closson =

Closson is a surname. Notable people with the surname include:

- Georges Closson (1865–1945), French architect
- Gilles-François Closson (1796–1842), landscape painter
- Henry W. Closson (1832–1917), career officer in the United States Army
- William Closson (1848–1926), American artist

== See also ==
- Classon
- Clisson
- Klassen
