= Claussen =

Claussen is a surname. Notable people with the surname include:

== Athletes ==
- Brandon Claussen (born 1979), American baseball player
- Georg Claussen (1895–1967), Danish cyclist
- Hans Claussen (1911–2001), German weightlifter
- Simon Claussen (born 1991), Norwegian sport shooter

== Artists ==
- Amalie Claussen (1859–1950), Danish photographer
- Gro Pedersen Claussen (born 1941), Norwegian graphic designer
- James Claussen, American lithographer and painter
- Sophus Claussen (1865–1931), Danish poet

== Performers ==
- Frank Claussen (born 1976), Norwegian guitarist
- Julia Claussen (1879–1941), Swedish mezzo-soprano

== Political figures ==
- Andreas Claussen (1883–1957), Norwegian barrister, civil servant and politician
- Bruno Claußen (1884–?), German lawyer, civil servant and business executive
- Claus Christian Claussen (born 1961), German politician (CDU)
- Eileen Claussen (born 1945), President of the Center for Climate and Energy Solutions
- George C. Claussen (1882–1948), Justice of the Iowa Supreme Court
- Jonathan Claussen, American politician from Minnesota
- Otto Claussen Iberri (born 1964), Mexican politician
- Peter H. Claussen (1894–1990), American politician from Nebraska

== Religious leaders ==
- Geoffrey Claussen, American rabbi
- Johann Hinrich Claussen (born 1964), German Protestant theologian, church cultural representative, and author

== Scientists ==
- Claus-Frenz Claussen (1939–2022), German neurotologist

== Businesses ==
- Claussen pickles
- Claussen and Claussen, architecture firm

== Sites ==
- Claussen's Bakery, historic site in Columbia, South Carolina
- Claussen House, historic site in Florence, South Carolina
- William Claussen House, historic site in Davenport, Iowa

== See also ==
- Clausen
