= Claessen =

Claessen is a Dutch patronymic surname ("son of Claes"). Notable people with the surname include:

- Bart Claessen (born 1980), Dutch dance DJ known as Barthezz
- Frédéric Claessens (1896–1931), Belgian cyclist
- George Claessen (1909–1999), Sri Lankan artist and poet
- Hans Claessen (1562–1623), Dutch merchant and founder of the New Netherland Company
- Henri J. M. Claessen (1930–2022), Dutch anthropologist
- Roger Claessen (1941–1982), Belgian football player

Claesen

- Ludo Claesen (born 1956), Belgian conductor
- Nico Claesen (born 1962), Belgian football player

== See also ==
- Claessens, surname
- Claassen, surname
- Klaasen, surname
- Klaassen, surname
