= Claes Eklundh =

Swedish artist

Claes Eklundh (born 1944 in Malmö, Sweden) is a Swedish artist. Since 1964, he has lived and worked in among others Florence, Rome, Paris, Berlin and New York City and has exhibited extensively in Europe and North America. He now resides in Malmö, and is also a member of the Royal Swedish Academy of Arts, Stockholm.

His studies began at the Royal Academy of Arts in Stockholm (1965–70), continued with the Royal Danish Academy of Art in Copenhagen (1975–76) and were completed at the Accademia di Belle Arti in Florence (1977–1978).

Eklundh is represented in the British Museum, London, and the Museum of Modern Art, Stockholm, among other places.

== Bibliography ==
- Ulf Linde; Ola Billgren (1981). Claes Eklundh (in Swedish). Kalejdoskop. ISBN 9789185552245.
