= Classon =

Classon is a surname of Swedish origin, the patronymic form of the name Claes (the Swedish equivalent of Claus). Notable people with the surname include:

- David G. Classon (1870–1930), American politician
- Krister Classon (born 1955), Swedish comedian and actor
- Conor Classon, Irish sportsperson

== See also ==
- Classon's Bridge, bridge over the River Dodder in Dublin, Ireland
- Classon Avenue (IND Crosstown Line), a station on the New York City subway
