= Claes =

Male given name

Claes is a masculine given name, a version of Nicholas, as well as a patronymic surname. It is also spelled Klas, Clas and Klaes.

== Given name ==
Claes is a common first name in Sweden. It was also a common name in the Low Countries until the 18th century, after which the spelling Klaas was largely adopted. People with the given name Claes include:

- Claes Adelsköld (1824–1907), Swedish engineer, military officer and politician
- Claes Andersson (1937–2019), Finnish psychiatrist and politician
- Claes Bang (born 1967), Danish actor and musician
- Claes van Beresteyn (1627–1684), Dutch landscape painter
- Claes Berglund (born c.1960), Swedish ski-orienteering competitor
- Claes Björklund (born 1971), Swedish musician, producer and songwriter
- Claës Bonde (1878–1965), Swedish diplomat and courtier
- Claes Michielsz Bontenbal (1575–1623), Dutch civil servant involved in a conspiracy against Maurice of Orange
- Claes Borgström (1944–2020), Swedish lawyer and politician
- Claes Compaen (1587–1660), Dutch privateer, pirate, and merchant
- Claes Cronqvist (born 1944), Swedish former footballer
- Claes Cronstedt, Swedish lawyer
- Claes Dahlbäck (born 1948), Swedish businessman
- Claes Duyst van Voorhout (fl. 1638), Dutch brewer painted by Frans Hals
- Claes Egnell (1916–2012), Swedish sport shooter
- Claes Eklundh (born 1944), Swedish artist
- Claes Elefalk (born 1959), Swedish sports agent
- Claes Elfsberg (born 1948), Swedish television journalist
- Claes Elmstedt (1928–2018), Swedish politician
- Claes Eriksson (born 1950), Swedish director, actor, comedian and composer
- Claes Fellbom (1943–2024), Swedish director, writer and composer
- Claes Fornell, Swedish-born American entrepreneur
- Claes af Geijerstam (born 1946), Swedish musician, radio personality and DJ
- Claes Gill (1910–1973), Norwegian author, poet and actor
- Claes Hake (1945–2025), Swedish sculptor
- Claes Dirksz van der Heck (1595–1649), Dutch painter
- Claes Jacobsz van der Heck (1575–1652), Dutch painter
- Claes Hellgren (born 1955), Swedish handball player
- Claes van Heussen (1598–1633), Dutch still life painter
- Claes Hylinger (born 1943), Swedish novelist, essayist, poet and literary critic
- Claes Johanson (1884–1949), Swedish wrestler
- Claes Kronberg (born 1987), Danish footballer
- Claes Lang (1690–1761), Finnish painter
- Claes Loberg (born 1970), Swedish-born Australian technology entrepreneur
- Claes Malmberg (born 1952), Swedish former footballer
- Claes Malmberg (born 1961), Swedish actor and stand-up comedian
- Claes Pietersz van der Meulen (1642–1693), Dutch glass painter
- Claes Corneliszoon Moeyaert (1592–1655), Dutch painter
- Claes Nordén (born 1993), Swedish ice hockey player
- Claes Nordin (born 1955), Swedish badminton player
- Claes Oldenburg (1929–2022), Swedish-born American pop art sculptor
- Claes Pieterszoon (1593–1674), Dutch surgeon and mayor of Amsterdam
- Claes Rålamb (1622–1698), Swedish statesman
- Claes Roxbergh (born 1945), Swedish politician
- Claes G. Ryn (born 1943), Swedish-born American political scientist
- Claes Isaacsz Swanenburg (1572–1652), Dutch painter
- Claes Tholin (1860–1927), Swedish politician
- Claes Tornberg (born 1936), Swedish rear admiral
- Claes Uggla (1614–1676), Swedish military officer
- Claes Västerteg (born 1972), Swedish politician
- Claes Jansz Visscher (1587–1652), Dutch draughtsman, engraver, mapmaker and publisher
- Claes Wersäll (1888–1951), Swedish gymnast
- Claes Westring (1893–1975), Swedish diplomat
- Claës Ivar Wollin (1918–1999), Swedish diplomat

=== Claës ===
- Claës Fredrik Hornstedt (1758–1809), Swedish naturalist, taxonomist and illustrator
- Claës König (1885–1961), Swedish noble man and horse rider
- Claës Lindsström (1876–1964), Swedish vice admiral
- Claës Palme (1917–2006), Swedish maritime lawyer
- Claës Rundberg (1874–1958), Swedish sport shooter
- Claës Skoglund (1916–2008), Swedish major general
- Claës Axel Klingenstierna (1875–1966), Swedish major general

== Surname ==
Claes is the 7th most common surname in Belgium (16,840 people in 1998) and the most common surname in Belgian Limburg. In contrast, only 405 people have the surname in the Netherlands. People with the last name Claes include:

- Claes (surname)

== See also ==
- Clas (given name)
- Claus, given name and surname
- Klaas, given name and surname
- Nicholas
- Claas, German agricultural machinery manufacturer

=== Fictional ===
- Katarina Claes, main character of Japanese novel and anime series My Next Life as a Villainess: All Routes Lead to Doom!
