= Claessens =

Claessens is a Dutch patronymic surname meaning "son of Claes (Nicholas)". It may refer to:

- Alain Claessens (1947–2004), French actor
- Alec Claessens (born 2005), Belgian politician
- Artus Claessens (fl. 1625–1644), Flemish still-life painter
- August Claessens (1885–1954), American politician
- Benny Claessens (born 1981), Belgian theater and movie actor
- Dieter Claessens (1921–1997), German sociologist
- Dominicus Claessens (c. 1625 – c. 1690s), Flemish Baroque painter
- François Claessens (1897–1971), Belgian gymnast
- Gert Claessens (born 1972), Belgian footballer
- Jean Claessens (1908–1978), Belgian footballer
- Lambertus Antonius Claessens (1762–1830), Flemish engraver and publisher
- Nastja Claessens (born 2004), Belgian basketball player
- Olivier Claessens (born 1988), Belgian footballer
- Stijn Claessens (born 1959), Dutch economist
- Tony Claessens (born 1989), Dutch EDM producer better known as Tony Junior

== See also ==
- Claessen
