= Artus Claessens =

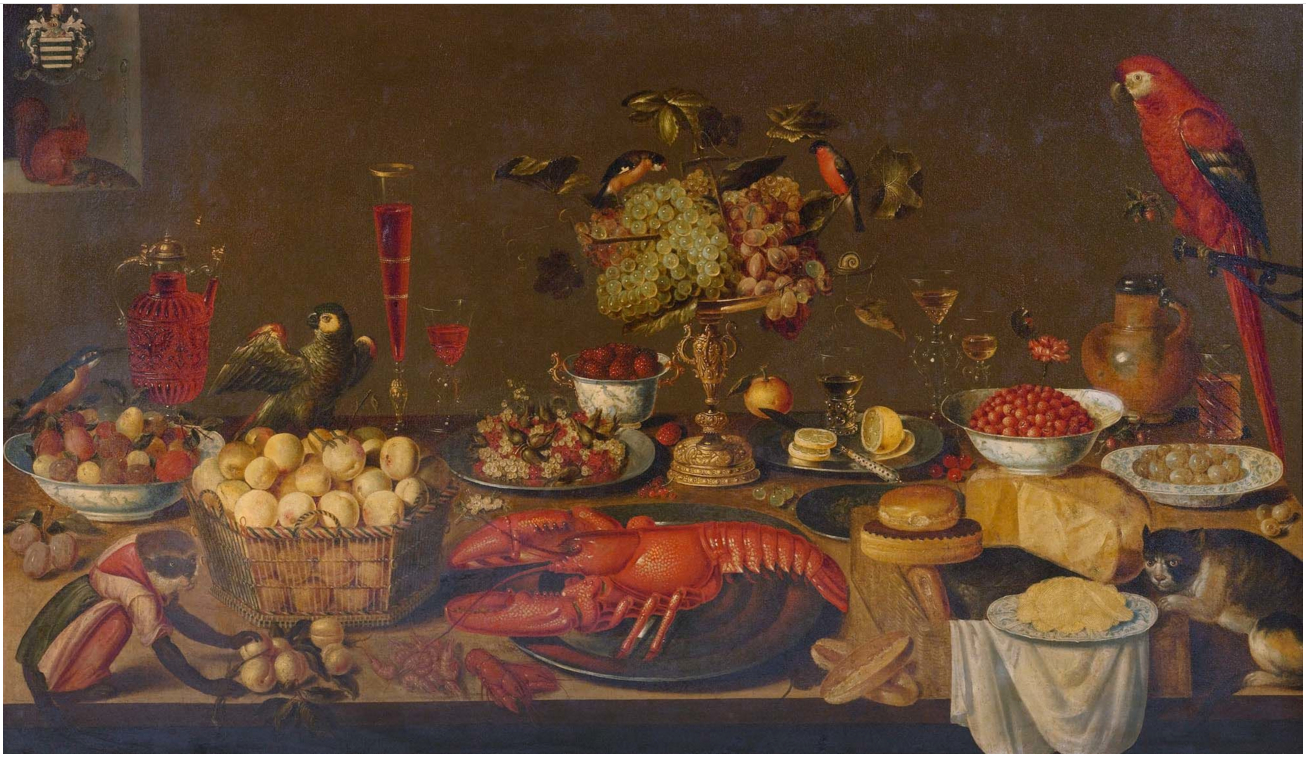
Large banquet still life with lobster, fruits, wine glasses, porcelain and pewter plates, birds, monkey, squirrel and cat

Artus Claessens (fl 1625–1644) was a Flemish Baroque still-life painter who is known for is opulent still lifes.

== Life ==
Very little is known about this artist. He was likely born in Antwerp where he is first mentioned on his registration as a member of the Antwerp Guild of Saint Luke in 1625. He was active in Antwerp until 1644. A fruit still life signed and dated 'AR. CLAESSENS 1644" (at gallery Leegenhoek in 1954) raises the suspicion that he was working elsewhere after his training in Antwerp.

== Work ==
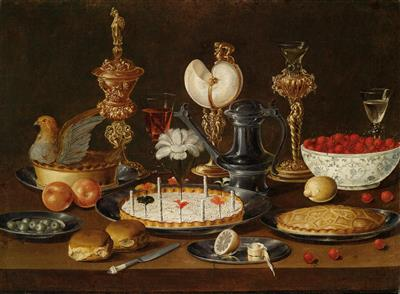
An opulent still life with a nautilus cup

The work of this obscure still life painter is not well known. The large formats of his still lifes suggest that he worked elsewhere (probably the Dutch Republic) after completing his training in Antwerp. His compositions typically depict a variety of fruits and other foods, decorative and glass vessels, as well as live animals such as squirrels, cats, birds and monkeys.

Stylistically his paintings are close to those of other Antwerp still life painters of his time such as Jacob van Hulsdonck, Osias Beert, Frans Snyders and Clara Peeters. His works have in the past frequently been mistaken for those of Clara Peeters as was the case with the Still Life of Fruit, a Lobster, Cheeses and Drinking Vessels with a Parrot and a Squirrel on a Table (Museum of Fine Arts, Budapest).
