= American Customer Satisfaction Index =

Economic indicator of consumer satisfaction in the US

The American Customer Satisfaction Index (ACSI) is an economic indicator that measures the satisfaction of consumers across the U.S. economy. It is produced by the American Customer Satisfaction Index (ACSI LLC) based in Ann Arbor, Michigan.

The ACSI interviews about 350,000 customers annually and asks about their satisfaction with the goods and services they have purchased and consumed. Respondents are screened to ensure inclusion of actual customers of a wide range of business-to-consumer products and services, including durable goods, services, non-durable goods, local government services, federal government services, and so forth. Customer satisfaction (ACSI) scores are released monthly throughout each calendar year. ACSI data is used by researchers, corporations, government agencies, market analysts and investors, industry trade associations, and consumers.

== History ==
ACSI began in 1994, developed by researchers with the National Quality Research Center at the University of Michigan, in cooperation with the American Society for Quality and CFI Group, Inc. The model was originally designed in 1989 for the Swedish economy (the Swedish Customer Satisfaction Barometer (SCSB)). Both the Swedish version and the ACSI were developed by Claes Fornell, Donald C. Cook Distinguished Professor Emeritus of Business Administration at the University of Michigan, and chairman of CFI Group.

== ACSI score calculation ==
A company's ACSI score is derived from three manifest variables (i.e. survey questions) within the ACSI questionnaire, each rated on a 1-10 scale by the respondents interviewed for that company, government agency, or other organization:

Manifest Variable	1	10
Overall satisfaction (X1)	Very dissatisfied	Very satisfied
Expectancy disconfirmation (X2)	Falls short of your expectations	Exceeds your expectations
Comparison to an ideal (X3)	Not very close to the ideal	Very close to the ideal

The 0-100 ACSI score is estimated using the mean for each variable from the n responses for that company (X1, X2, X3), along with the weights for each question as calculated within the ACSI structural equation model (W1, W2, W3):

(((X1*W1)+(X2*W2)+(X3*W3))-1)/9*100

== Sector, industry and company-level findings ==
ACSI data show that certain sectors, industries and companies have consistently high customer satisfaction, while others are almost always below average (with the National ACSI score reflecting the average). At the sector level, manufacturing — including both durable and non-durable goods — typically

Some industries that are measured performed well over the years in ACSI include: e-commerce, personal care products, soft drinks, beer, consumer electronics, automobiles and household appliances. Cable television, airlines and telecommunications usually have lower ACSI scores.

== Macroeconomic findings ==
One set of findings discovered by academic researchers involve predictions of macroeconomic growth as functions of changes in aggregate customer satisfaction. For example, ACSI is predictive of Gross Domestic Product (GDP) growth and Personal Consumption Expenditure (PCE) growth.

== Stock market findings ==
In a 2006 paper published in the Journal of Marketing, it was shown that a portfolio of stocks chosen based on their customer satisfaction outperformed the market. A 2016 article in the same journal, examining returns from a fund trading exclusively on ACSI data, found that strong satisfaction companies significantly outperformed the S&P 500 (518% to 31%) during the study period (2000–2014).

== International adoption of the ACSI model ==
Research groups, quality associations and universities in several countries are using the ACSI model to create customer satisfaction indices for their own national economies. The list of governments that have adopted the ACSI model include India, Saudi Arabia, Singapore, Dubai, Kuwait, South Africa, Honduras, Puerto Rico, and Colombia. The development of an international system of customer satisfaction measurement founded on a common methodology allows for comprehensive cross-national satisfaction benchmarking.

== ACSI licensees ==
In addition to ACSI LLC, CFI Group LLC is licensed to apply the methodology for individual companies. ACSI Funds, which manages an exchange-traded fund (ETF), uses ACSI data for trading under the ticker symbol "ACSI".
