= Ulf Linde =

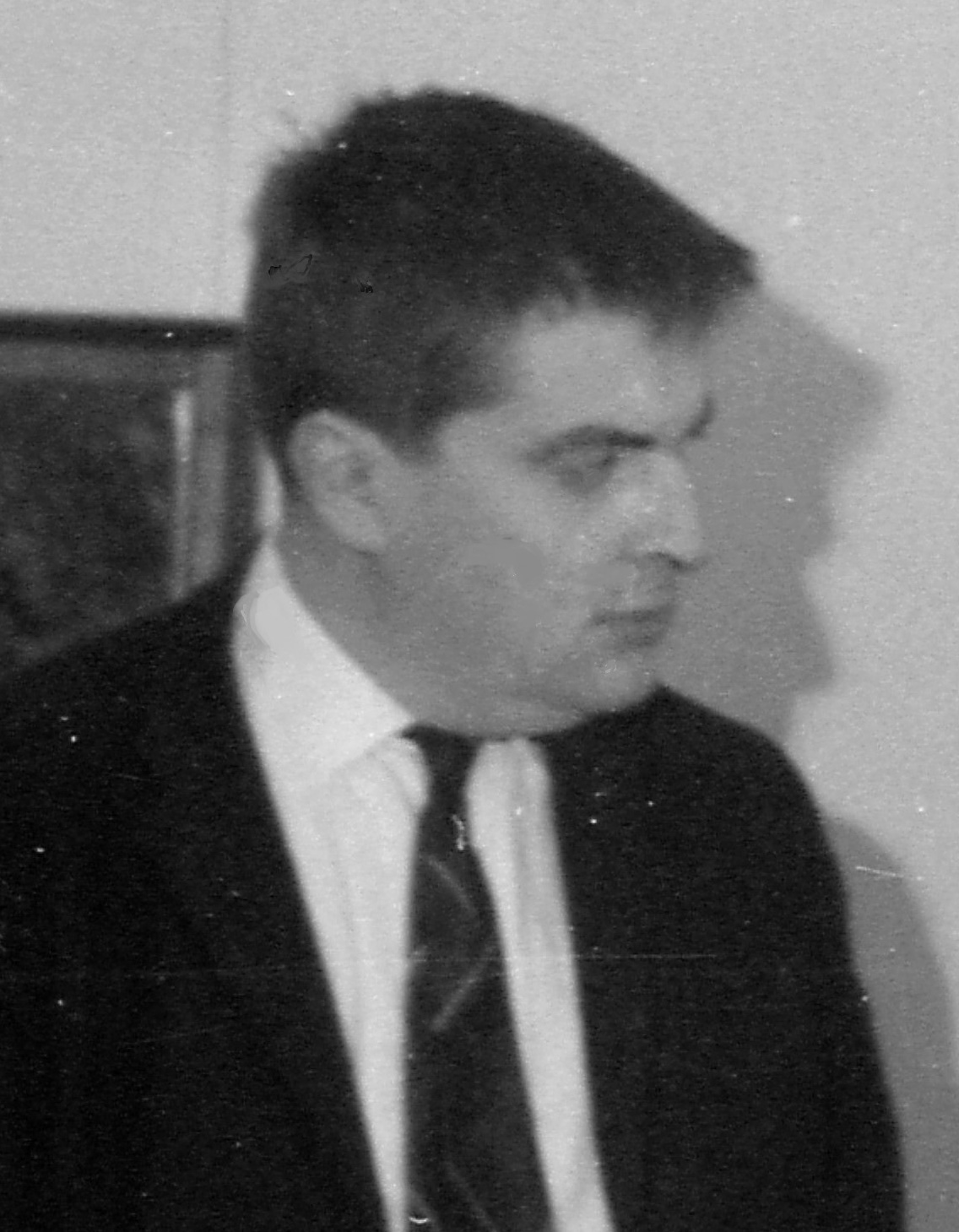
- Ulf Linde in 1960
- Born: Ulf Harald Linde; April 15, 1929; Stockholm, Sweden
- Died: October 12, 2013 (aged 84); Stockholm, Sweden
- Occupations: Art critic, museum director, jazz musician

Ulf Harald Linde (15 April 1929 – 12 October 2013) was a Swedish art critic, writer, jazz musician, museum director and a member of the Swedish Academy.

== Biography ==
Linde was born in the Östermalm district of Stockholm. Interested in jazz music from a young age, he started playing the trumpet in the late 1940s, but soon switched to vibraphone. Between 1948 and 1952 he played in the groups of Thore Jederby and Simon Brehm, and recorded together with musicians such as Arne Domnérus, Bengt Hallberg, and James Moody, as well as with groups led by himself.

After his musical career ended, Linde worked as an art critic for Dagens Nyheter between 1956 and 1968, then as a professor at the Royal Institute of Art until 1975, as chief curator at Moderna Museet in Stockholm from 1973 to 1976, and as director of the Thiel Gallery in Stockholm from 1977 to 1997. A prominent critic, his 1960 book Spejare ("Scout") had a large influence on the view of art in Sweden in the 1960s, and is mentioned as having "delivered an incendiary starting-point for an open concept of art based on the viewer’s active participation." Linde wrote over 30 books during his career, among them several monographs on artists and poets such as Pablo Picasso, Henri Matisse, Siri Derkert and Wallace Stevens. In 1961 and 1963, he produced a number of replicas of Marcel Duchamp's readymades for exhibitions at Moderna Museet; the replicas, which were signed by Duchamp, would later be used for a number of exhibitions around the world.

Linde was a member of the Royal Swedish Academy of Fine Arts from 1963. He was elected a member of the Swedish Academy on 10 February 1977 and admitted on 20 December 1977, succeeding the writer Eyvind Johnson to seat 11.

== Bibliography ==
- Ragnar Sandberg: 1944-55 (1955)
- Anteckningar om schweizerstilen (1959)
- Johan Krouthén 1858-1932 (Östergötlands och Linköpings stads museum, 1958)
- Spejare: en essä om konst (Bonniers, 1960)
- Lennart Rodhe (Bonniers, 1962)
- Marcel Duchamp (Galerie Burén, 1963)
- Siri Derkert (Bonniers, 1964)
- Fyra artiklar (Bonniers, 1965)
- Contreras: januari 1969 (Svensk-franska konstgalleriet, 1969)
- Geometrin i en målning av Piero della Francesca (Konstnärsbolaget, 1974)
- Eyvind Johnson: inträdestal i Svenska akademien (Norstedts, 1977)
- Rune Jansson, with Gérald Gassiot-Talabot (Atlantis, 1980)
- Claes Eklundh, with Ola Billgren (Kalejdoskop, 1981)
- Ulf Gripenholm (Galerie Belle, 1984)
- Harald Lyth: målningar 1980-1985 (Apoteksbolagets konstförening, 1985)
- Efter hand : texter 1950-1985 (Bonniers, 1985)
- Marcel Duchamp (Rabén & Sjögren, 1986)
- Kjell Anderson: målningar 1970-86 (Alba, 1986)
- Bo Trankell (Borås konstmuseum, 1986)
- Den sentimentale satyren: om Heidenstams Hans Alienus (Heidenstamsällskapet, 1987)
- Karl Axel Pehrson (Legenda, 1987)
- Bo Larsson (Författarförlaget, 1987)
- Mot fotografiet (Carlsson, 1989)
- Kjell Strandqvist (Galerie Aronowitsch, 1989)
- Olle Olsson Hagalund (Thielska galleriet, 1989)
- Ingemar Nygren (Thielska galleriet, 1990)
- Gripenholm eller Tolv variationer över ett tema av Basilius Valentinus (Apoteksbolagets konstförening, 1990)
- Olle Skagerfors: akvareller och teckningar (Uddenberg, 1991)
- Clinch, with Jan Håfström (Thielska galleriet, 1993)
- Rune Rydelius (Carlsson, 1996)
- John-E Franzén: målningar och teckningar, with Douglas Feuk (Raster, 1996)
- Lars Kleen: Konstruktionen/Constructions (Kunsthalle Düsseldorf, 1998)
- Svar (Bonniers, 1999)
- Ulf Gripenholm: målningar, teckningar, grafik (Almlöf, 2002)
- Jazz: kåserier i Orkesterjournalen 1950-1953 och två artiklar (Hjalmarson & Högberg, 2004)
- Edvard Munch och Thielska galleriet, with Arne Eggum (Atlantis, 2007)
- Hans Lannér (Carlsson, 2008)
- Från kart till fallfrukt: 70 korta kapitel om mitt liv et cetera (Bonniers, 2008)
- Sammelsurium (Bonniers, 2011)
- X-ets lustgård (Almlöf, 2012)

== Discography ==
- Jazz: 1948-1952 (Phontastic, 2004)

Cultural offices
Preceded by Eyvind Johnson	Swedish Academy, Seat No.11; 1977-2013	Succeeded by Klas Östergren
