= National Quality Research Center =

The National Quality Research Center (NQRC) at the Stephen M. Ross School of Business, University of Michigan, is a research and teaching center focusing on the measurement of customer satisfaction and the study of its relationships to quality, customer retention, and other variables, for both private and public sector organizations, and for national economies. First and foremost, the NQRC is responsible for the production of the American Customer Satisfaction Index (ACSI) as well as most of the research done using ACSI data.
