= Gillis van Hulsdonck =

Flemish painter

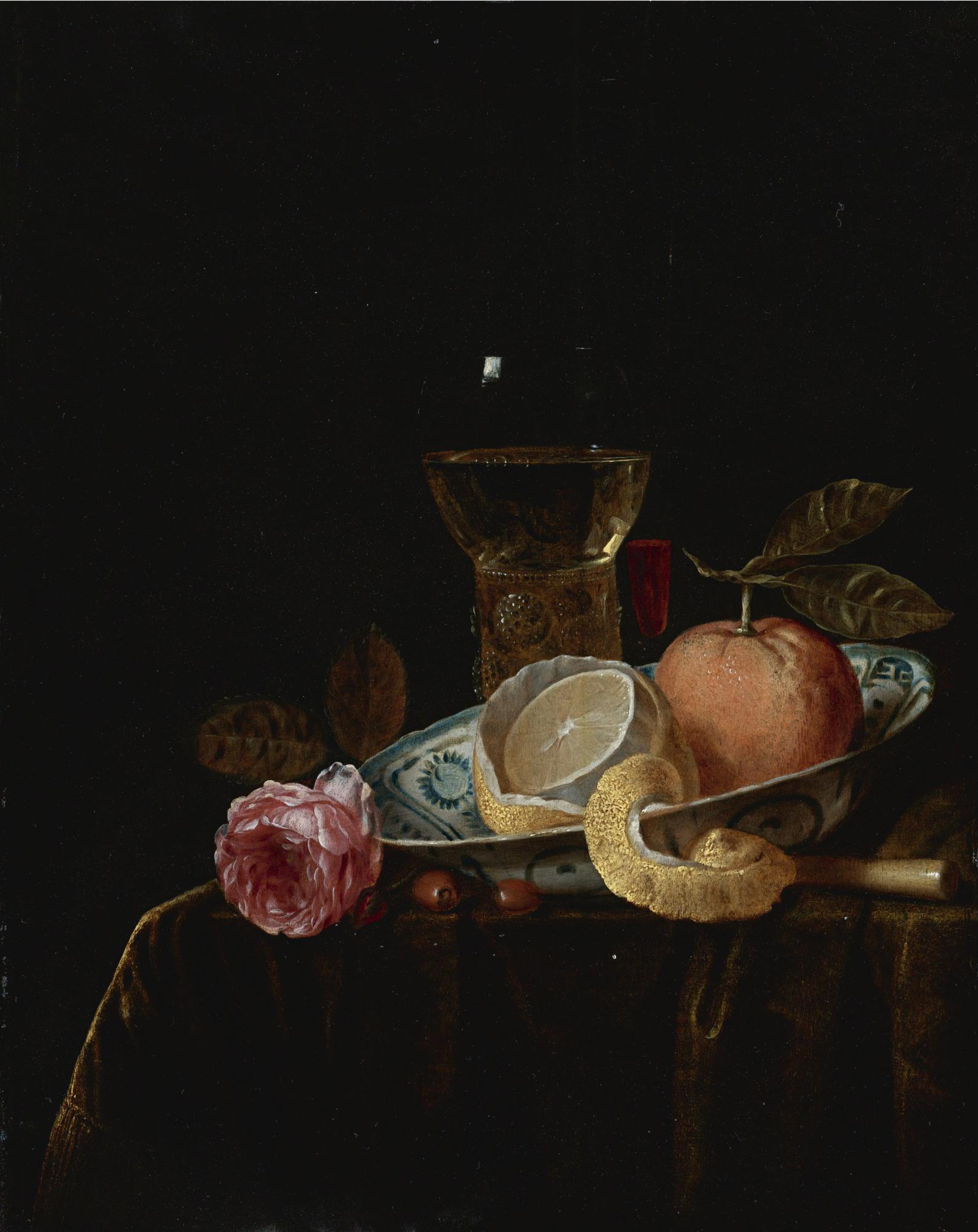
Still life with a peeled lemon and an orange in a bowl, a roemer, a wine glass and a rose on a draped table

Gillis van Hulsdonck or Gillis Jacobsz. van Hulsdonck (1625, in Antwerp – between 1676 and 1696, in Antwerp) was a Flemish still life painter. After training in Antwerp, he spent most of his active career in Amsterdam. He is known for his still lifes of fruit and banquet pieces.

== Life ==
Gillis van Hulsdonck was born in Antwerp as the son of Jacob van Hulsdonck and his first wife Maria la Hoes. His father was a prominent painter who played a role in the early development of the genre of still lifes of fruit, banquets and flowers and operated a successful workshop in Antwerp. Gillis trained with his father in his workshop. It is recorded that after his father died in early 1647, on 12 February of that year two guardians were appointed over the then already 21-year old Gillis. There is no record of Gillis joining the Antwerp Guild of Saint Luke. He is believed to have moved to Amsterdam some time after his father's death.

In Amsterdam he married Magdalena Davidt on 2 January 1655. The couple had six children. He likely returned to Antwerp with his family around 1670. On 27 March 1676 he and his wife (43 years old) attest that they know a certain Jan Pedro de Herde and that they had lived 'in Holland'. This is the last record about the artist. It is not known where and when he died. It was likely in Antwerp and no later than 1696.

== Work ==
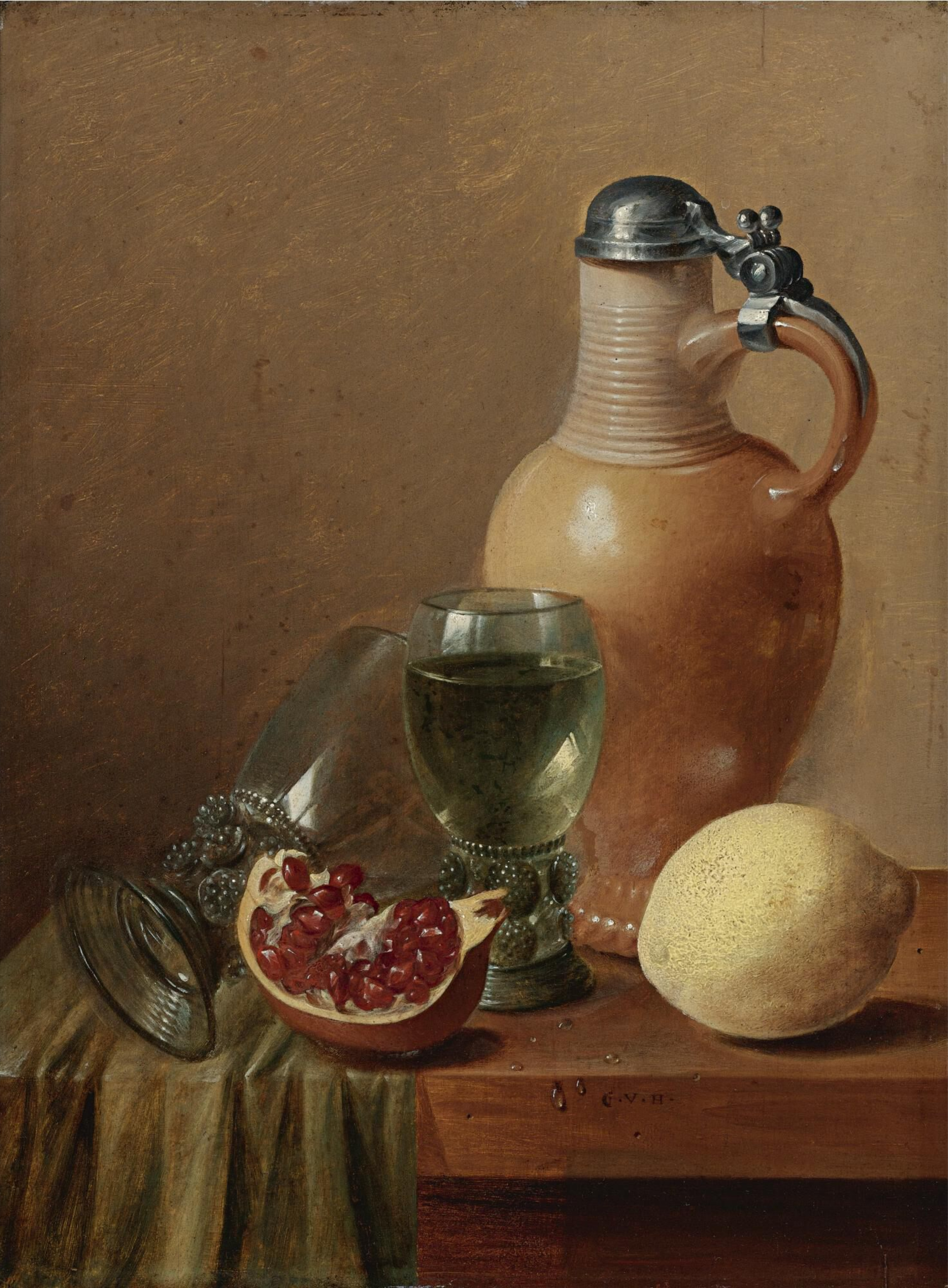
Still life with a jug and pomegranate

Van Hulsdonck is known for his fruit still lifes, banquet still lifes and pronkstillevens. Only a limited number of wholly or partially signed works by his hand are known. There exist some disagreements in the art historian community about attributions of works to him. Some of his works may have been wrongly included among the works of his father whose style he initially continued.

His later works are more reflective of the Dutch school of still life painting of his time, in particular Willem Kalf. However, in comparison to Kalf's paintings van Hulsdonck's brush stroke is soft and this gives all depicted objects an almost velvety surface. This softness of the objects is also enhanced by the painter's use of light and shadow, which is characterized by creamy reflections and softly flowing drop shadows. This gives his paintings an intimist quality.

Stylistically his work also shows the influence of the Dutch painter Simon Luttichuys . The theme of a lobster on a pewter plate, for example, appears in several paintings signed by or attributed to Luttichuys.
