= Classen Mansion =

Manor house in Helsingør, Denmark

Claessen Mansion
- Det Claessenske Palæ
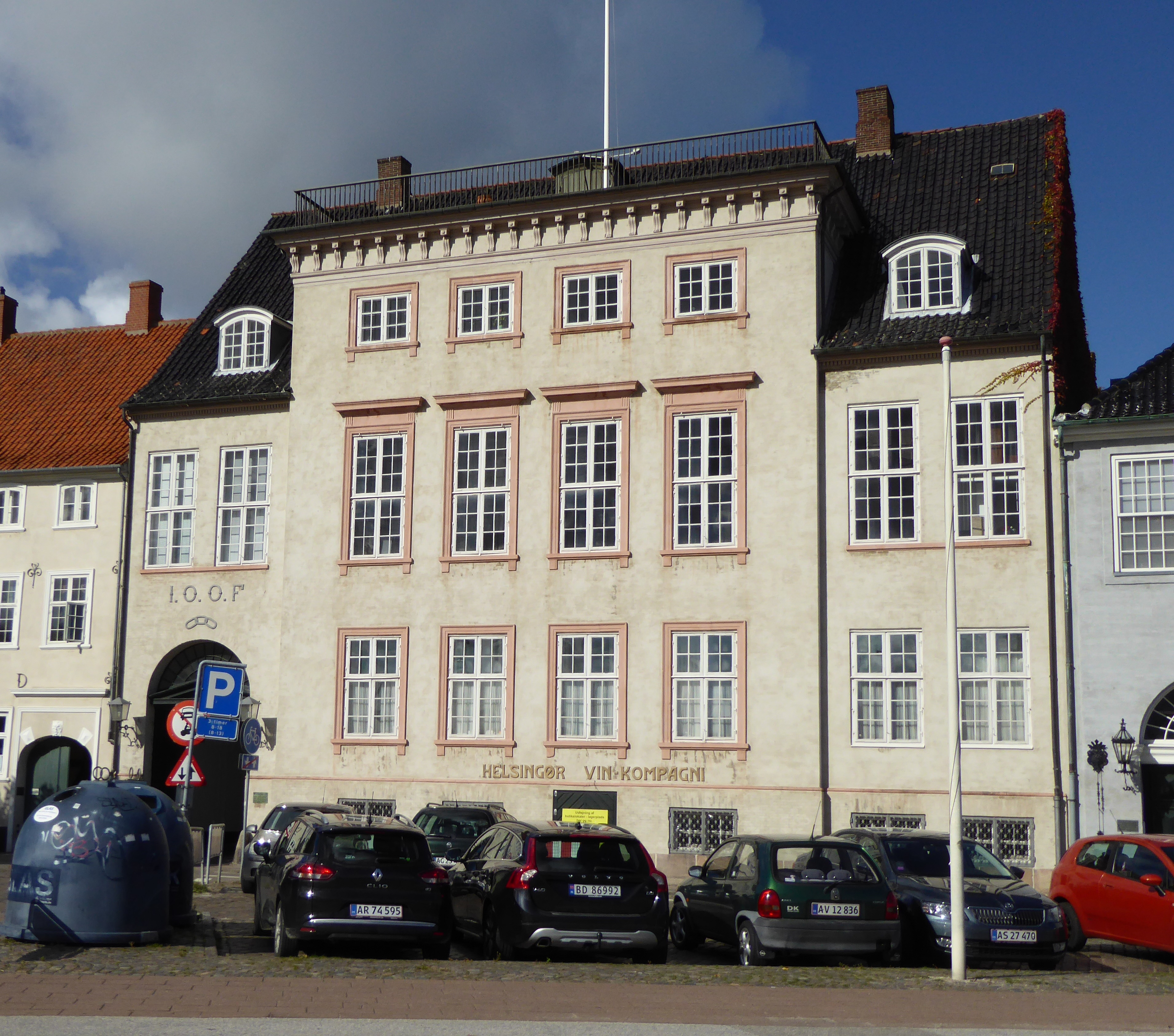
- The main entrance on Havnepladsen
- Interactive map of the Claessen Mansion area

General information
- Architectural style: Neoclassical
- Location: Helsingør, Denmark
- Coordinates: 56°2′5.57″N 12°36′54.98″E
- Construction started: 1791
- Inaugurated: 1793

The Classen Mansion (Danish: Det Classenske Palæ) is a Neoclassical manor house situated on Strandgade in Helsingør, Denmark. It was built for a prosperous businessman in the 1790s and now houses the local Odd Fellows Lodge. The house overlooks Helsingør's harbourfront at Wibroes Plads and is flanked by Skibsklarerergaarden to the left and the Stephan Hansen Mansion to the right.

== History ==
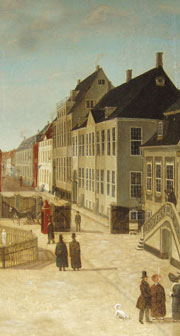
Toldkammerpladsen, the building shown in a painting from the late 18th century

One of Helsingør's largest merchant houses, a four-winged complex with timber framing, was formerly located at the site.

In 1785, it was acquired by Jean Jacob Claessen (1752–1806), a wealthy merchant, shipowner and ship handler (Skibsklarerererg). The property was located next to the home of his uncle and business partner Jean Christopher van Deurs (1725–1781), whose father, Arent van Deurs, had founded a trading firm in which Classen's father Andreas Classen (Claesen, 1712–1783) had become a partner. Classen's moither (Andreas Classen's wife) Charlotte Sophie van Deurs (1723–1773) was Jean Christopher van Deurs's sister. The company was now continued by the two neighbours under the name Arent van Deurs Enke / Co. (Arent van Deurs' Eidow & Co. Classen charged the prominent architect Caspar Frederik Harsdorff (1735– 1799) with the design of a new building for the site. It was constructed in . The balcony at the top of the building was used as a lookout. This position ensured the best view for lookouts to spot approaching ships on the Øresund. A row of houses was at Classen's time located on the other side of the street, blocking the view of the sea from the lower floors. They did not disappear until a fire in 1938.

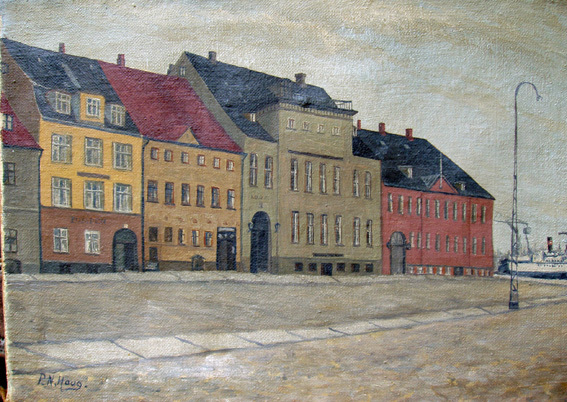
The Classen Mansion in 1039.

The situation for the shipping business changed dramatically after the turn of the century following the onset of the French Revolutionary Wars and Denmark's conflict with Britain. Classen's widow ran the company after his death in 1806 but the times did not improve and it went bankrupt in 1816. Classen's son-in-law, Christian Borries, managed to save part of the activities in Salig Arendt van Deurs enke og Co which survived the abolition of the Sound Dues in 1857, but his two sons had to close it in 1862.

In 1827, the house was sold to the merchant P. Chr. Schierbeck. In 1857 it was acquired by the trading company Fenwick & Co., which had formerly been based at Strandgade 85–87. It was then sold to the merchant C.V. Ulstrup before it was acquired by Landmandsbanken in 1904. Later tenants have included the local pilot services, a travel agent and a wine company. The local Odd Fellows Lodge has used the building since 1995.

== Architecture ==
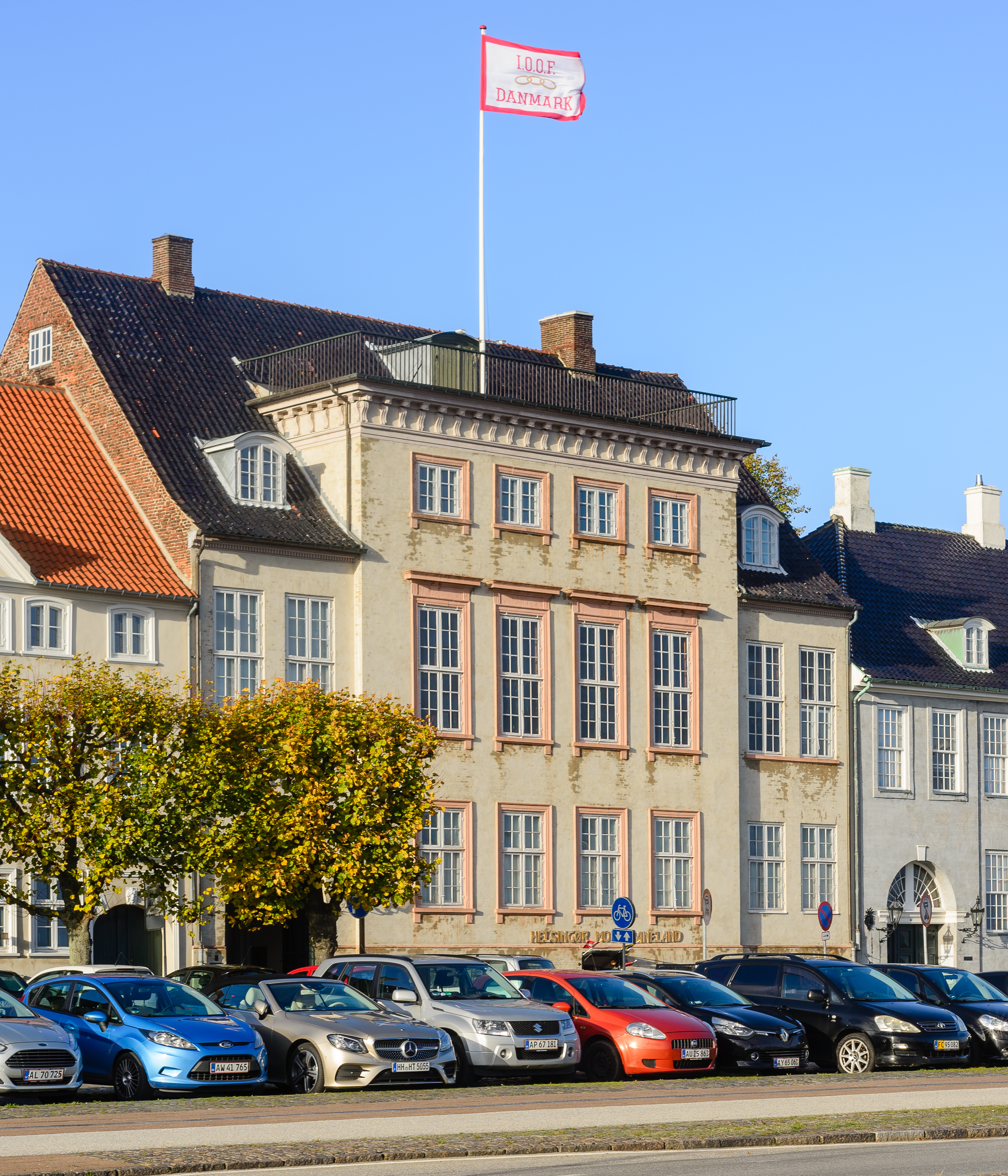
Det Classenske Palæ

The Neoclassical main wing is eight bays wide and consists of two storeys and an elevated cellar. A four bay central projection rises in a wall dormer topped by a roof terrace. The façade has few decorations. It is likely that it originally stood in blank, red brick similar to that on the building's rear. Part of the foundation and vaulted cellar may date from the older building or alternatively some of the bricks from that house may have been reused.

== Cultural references ==
In his 1923 novel Erik Gudmand, Alexander Svedstryp described the everyday life of a bourgeois family in the house in the 19th century.
