= Claes Fornell =

American business researcher

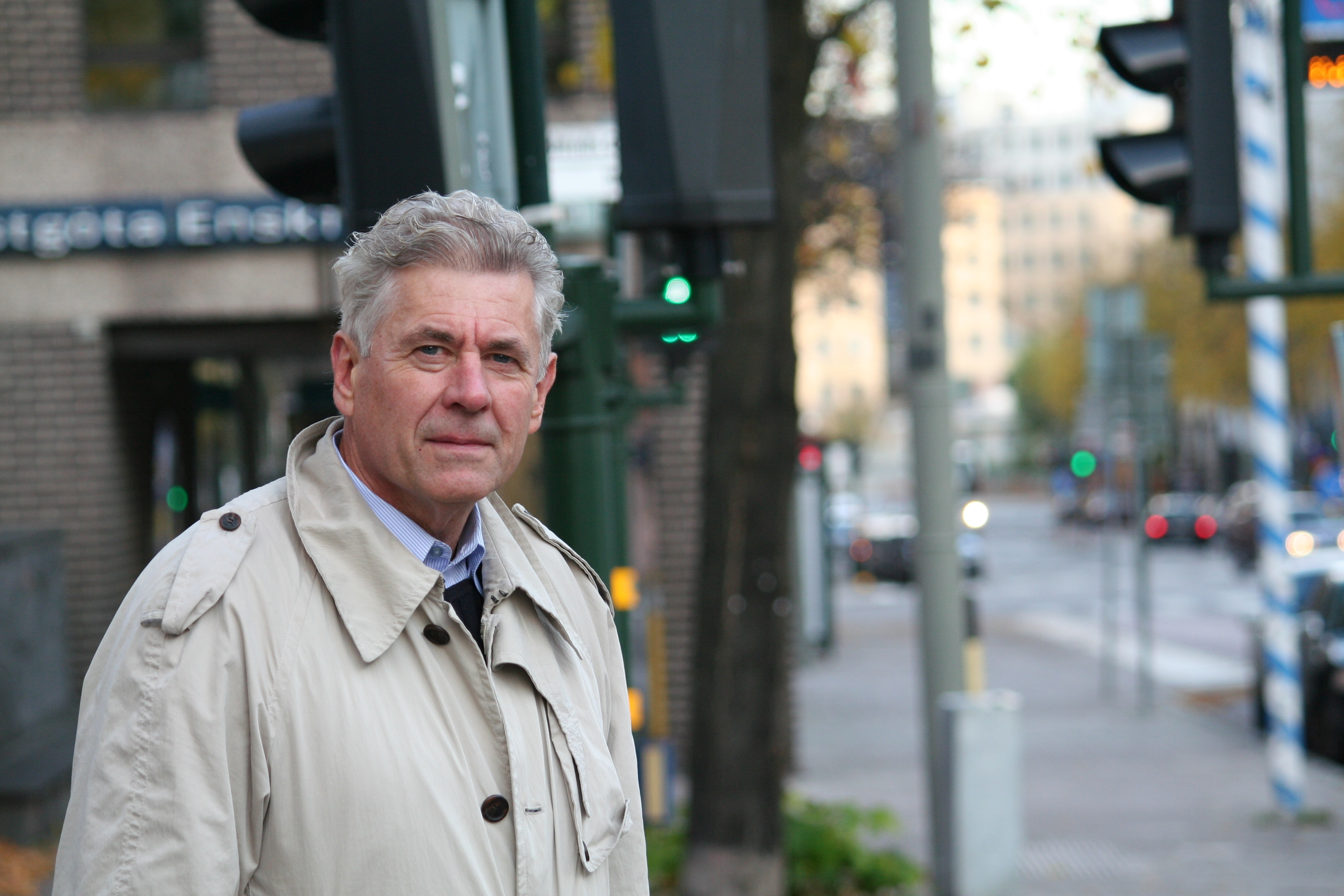
Claes Fornell

Claes Fornell is an expert on customer satisfaction analytics and capital asset management.

== Background ==
Born in Sweden in 1947, Claes Fornell received a Doctorate of Economics in 1976 from Lund University, Sweden. He is The Donald C. Cook Distinguished Professor Emeritus of Business Administration at the Stephen M. Ross School of Business, University of Michigan. Professor Fornell has also been on the faculty of Duke University, Northwestern University, the Stockholm School of Economics and INSEAD. In 2009, at the 100-year anniversary of the Stockholm School of Economics, Fornell was awarded an Honorary Doctorate of Economics. He also holds honorary professorships from Renmin University (2005) and Tianjin University (2007).

== Research and writing ==
Fornell's research centers on the development and application of advanced quantitative methods for understanding how to obtain high financial returns and lower risk at the same time. It was the convergence of these interests that led Fornell, in 1994, to found the American Customer Satisfaction Index (ACSI) – a monthly economic indicator of the quality of economic output, as experienced by the users of that output. ACSI is a predictor of consumer spending and economic growth at the macro level, along with a variety of company-level financial performance metrics, and tracks customer satisfaction for more than 400 companies. ACSI scores are predictive of return on investment, net cash flow, and stock returns. The ACSI technology, for which Fornell was awarded a US patent (US 8,666,515 B2) in 2014, has been used in many countries in addition to the United States, including Australia, China, Finland, France, Germany, Great Britain, India, Italy, the Netherlands, Singapore, South Africa, South Korea, Spain, Sweden, Switzerland, the United Arab Emirates (Dubai), and others.

Claes Fornell is the lead author of several articles linking customer satisfaction to stock returns, demonstrating that portfolios of firms with high ACSI scores consistently outperform the market. He has also written several books. Among them are Consumer Input for Marketing Decisions (Praeger, 1976), A Second Generation of Multivariate Analysis (Praeger, 1980), The Satisfied Customer: Winners and Losers in the Battle for Buyer Preference (Palgrave Macmillan, 2007), and The Reign of the Customer: Customer-Centric Approaches for Improving Satisfaction (Springer 2020). According to the "International Journal of Research in Marketing,"

== Business ==
Claes Fornell is the founder and chairman of CFI Group, an international consulting firm specializing in assisting companies with measuring and optimizing customer satisfaction for improved consumer utility and company financial return. He is also the founder of American Customer Satisfaction ETF (Ticker: ACSI) that invests in public companies with strong customer satisfaction, and Detroit Vineyards, a winery with a pedigree dated to 1702 when Antoine de la Mothe Cadillac established the first vineyard in Detroit.
