= Brocken (South Georgia) =

Brocken (54°29′S 36°4′W) is a mountain rising over 610 metres (2,000 ft) close southwest of Calf Head on the north side of South Georgia. It was named by the German group of the International Polar Year Investigations, 1882–83, after the Brocken, the highest mountain in central Germany.
