= Amalie Claussen =

Danish photographer (1859–1950)

Amalie Claussen, also Emma Claussen, (1859–1950) was a Danish photographer from the far north of Jutland. After first working as a teacher, she took up photography in the mid-1890s to satisfy her artistic ambitions. She is remembered for the portraits and landscapes she took while working in Skagen.

== Early years and education ==
Born on 9 November 1859 in Ugilt near Hjørring, Claussen was the daughter of the forester Henrich Wilhelm Claussen and his wife Ane Hedevig Cortsen. She grew up near the village of Børglum between Hjørring and Frederikshavn as her father worked on the Børglum Abbey estate.

Claussen showed an early interest in art, sketching scenes of the surrounding countryside from the age of eight. After her father died when she was 14, she was inspired to start writing poetry in a collection she titled Gisninger (Conjectures) in which she documented her religious and existential ideas. She completed her education at a teachers training college for women in Copenhagen.

== Career ==
In the mid-1880s, she opened a school in Frederikshavn but soon afterwards went to Vienna to study painting. In her late twenties, she became interested in hypnotism and spiritism. As a result, she published a number of religious works including Mit Livssyn (My Outlook on Life, 1905) and En ny Reformation (A New Reformation, 1925).

On returning from Vienna, she worked as a photographer in Aarhus for a short period but then went to Norway to study parapsychology. In the mid-1890s, she returned to Denmark, where she turned to photography, opening first a studio in Brønderslev and then from 1897 in Skagen where she took portraits of both the town's residents and its summer visitors. She also took a number of landscape photographs of Skagen and the surroundings, demonstrating her artistic talents. Working in a remote corner of Denmark, she also carried out the technical processing work as well as framing. Claussen worked full-time as a photographer until 1929 when she retired to Frederikshavn, where she lived in a house on the coast. She died there on 4 January 1950.
