= Claes Nordén =

Swedish ice hockey player

- Born: February 21, 1993 (age 32) Linköping, Sweden
- Height: 6 ft 0 in (183 cm)
- Weight: 174 lb (79 kg; 12 st 6 lb)
- Position: Right wing
- Shoots: Left
- SHL team: Linköpings HC
- Playing career: 2011–present

Claes Norden (born February 21, 1993) is a Swedish professional ice hockey player. He currently plays for Linköpings HC of the Swedish Hockey League. He previously played with Mora IK of the HockeyAllsvenskan (Swe.1).
