= George Claassen =

South African academic and journalist

- Born: 1949 (age 76–77)
- Occupations: Journalist, Writer, Academic
- Parent(s): Petronella Claassen (née Theunissen); George Nicolaas Claassen
- Relatives: Wynand Classen (Brother)
- Awards: SAASTA South African Science Communicator of the Year Award

Academic background
- Education: PhD
- Alma mater: University of Pretoria (BA, MA); UNISA (PhD)

Academic work
- Institutions: Beeld; HSRC; Pretoria Technikon; Stellenbosch University; Die Burger; Media24; SABC
- Notable ideas: Founder of Sceptic South Africa
- Writing career
- Occupation: Journalist
- Notable works: Geloof, bygeloof en ander wensdenkery (on beliefs); Kwakke, kwinte & kwale (on quackery)
- Website: George Claasen on CENSCOM

George Claassen is a South African journalist who was the head of department of journalism at Pretoria Technikon (now Tshwane University of Technology) and Stellenbosch University. Claassen was the first academic in the field of journalism to develop a course in science and technology journalism in Africa and can rightly be called the "father of science communication in Africa"

== Education and career ==
Claassen studied at the University of Pretoria where he completed his BA, B.Hons and MA, and attained a PhD at University of South Africa after research in Flanders about the literary works of the Flemish author Marnix Gijsen (pseudonym of Dr Jan-Albert Goris).

His book, Historiese Blik op die Lae Lande (Historical Overview of the Low Countries), was published in 1981. He was co-editor of a book on linguistic variations of Afrikaans, Taalverskeidenheid - 'n Blik op die Spektrum van Taalvariasie in Afrikaans, published in 1983 by Human & Rousseau Academica.

He was a founding editorial member of the now defunct Afrikaans daily Beeld in 1974, where he worked as a journalist in various positions as general, political, arts, science and sports reporter. After four years as sociolinguistics researcher at the Human Sciences Research Council, he joined the Department of Journalism at Pretoria Technikon, where he was Head of the Department from 1989 until 1992. Between October 1993 and the end of January 2001 he was Professor and Head of the postgraduate Department of Journalism at Stellenbosch University in the Western Cape. There he established the first course in science and technology journalism at an African university, and a course in media ethics.

He was science editor for the Afrikaans daily newspaper, Die Burger, in 2001 and in 2002 he became the internal ombudsman of the newspaper. He was also a deputy editor of the newspaper until 2008. In 2008, Claassen was appointed as ombudsman for Media24 Community Press. In 2018 he became public editor (ombudsman) for News24, South Africa's largest online news site. Since 2013, he has been a board member of the Organization of News Ombuds and Standards Editors (ONO).

Claassen was the founding director of the Centre for Science and Technology Mass Communication (CENSCOM) at the University of Stellenbosch in 2015 and between 2012 and 2023 he was a science correspondent for the SABC's Afrikaans radio station RSG. His book based on his weekly column on science at Die Burger, was published in 2008: Geloof, Bygeloof en Ander Wensdenkery was published by Protea Boekhuis and became a South African bestseller.

He has presented numerous courses in science and technology journalism for UNESCO in Nairobi, Addis Ababa, Pretoria and at Stellenbosch. In 2013, he designed a course in Science and Technology Journalism at the request of UNESCO, a course used widely in Africa. The rationale behind the course is that, in general, journalists are not trained for the task of presenting news and information about the rapidly advancing field of science. He also developed modules for the BPhil and Honours programmes on media ethics and media management.

In 1988, Claassen was a research fellow in journalism at the University of Wisconsin in Madison where he studied the US media's reflection of South Africa in the last years of apartheid. His book on quackery and pseudoscience in the South African media, Kwakke, Kwinte en Kwale - Hoe 'n Onsinverklikker jóú Lewe kan red, was published in 2014. In 2017, he was again based at the same university studying pseudoscientific phenomena and quackery in the media.

He organised the first international conference on quackery and pseudoscience, which was held in Stellenbosch in 2017.

=== Criticism of Leon Rousseau's work ===
As science editor at Die Burger, published in Cape Town, he wrote a weekly column on science, "Wetenskap vandag" (Science Today). His review of Leon Rousseau's Die Groot Avontuur (The Big Adventure), a book on evolution, sparked an intense debate in Afrikaans newspapers for his criticism of Rousseau's superficial knowledge of science. The eminent evolutionary scientist, Prof. Phillip Tobias, wrote an "Avant Propos" for Rousseau's book but when Claassen's main criticism of the book that it supported the idea of evolution by Intelligent Design was pointed out to Tobias, he recanted and distanced himself unequivocally from the Intelligent Design parts of the book in a letter published in Die Burger. Tobias observed to Claassen that he did not have access to the full manuscript before publication, a fact that was also pointed out by other scientists used and misquoted by Rousseau and his publishers to market the book.

== Recognition ==
- In May 2007 Claassen was the first winner of the SAASTA South African Science Communicator of the Year Award, presented by the National Science and Technology Forum.
- He was awarded the inaugural Media Lifetime Achievement Award by Stellenbosch University in 2019.

== Selected publications ==
=== Books ===
Claassen is the author or co-author of 14 books, including Geloof, Bygeloof en Ander Wensdenkery – Perspektiewe oor Ontdekkings en Irrasionaliteite (Faith, Superstition and Other Wishful Thinking – Perspectives on Discoveries and Irrationalities) that was published by Protea Boekhuis in July 2007 and in February 2008 went into a second printing. In 2014, his book on quackery, Kwakke, Kwinte & Kwale: Hoe 'n Onsinverklikker Jou Lewe Kan Red was released.

His works include:

- 'n Historiese Blik op die Lae Lande, HAUM, 1982
- Claassen, George (1983). "Taalverskeidenheid: 'n blik op die spektrum van taalvariasie in Suid-Afrika". In Kotze, D.A. (ed.). Development policies and approaches in Southern Africa (in Afrikaans). Pretoria: Academica. ISBN 978-0-86874-158-1. OCLC 10518354.
- Claassen, G. N. (1988). When beggars die. Boordfontein South Africa: Baobob. ISBN 978-0-620-12273-3. OCLC 22609675. (This historical novel was on the Beeld topseller's list in 1988)
- Claassen, George (2007). Die groot aanhalingsboek (in Afrikaans). Kaapstad: Human & Rousseau. ISBN 978-0-7981-4813-9. OCLC 180051507.
- Claassen, G. N. (2007). Geloof, bygeloof en ander wensdenkery : perspektiewe op ontdekkings en irrasionaliteite (in Afrikaans). Pretoria: Protea. ISBN 978-1-86919-144-3. OCLC 179773900.
- Claassen, George (2014). Kwakke, kwinte & kwale : hoe 'n onsinverklikker jou lewe kan red (in Afrikaans). Observatory: XLibris. p. 128. ISBN 978-0-9814168-9-2. OCLC 885298767.

=== Articles ===
Claassen is a peer-reviewed social scientist on subjects such as the media and science communication and his research has been published in science journals such as Ecquid Novi, the Tydskrif vir Geesteswetenskappe, Journal of Science Communication, Communicatio, Current Allergy & Clinical Immunology, Historia, and others. He has also published chapters in various books on the media and science communication.

=== Social media ===
Claassen was active on a blog called Prometheus Unbound (hosted on WordPress) and from 2009 on a blog called Prometheus Liberated, however both are now defunct.

== Personal life ==
Claassen's parents were Petronella Claassen (née Theunissen) and George Nicolaas Claassen, a schoolmaster from Middelburg Hoërskool and South African athlete who won the 1961 Comrades Marathon. He is one of four children, the others being Danie, Maryna and Wynand, who captained the Springboks in the 1980s.

Claassen is married and has three children.
