= Claas Hugo Humbert =

German scientist and writer (1830–1904)

Claas Hugo Humbert (5 August 1830, in Bielefeld – 26 May 1904) was a German scientist and writer.
