= Klaas de Vries =

Klaas de Vries may refer to:

- Klaas de Vries (Christian Democratic Appeal) (1917–1999), Dutch politician
- Klaas de Vries (Labour Party) (born 1943), Dutch politician
- Klaas de Vries (composer) (born 1944), Dutch composer
