= William Claussen House =

Historic house in Iowa, United States

- U.S. National Register of Historic Places
- Location within Iowa Location within the United States
- Location: 2215 W. 2nd St. Davenport, Iowa
- Coordinates: 41°31′15″N 90°36′40″W
- Area: less than one acre
- Built: 1855
- Architectural style: Greek Revival
- MPS: Davenport MRA
- NRHP reference No.: 83002412
- Added to NRHP: July 7, 1983

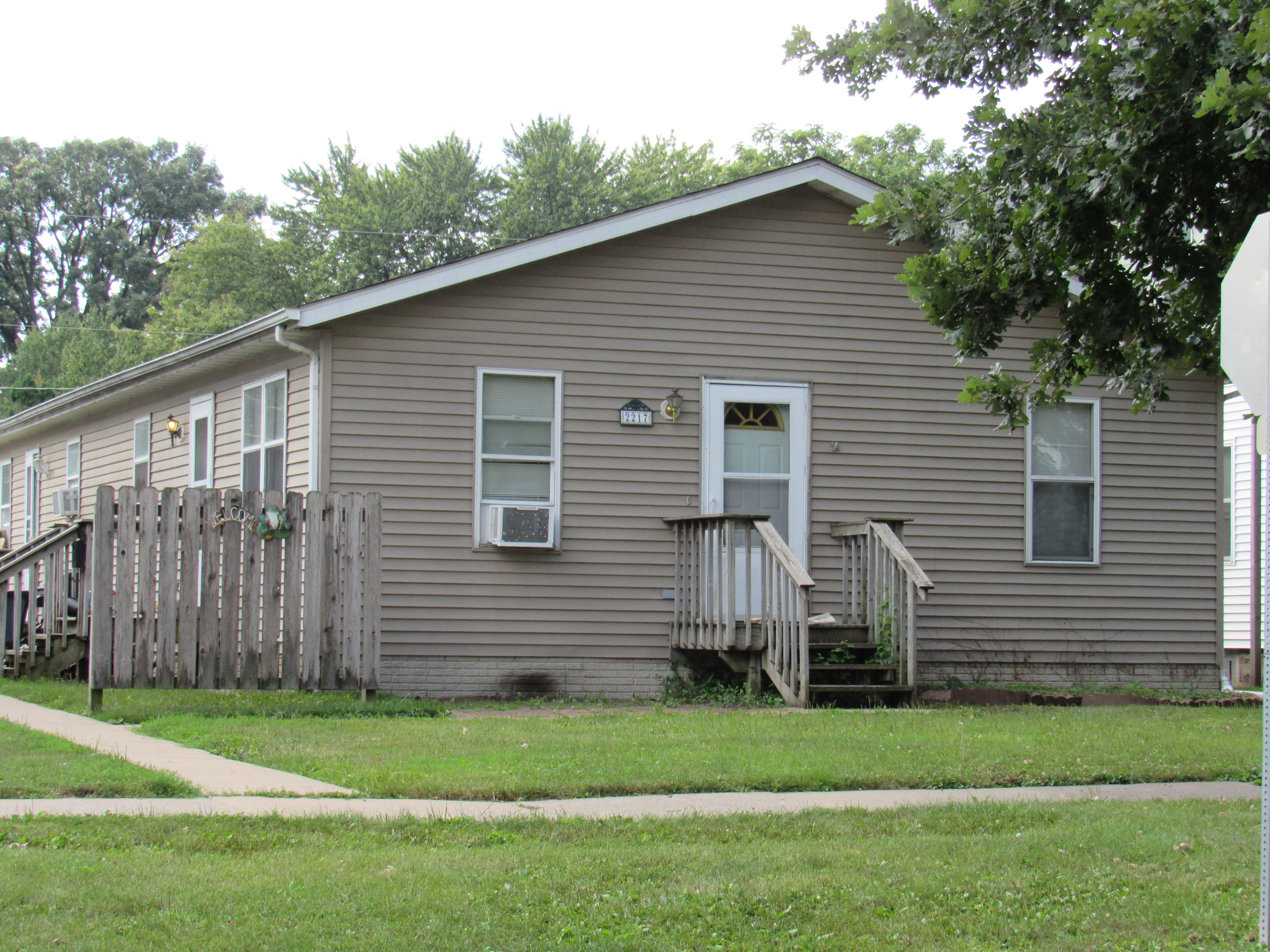
The Claussen House was located where this house now stands.

The William Claussen House was a historic building located in the West End of Davenport, Iowa, United States. The Greek Revival style house was built in 1855 and it was listed on the National Register of Historic Places since 1983. It has subsequently been torn down and replaced by a single-story house.

== History ==
The original builder of this house cannot be determined. William Claussen lived here from 1888 until around 1915. He worked as a local dealer in coal, lime, cement, and drain tile.

== Architecture ==
The house was an example of a popular form found in the city of Davenport: two-story, three–bay front gable, with an entrance off center and a small attic window below the roof peak. This house had a simplified classical pediment, which was accomplished by attaching a single molding strip to the wall parallel at the edge of the roof. The molding featured a decorative element from the Italianate style, bracketed eaves. A small columned porch with a flat roof completed the front. Another architectural element to the house was a bay window that was featured in the middle of the east side of the house.
