= Alain Claessens =

French actor

Alain Claessens (14 August 1947 – 2 September 2004) was a French actor.
