= Claes van Heussen =

Dutch Golden Age painter

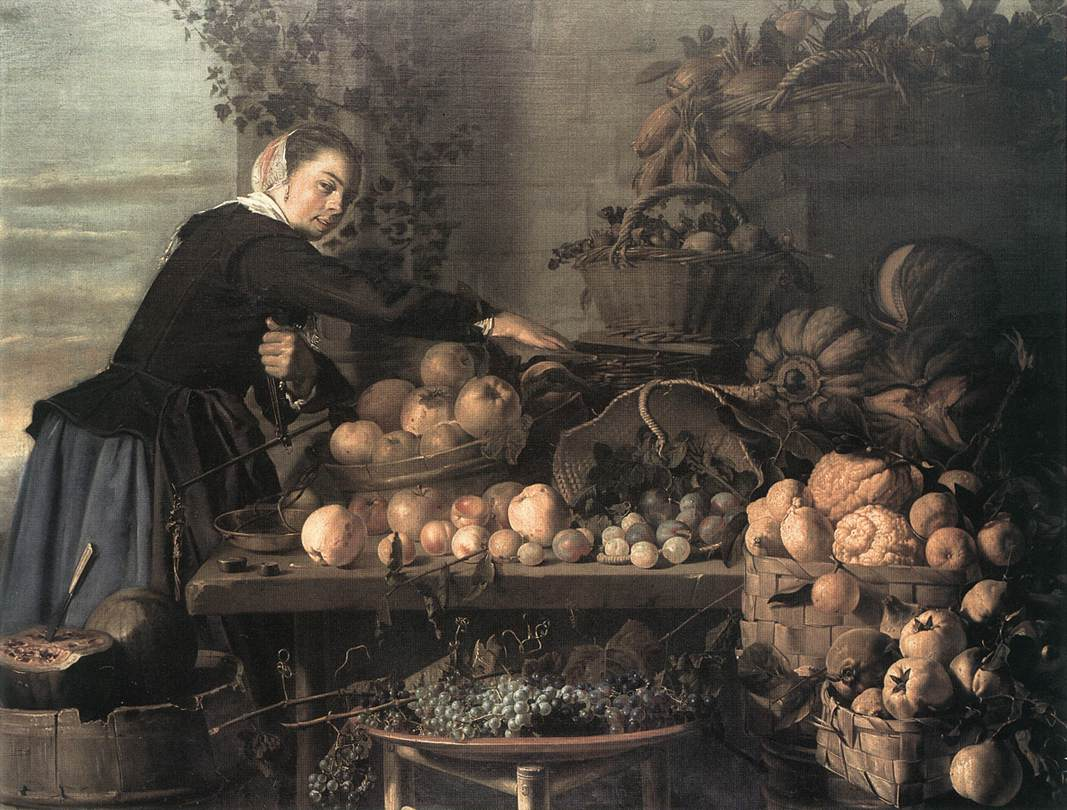
Fruit and vegetable seller, 1630. The woman on the left is by Frans Hals.

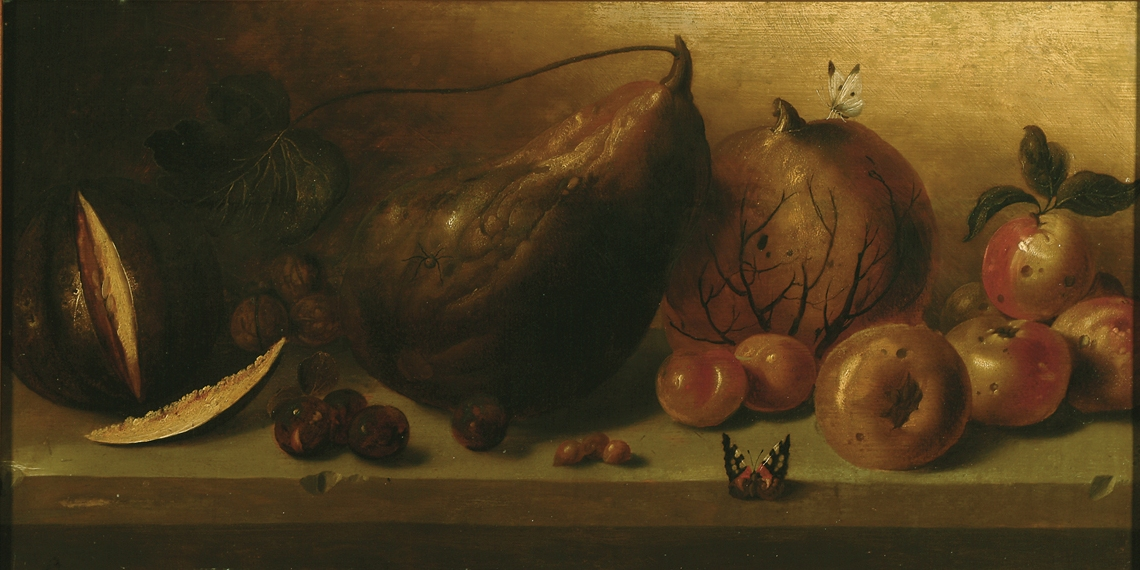
Still life with fruit and butterflies

Claes van Heussen (1598 – 1633, Haarlem), was a Dutch Golden Age still life painter who died young.

== Biography ==
According to the RKD he was a still life painter whose birthplace is unknown. He is known for a few fruit still lifes and vanitas pieces during a very short period in Haarlem. He was first registered in Haarlem in 1625, and in 1631 he declared he was 32, and in 1633 his wife is mentioned in a document as a widow. One of his market scenes is adorned with the figure of a young woman reaching in a basket, that was painted by Frans Hals. In the notes on town meetings in the archives of the Haarlem Guild of St. Luke under April 4, 1633, the surgeon Jan Snijder and Pieter Jansz Saenredam declared to the mayors of Haarlem that all paintings on a list belonged to the estate of Claes van Heussen, in the name of his widow. Van Heussen was listed in the guild, but without noting the year of membership.

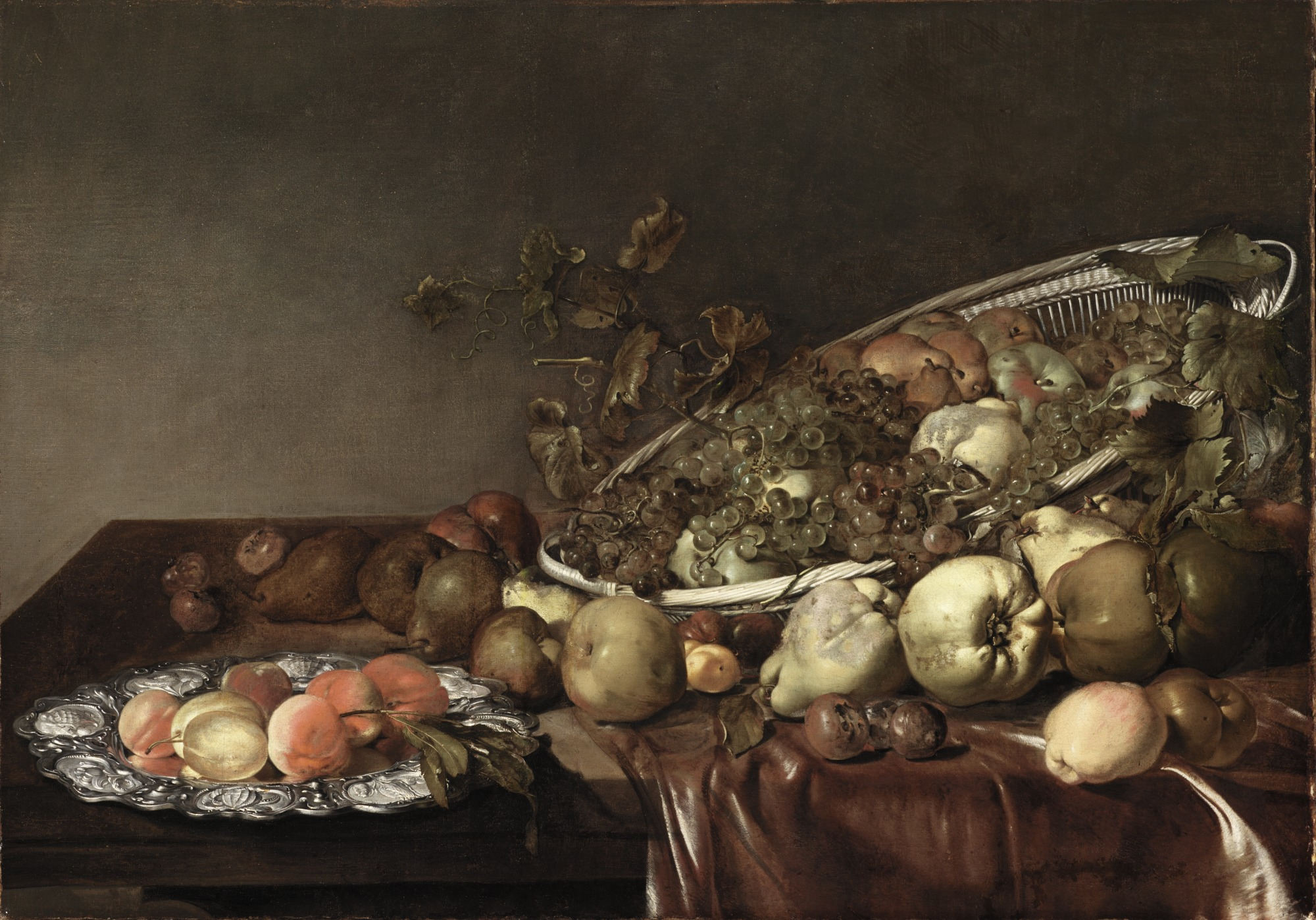
Still life with fruit, 1630 - Detroit Museum of Art
