= Claussen's Bakery =

- U.S. National Register of Historic Places
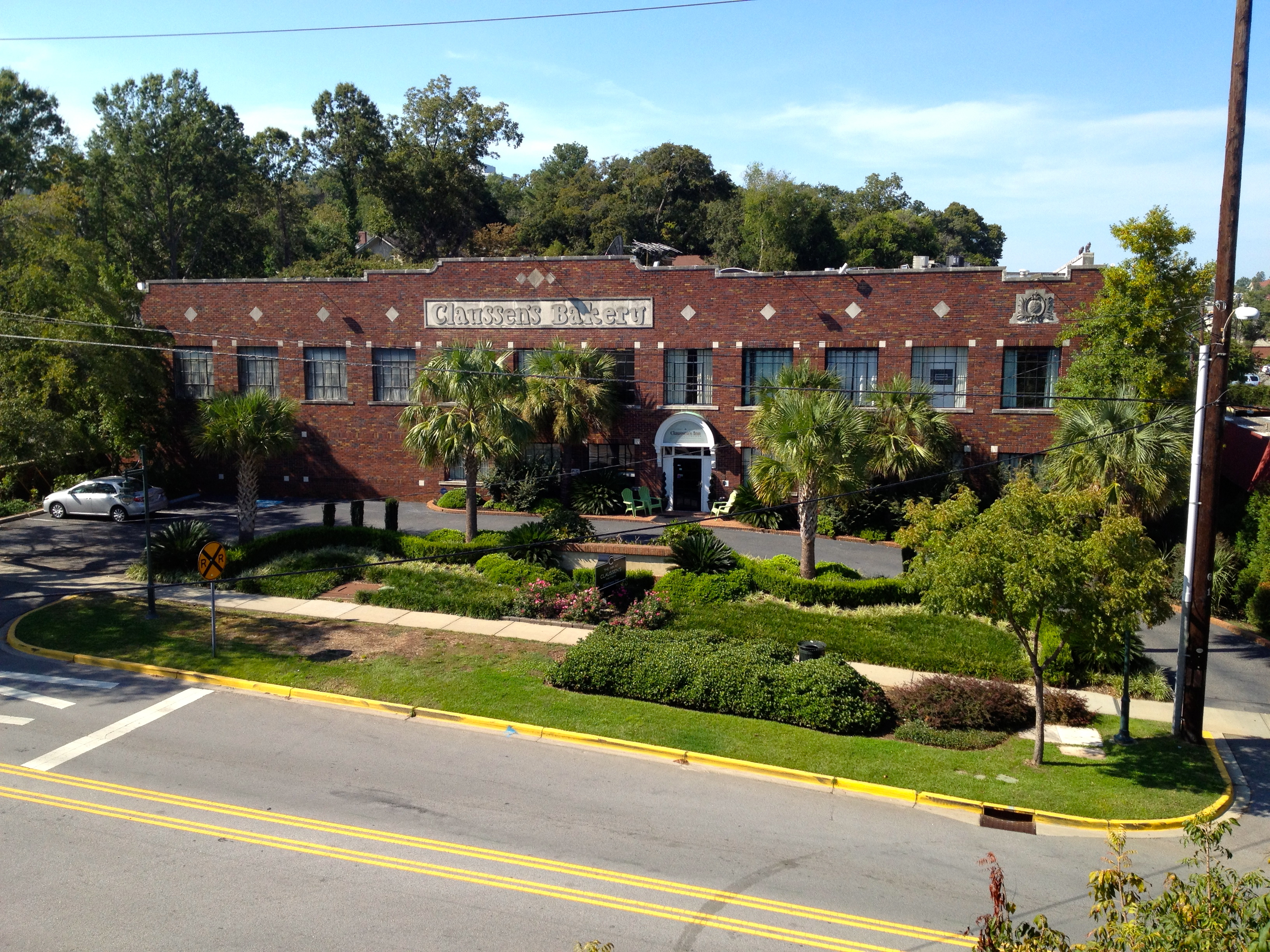
- Claussen's Inn, September 2012

- Location within South Carolina Location within the United States
- Location: 2001-2003 Green St., Columbia, South Carolina
- Coordinates: 34°0′1″N 81°1′5″W
- Area: 1.9 acres (0.77 ha)
- Built: 1928
- MPS: Columbia MRA
- NRHP reference No.: 87000401
- Added to NRHP: March 9, 1987

Claussen's Bakery, also known as Claussen's Inn, is a historic commercial bakery located at Columbia, South Carolina. It was built in 1928, and is a two-story, trapezoidal plan, brick building that contains a total of 25,000 square feet. The Columbia bakery ceased operating in 1963. It was later converted to a boutique hotel.

It was added to the National Register of Historic Places in 1987.
