= Klaasen =

Klaasen is Dutch patronymic surname ("son of Klaas"). Notable people with this name include:

- Berton Klaasen (born 1990), South African rugby union player
- Heinrich Klaasen (born 1991), South African cricketer
- Jelle Klaasen (born 1984), Dutch darts player
- Lorraine Klaasen (born 1957), South African/Canadian musician, daughter of Thandi Klaasen
- Luc Klaasen (born 1958), Dutch bassist known by his pseudonym Luc Ex
- Raven Klaasen (born 1982), South African tennis player
- Robert Klaasen (born 1993), Dutch footballer
- Davy Klaassen (born 1993), Dutch footballer
- Thandi Klaasen (1931–2017), South African musician, mother of Lorraine Klaasen

== See also ==
- 16958 Klaasen, a Mars-crossing asteroid
- Jan Klaasen, the Dutch puppet version of Pulcinella (Mister Punch)
- Claassen
- Klaassen
- Klassen
