= Eduard Klassen =

Paraguayan harpist

Eduard Klassen is a Paraguayan folk harpist of Mennonite descent, now living in Canada.

== Life and musical career ==
Eduard Klassen was born in an isolated and Plautdietsch-speaking Mennonite community of the Paraguayan Chaco. He has stated the closest city would be 508 km away and the first time he saw a paved road was by the age of 15 years. 1975 he started playing the harp, which became his passion. His pursue of formal musical training brought him to the Paraguay's capital city Asunción, where he studied for 5 years.

Becoming a Born again Christian by the age of 20 he decided to offer his music to service God. He has since appeared in churches of most denominations, banquets, fundraisers as well as upscale concerts, radio and TV-shows like 100 Huntley Street. To date he has performed in over 4500 concerts in 40 countries throughout the world.

His recorded work collects 24 albums so far. Furthermore 4 video recordings released on DVD and a book of memoirs titled The Harpist - A Soulful Journey.

Eduard Klassen currently lives in Stratford, Ontario, Canada. He is married to Christine, with whom he has two sons named Mathias and Sheldon.

== Discography ==
- Christian Instrumental Music, Volume 3: How Great Thou Art.
- Christian Instrumental Music, Volume 4: Amazing Grace.
- Christian Instrumental Music, Volume 5: Christmas.
- Christian Instrumental Music, Volume 6: Latin American Favourites.
- Christian Instrumental Music, Volume 7: Be Still And Know.
- Christian Instrumental Music, Volume 8: This is My Father’s World.
- Christian Instrumental Music, Volume 9: Because He Lives.
- Christian Instrumental Music, Volume 10: Christmas Melodies.
- Christian Instrumental Music, Volume 11: Great Is Thy Faithfulness.
- Christian Instrumental Music, Volume 12: Melodies For The Heart.
- Christian Instrumental Music, Volume 17: Christmas In The Country.
- Christian Instrumental Music, Volume 19: Hymns On The Harp.
- Christian Instrumental Music, Volume 20: Timeless Hymns.
- Christian Instrumental Music, Volume 21: Hymns - Precious Memories
- Christian Instrumental Music, Volume 22: Songs We Love
- Christian Instrumental Music, Volume 23: Hymns of Worship
- Concert Album: The Music.
- Concert Album: Country And Blue Grass Gospel Classics.
- Concert Album: Timeless Hymns. (with Christine Klassen)
- Favourite Folk Melodies.
- Great Hymns Of Faith.
- He Touched Me. Southern Gospel Classic.
- Rock Of Ages.
- South American Classics.
