= Werner Klaas =

German footballer

Personal information
- Date of birth: 10 May 1914
- Place of birth: Olpe, Germany
- Date of death: March/April 1945 (aged 30)
- Place of death: Czechoslovakia
- Position: Defender

Senior career*
Years	Team	Apps	(Gls)
- Militär SV Koblenz

International career
1937	Germany	1	(0)
- * Club domestic league appearances and goals

Werner Klaas (10 May 1914 – between 30 March and 4 April 1945) was a German international footballer.

== Personal life ==
Klaas served as an Oberleutnant (senior lieutenant) in the German Army during the Second World War. He was killed in action on the Eastern Front between 30 March and 4 April 1945.
