= Clason =

Clason is a Germanic patronymic surname derived from the given name Clas. Notable people with the surname include:

- Charles R. Clason (1890–1985), Republican member of the United States House of Representatives
- Curt Meyer-Clason
- George Samuel Clason (1874–1957), American finance and investment writer
- Hugo Clason (1865–1935), Swedish sailor
- Isak Gustaf Clason (1856–1930), Swedish architect
- Jesse Clason (1860–1918), American physician and politician
- Oliver B. Clason
- Patrick Clason
