= Classon's Bridge =

Bridge over the River Dodder in Ireland

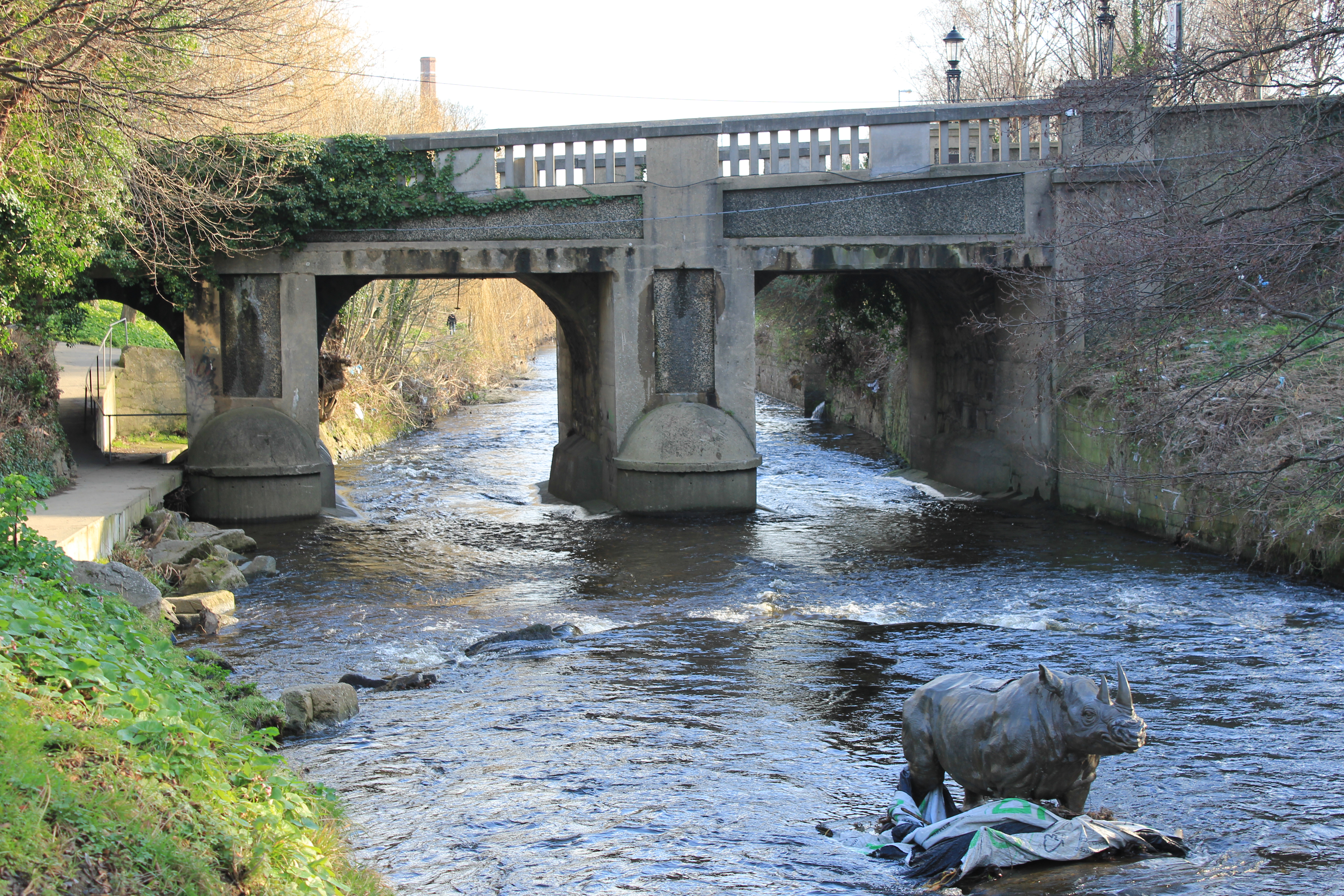
- Classon's seen from upstream on the left bank.
- Coordinates: 53.307935°N 6.254403°W
- Crosses: River Dodder

Characteristics
- Material: Granite and concrete (1928)
- No. of spans: 3

History
- Construction end: c1790s. Widened in 1928.

Classon's Bridge (Irish: Droichead Classon) is a bridge over the River Dodder in Dublin, Ireland between Milltown and Dartry. The bridge is part of the Lower Churchtown Road (L3001) and has an underpass for pedestrians walking along the banks of the Dodder.

== History ==
The bridge takes its name from John Classon, the owner of a mill, who built the bridge in order to aid his business which was located on the left bank of the river, now the location of The Dropping Well pub.

Before Classon's Bridge was constructed, in the late 18th century, the only means of crossing the River Dodder in the area included a ford and narrow bridge at Milltown (the latter being too narrow for vehicles).

The bridge was made from granite blocks on the riverbed. In 1928, the bridge was widened but parts of the old bridge can still be seen underneath. A little upstream from the bridge is a statue of a rhino in the middle of the river.
