= Jacob van Hulsdonck =

Flemish painter (1582–1647)

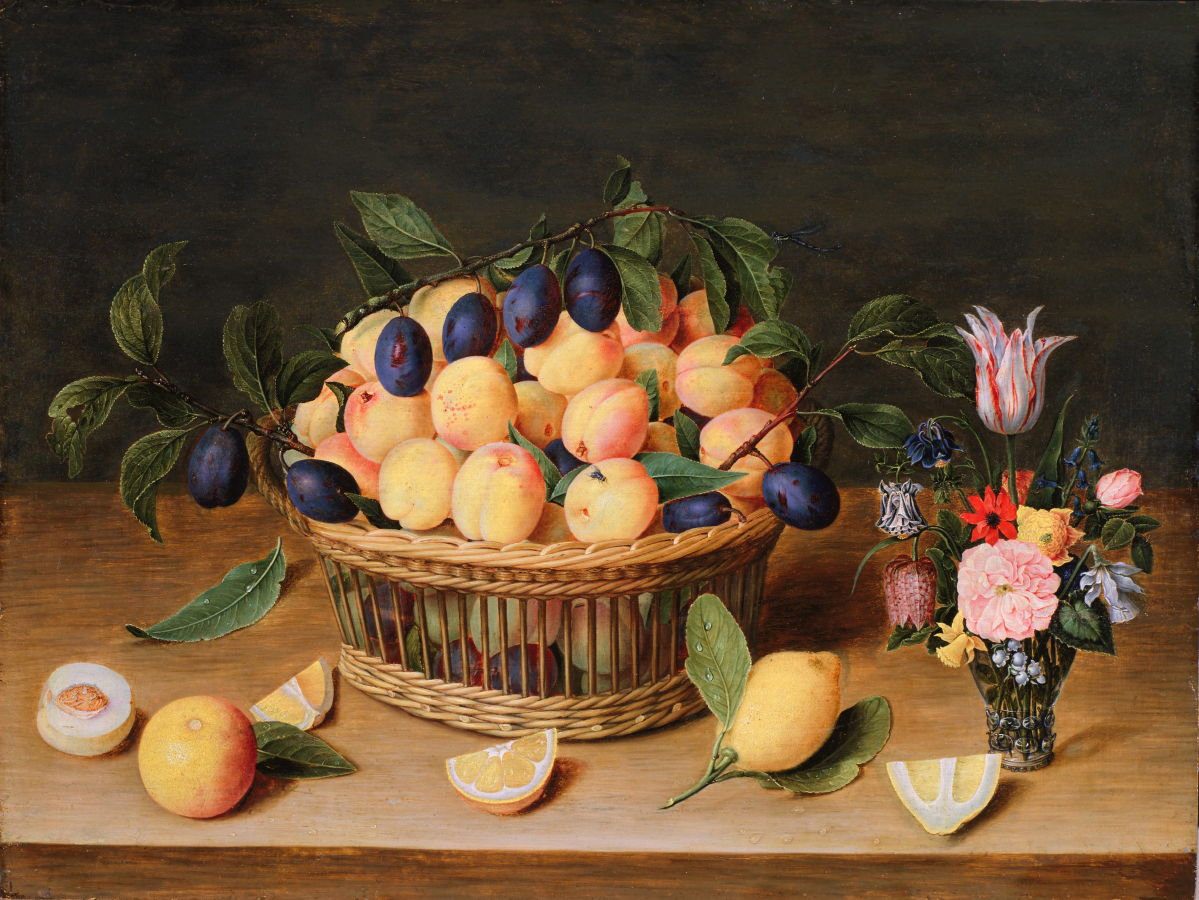
Still Life with Fruit and Flowers

Jacob van Hulsdonck or Jan van Hulsdonck (1582, Antwerp – 1647, Antwerp), was a Flemish painter who played a role in the early development of the genre of still lifes of fruit, banquets and flowers.

== Life ==
Jacob van Hulsdonck was born in Antwerp in 1582. He moved to Middelburg at a young age and there he likely received at least part of his training. The prime still life painting studio in Middelburg was that of Flemish émigré Ambrosius Bosschaert. Although it is believed van Hulsdonck did not train with Bosschaert he may have been an early influence on his work.

By 1608 van Hulsdonck had returned to Antwerp as is documented by the record of his admission as a master of the Antwerp Guild of Saint Luke that year. The following year he married Maria la Hoes and moved into the house that remained his residence for the rest of his life. The couple had seven children.

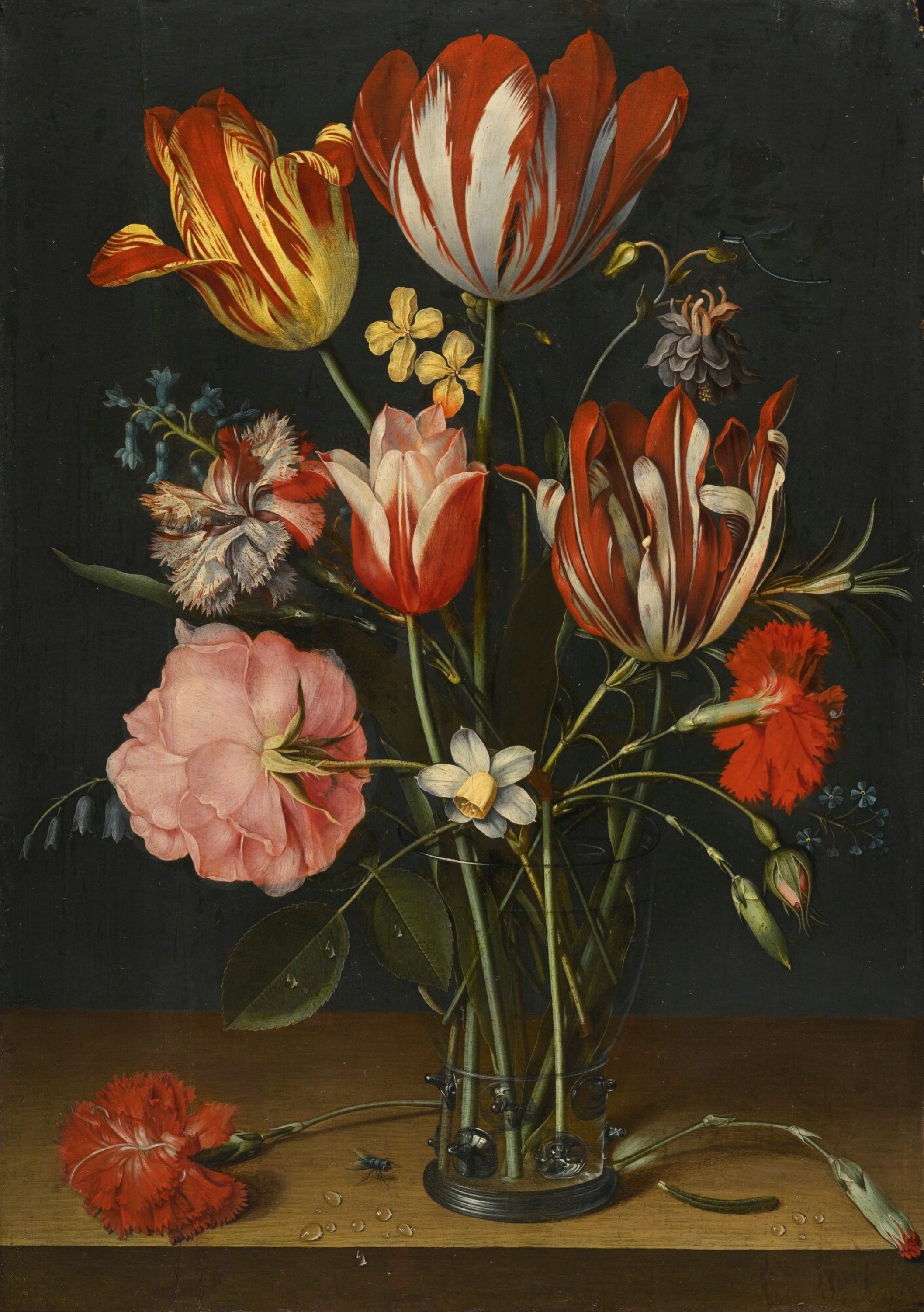
Still life of tulips, carnations, a rose and other flowers

Jacob van Hulsdonck was the teacher of his son Gillis who later worked for a long period as a still life painter in Amsterdam.

== Work ==
=== General ===
Jacob van Hulsdonck was a still life painter of banquet style pieces, fruit bowls and flowers. Roughly 100 paintings are currently attributed to him. The meticulous handling of detail in his work likely explains his relatively low output. More than half of his paintings are signed with his characteristic full signature in capitals while some are signed with a monogram only.

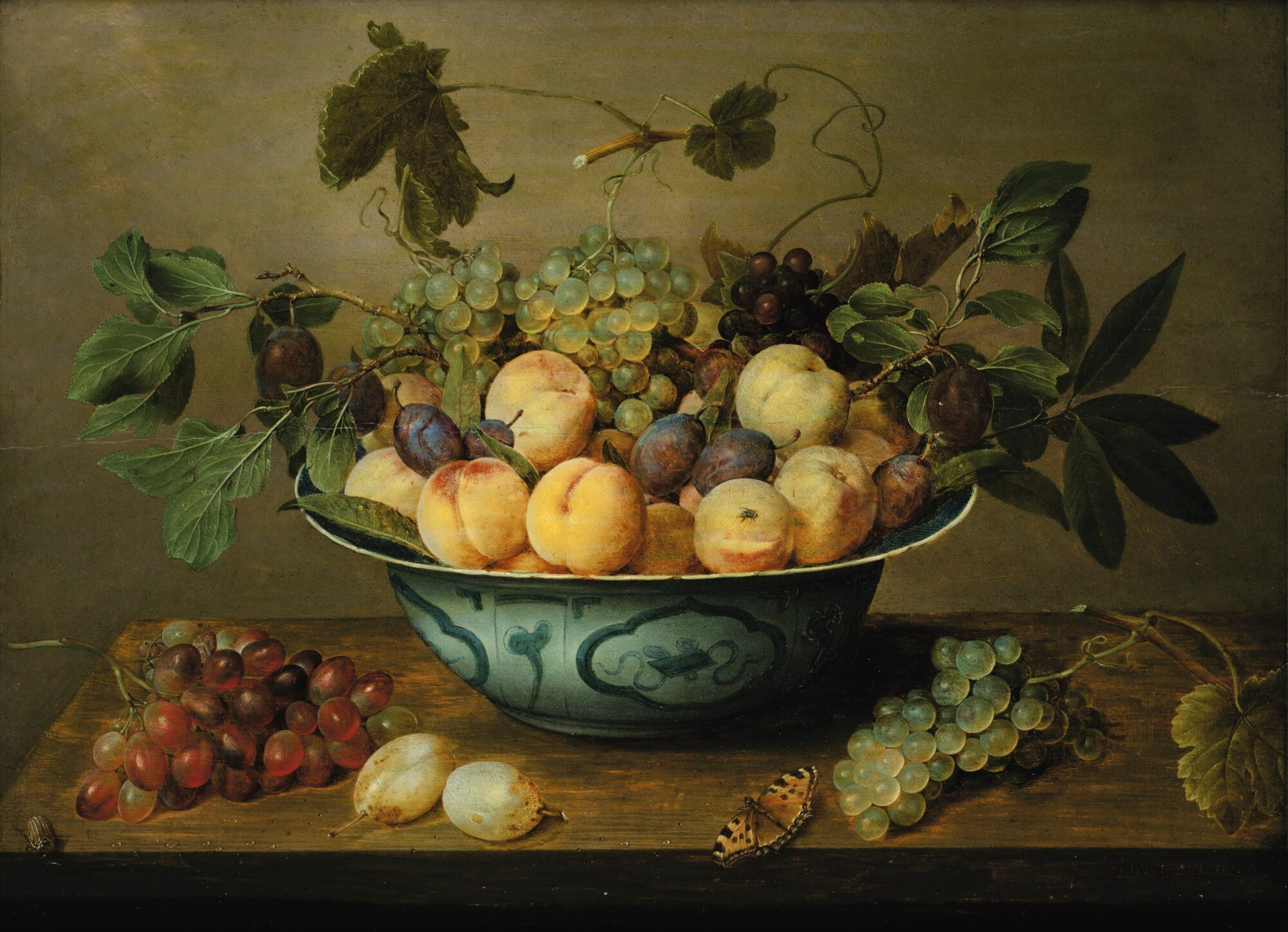
Still life with fruit in a Wanli bowl on a table with a butterfly and a scarab beetle

Because he only left one dated work, the Breakfast piece with a fish, ham and cherries of 1614 (Bowes Museum, Barnard Castle) it is difficult to establish a chronology of his works. Panel makers' marks are of little help in dating his work because of his preference for panels prepared with gesso on the reverse, which makes the wood more stable and less susceptible to warping. It is believed that his earliest still lifes are the ones in which the edge of the table is close to the bottom of the picture and the table is depicted from a rather elevated viewpoint. In these early works, the table is partly covered with a white cloth. In his later works he abandoned some of the rigidity of these early works by lowering the viewpoint, leaving some space under the table and including one side of the table in the composition. His palette is also believed to have evolved over the years and his later works have brighter colours and less dark backgrounds. His later still lifes are set out on plain wooden tables. The grain of the wood is typically depicted in great detail. Occasionally these tables are partly covered with a dark (greyish- or greenish-black) cloth.

Although he must have been familiar with the work of the Bosschaert studio, his work shows more affinity with the work of Osias Beert and even Hieronymous Francken II, two still life artists active in early 17th century Antwerp. It is even possible that van Hulsdonck worked in their circle before becoming a master in the Guild of Saint Luke in 1608. His flower pieces show the influence of Jan Brueghel the Elder.

Whereas 17th-century still lifes are usually believed to convey a hidden ‘message’, often related to the vanitas motif of the transience of all things, in van Hulsdonck's works this seems to have been largely absent. Van Hulsdonck did, however, often include a bluebottle as an eye-catching motif and the only living creature in his still lifes. Flies are often regarded as a symbol of the shortness of life.

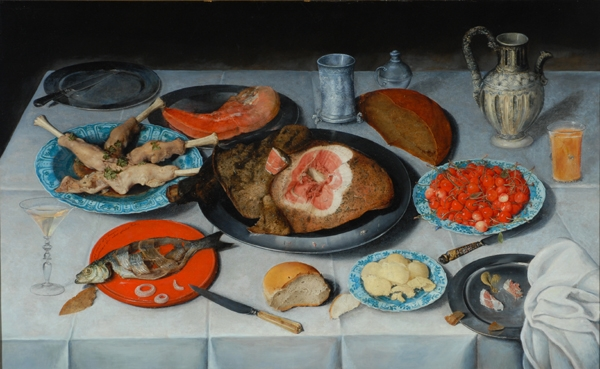
Breakfast piece with a fish, ham and cherries

=== Banquet pieces and fruit bowls ===
The banquet pieces of van Hulsdonck typically depict one bowl or basket of fruit in the center. There are six examples where he placed a small vase of flowers to one side of the bowl. The fruits are usual freshly picked plums, grapes, apricots or strawberries, although there is an example of a painting, the Still life with raisins, apricots and plums in a porcelain dish, which depicts dried fruit and nuts.

Van Hulsdonck was particularly skilled in rendering the softness and delicacy of the skins of the fruit. He was a master in bringing out the difference of texture and colouring of the various types of fruit and their foliage.

=== Flower pieces ===
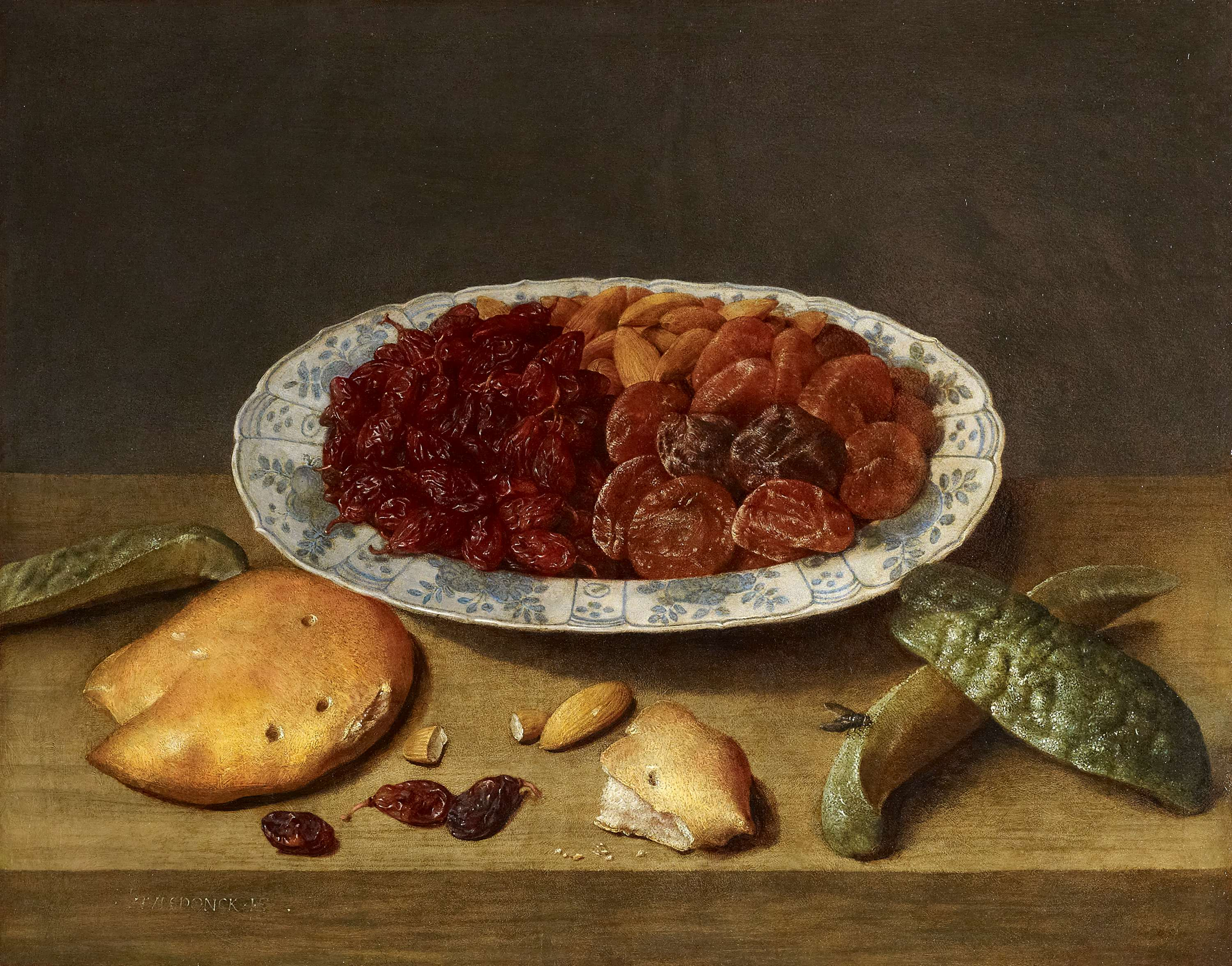
Still life with raisins, apricots and plums in a porcelain dish

Van Hulsdonck also painted pure flower still lifes although they account for a much smaller portion of his oeuvre. Only a few of these are signed and have therefore sometimes been attributed to other artists. For instance, the work Still life of tulips, carnations, a rose and other flowers in a glass beaker resting on a wooded ledge (sold at Sotheby's on 3 July 2013 in London, lot 23) was previously attributed to Jan van Kessel the Elder. His flower pieces can be regarded as a precursor of van Kessel's work as well as that of Daniel Seghers.

A few of his flower pieces only depict a single variety of flowers such as carnations, but most of the time he painted a mixture of a restricted number of blooms in which tulips dominate. The flowers are typically set against a dark background and are held in simple clear glass beakers with prunts in the lower register only, in order to allow the stems of each flower to be followed through to the base. His flower pieces show a greater formal elegance and refined simplicity than Brueghel's usually more elaborate flower pieces. This may possibly be due to Bosschaert's formative influence.
