= Robin Classen =

German politician (born 1991)

Member of the Landtag of Rhineland-Palatinate
- Incumbent
- Assumed office 18 May 2026

Personal details
- Born: 3 April 1991 (age 34)
- Party: Alternative for Germany (since 2015)

Robin Maximilian Classen (born 3 April 1991) is a German politician who was elected member of the Landtag of Rhineland-Palatinate in 2026. He has been a board member of the Alternative for Germany in Rhineland-Palatinate since 2017.
