= Claussen House =

Historic house in South Carolina, United States

- U.S. National Register of Historic Places
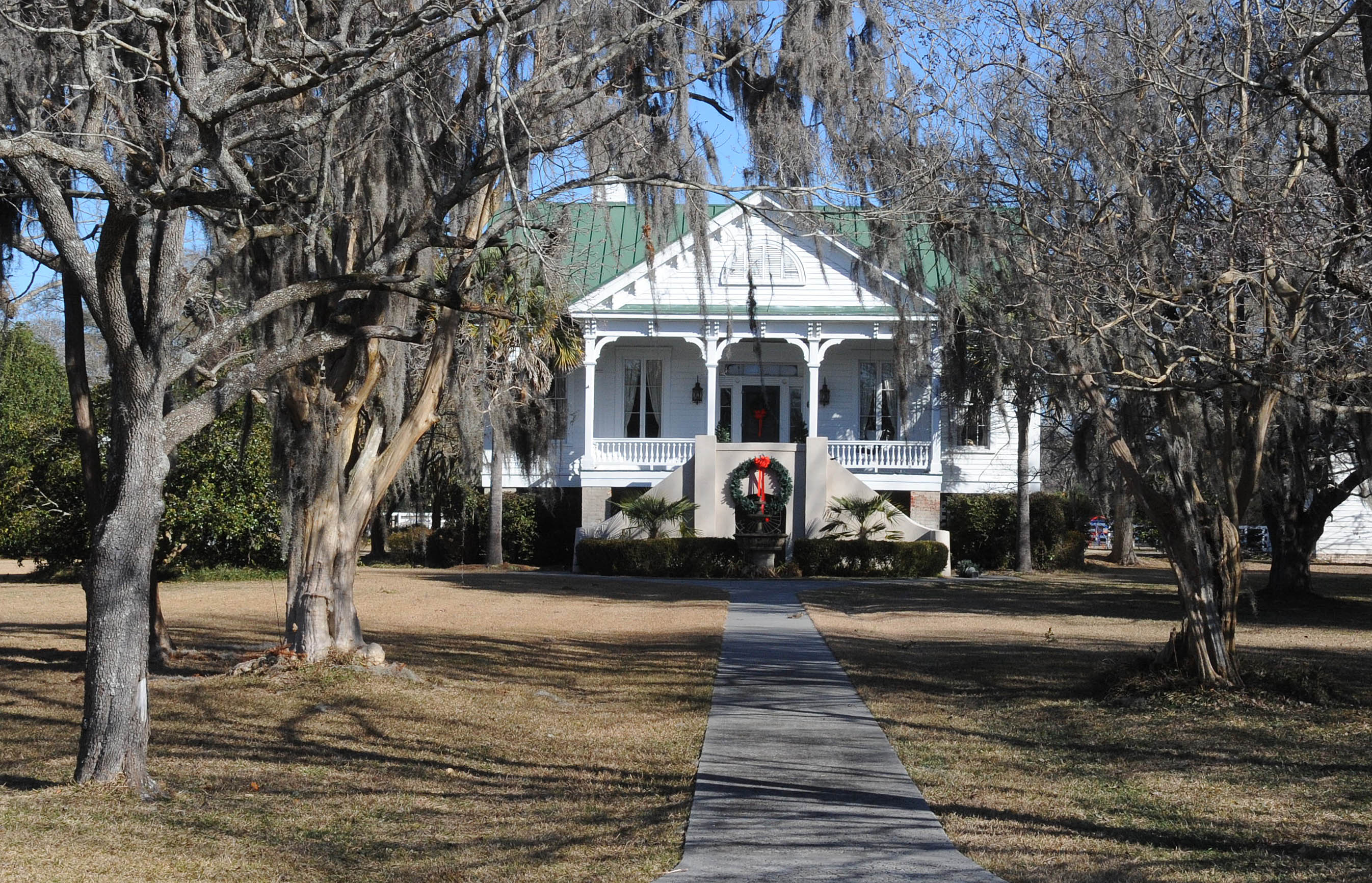

- Location within South Carolina Location within the United States
- Location: 5109 Old River Rd., Florence, South Carolina
- Coordinates: 34°07′53″N 79°37′14″W
- Area: 2.3 acres (0.93 ha)
- Built: c. 1830
- Architectural style: Greek Revival, Italianate
- NRHP reference No.: 01000343
- Added to NRHP: April 11, 2001

Claussen House, also known as the Howard-Harllee-Claussen House, is a historic plantation house located near Florence, Florence County, South Carolina. It was built about 1830, and is a raised cottage with early-19th century Greek Revival architecture and late-19th century Italianate style alterations and additions. Also on the property are a contributing smoke house, gardener's cottage, hothouse/greenhouse, chicken coop/outhouse, and carriage shed.

It was listed on the National Register of Historic Places in 2001.
