= Clas (given name) =

Clas is a masculine given name. Notable people with the name include:

- Clas Alströmer (1736–1794), Swedish naturalist
- Clas Bjerkander (1735–1795), Swedish meteorologist, botanist and entomologist
- Clas or Klaus Fleming (1535–1597), Finnish-born Swedish nobleman and admiral, Lord High Admiral and Lord High Constable
- Clas Larsson Fleming (1592–1644), an admiral and administrator of the Royal Swedish Navy
- Clas Frietzcky (1727–1803), Swedish politician
- Clas Lindberg (born 1956), Swedish film director and screenwriter
- Clas Theodor Odhner (1836–1904), Swedish historian and director of the Swedish National Archives
- Clas Thunberg (1893–1973), Finnish speed skater and five time Olympic gold medalist
- Clas Åkesson Tott (c. 1530 – 1590), Swedish field marshal and member of the Privy Council of Sweden
- Clas Åkesson Tott the Younger (1630–1674), Field marshal, Governor-General of Swedish Livonia and Ambassador in France

== See also ==
- Claes
