= Klassen =

Klassen is a surname. Notable people with the surname include:

- Ben Klassen (1918–1993), American white supremacist and founder of the religion Creativity
- Cindy Klassen (born 1979), Canadian skater
- Heinrich Klassen (born 1991), South African cricketer
- Danny Klassen (born 1975), American-Canadian baseball player
- Eduard Klassen, Paraguayan harpist
- Ernie Klassen, Canadian politician
- George Klassen (born 2002), American baseball player
- Johann Peter Klassen (1889–1947), German-Canadian poet
- Jon Klassen (born 1981), Canadian writer and illustrator of children's books
- Kenneth Klassen (born 1951), Canadian sex tourist
- Linda Klassen, Canadian politician
- Owen Klassen (born 1991), Canadian basketball player
- Peter P. Klassen (1926–2018), Paraguayan Mennonite historian
- Sarah Klassen (born 1932), Canadian poet
- Terry Klassen, Canadian voice actor and voice director

== See also ==
- Classen (surname)
- Kelasen, a village in Sarawak, Malaysia, whose alternative name is Klassen
- Klaassen
