= Johann Peter Klassen =

Johann Peter Klassen (1868–1947) was a Russian Mennonite poet and writer who emigrated to Canada in 1923 but wrote primarily in the German language. He was born 27 May 1868 (O.S. 15 May) in Neu-Schönwiese near Alexandrovsk (Zaporizhia) Ukraine (then part of Russia), the third of four children of Peter Abram Klassen (22 October 1825 – 13 February 1905) and Aganetha (Schultz) Klassen (1 April 1832 – 7 December 1920). His father had four children from his first marriage to Anna Janzen (1828-1863).

Johann was married first to Katharina Wieler (26 February 1870, in Nikolaifeld Yazykovo, South Russia – 31 August 1909, in Neu Schönwiese, Chortitza Settlement, South Russia) on 27 September 1891 in Franzfeld, Yazykovo, South Russia. She was the daughter of Abraham Wieler (23 January 1841 – 31 January 1907) and Helena (Lepp) Wieler (14 January 1848 – 29 May 1911). Johann and Katharina had eight children: Peter, Helena, Aganeta, Abram, Johann, Käthe, Heinrich, and Kornelius.

After Katharina's death, Johann married for the second time on 8 May 1911 in Chortitza Chortitza Settlement to Katharina Dyck (d. 21 December 1953, in Winnipeg, Manitoba). Johann and his second wife Katharina had two sons, Victor and Eduard.

Johann died in Vancouver, British Columbia on 25 May 1947 and is buried in Winnipeg, Manitoba.

After completing the Chortitza Zentralschule, he served as village schoolteacher for five years. He served the Kronsweide Mennonite congregation as preacher from 1904 and as elder from 1907 until his immigration to Canada in 1923, though he lived in Schonwiese. In 1928 he founded the Schonwiese (First Mennonite) church in Winnipeg, serving as its elder until his retirement in 1939.

Klassen was a rather prolific writer, chiefly of poems. J. H. Janzen calls him "the most productive and most natural of [the Russo-Canadian Mennonite] poets." He adds, "he writes mostly for existing melodies, so his poems at the moment they appear are already songs .... An inexhaustible and unconquerable joy speaks out of all his poems..., even though he has suffered much from an infirmity."

His published booklets of poems include Aehrenlese (Winnipeg, n.d., 73 p.), Brocken (Winnipeg, 1932, 32 p.), Dunkle Tage (Scottdale, 1924? 32 p.), Krümlein (Scottdale, 1924? 43 p.), Meine Garbe (Vancouver, n.d., 102 p.), Nohoaksel (Yarrow, 1946, 87 p.), Roggenbrot (Vancouver, 1946, 134 p.), Wegeblumen (Scottdale, 1924? 52 p.), Der Zwillingsbruder von "Meine Garbe" (Vancouver, n.d., 100 p.). In addition he also published Reiseskizzen über die Auswanderung im Jahre 1923 (Scottdale, 1924? 37 p.).

== Bibliography ==
Poetry

- Nohoaksel (1946)
- Roggenbrot (1946)
- Der Zwillingsbruder von "Meine Garbe" (1946)
- Aehrenlese (1944)
- Brocken (1932)
- Dunkle Tage (1924)
- Kruemlein (1924)
- Wegeblumen (c.1924)

Autobiography Reiseskizzen über die Auswanderung im Jahre 1923 (Scottdale, 1924? 37 p translated into English and republished in Two Journeys of Faith
