= Classun =

- Commune
- Coat of arms
- Location of Classun
- Location within France Location within Nouvelle-Aquitaine
- Coordinates: 43°42′42″N 0°24′46″W
- Country: France
- Region: Nouvelle-Aquitaine
- Department: Landes
- Arrondissement: Mont-de-Marsan
- Canton: Adour Armagnac
- Intercommunality: Aire-sur-l'Adour

Government
  - Mayor (2020–2026): Jean-Michel Lalanne
- Area^{1}: 8.82 km^{2} (3.41 sq mi)
- Elevation: 140 m (460 ft)
- Highest elevation: 154 m (505 ft)
- Lowest elevation: 76 m (249 ft)
- Population (2023): 242
  - Density: 27.4/km^{2} (71.1/sq mi)
- Time zone: UTC+01:00 (CET)
  - Summer (DST): UTC+02:00 (CEST)
- INSEE/Postal code: 40082 /40320
- ^{1} French Land Register data, which excludes lakes, ponds, glaciers > 1 km^{2} (0.386 sq mi or 247 acres) and river estuaries.

Classun (French pronunciation: [klasœ̃]) is a commune in the Landes department in Nouvelle-Aquitaine in southwestern France.

== Population ==
Historical population
Year	Pop.	±% p.a.
1968	189	—
1975	175	−1.09%
1982	156	−1.63%
1990	156	+0.00%
1999	180	+1.60%
2007	226	+2.89%
2012	262	+3.00%
2017	271	+0.68%
2023	242	−1.87%
Source: INSEE

== See also ==
- Communes of the Landes department
