= Ola Billgren =

Swedish artist (1940–2001)

- Born: 5 January 1940
- Died: 4 November 2001 (aged 61)
- Occupations: Artist and art theorist

Ola Billgren (5 January 1940 – 4 November 2001) was a Swedish artist and art theorist. His art can be seen in various public collections including Musée National d'Art Moderne in Paris and Moderna Museet in Stockholm.

After a few years of informal art, Billgren became influenced by the new realism and photorealism in the 1960s, often, however, using contrasting abstract elements in his works. He then had his breakthrough.

After the mid-1970s he turned to seemingly traditional landscapes, deconstructing the conventions of romantic painting.

Later on, he also examined colours and light in abstract paintings. In the 1990s he presented a series of red-surfaced paintings, which at first sight give the impression of something abstract, after which the underlying pictures slowly emerge, like "suppressed figurations".
