= Klaassen =

Klaasen is Dutch patronymic surname ("son of Klaas"). Notable people with this name include:

- Arno Klaassen (born 1979), Dutch bobsledder
- Davy Klaassen (born 1993), Dutch footballer
- Jozef Klaassen (born 1983), Dutch rower
- Leo Klaassen (1920–1992), Dutch economist
- Mihkel Klaassen (1880–1952), Estonian Supreme Court judge
- Nel Klaassen (1906–1989), Dutch sculptor
- René Klaassen (born 1961), Dutch field hockey player
- Fred Klaassen (born 1992), Dutch cricketer
- Ryan Klaassen, lead plaintiff in the 2021 vaccine law case Klaassen v. Indiana University

Klaassens

- Jan Klaassens (1931–1983), Dutch footballer

== See also ==
- Klaasen
- Claassen
- Klassen
- Jan Klaassen, the Dutch puppet version of Pulcinella (Mister Punch)
