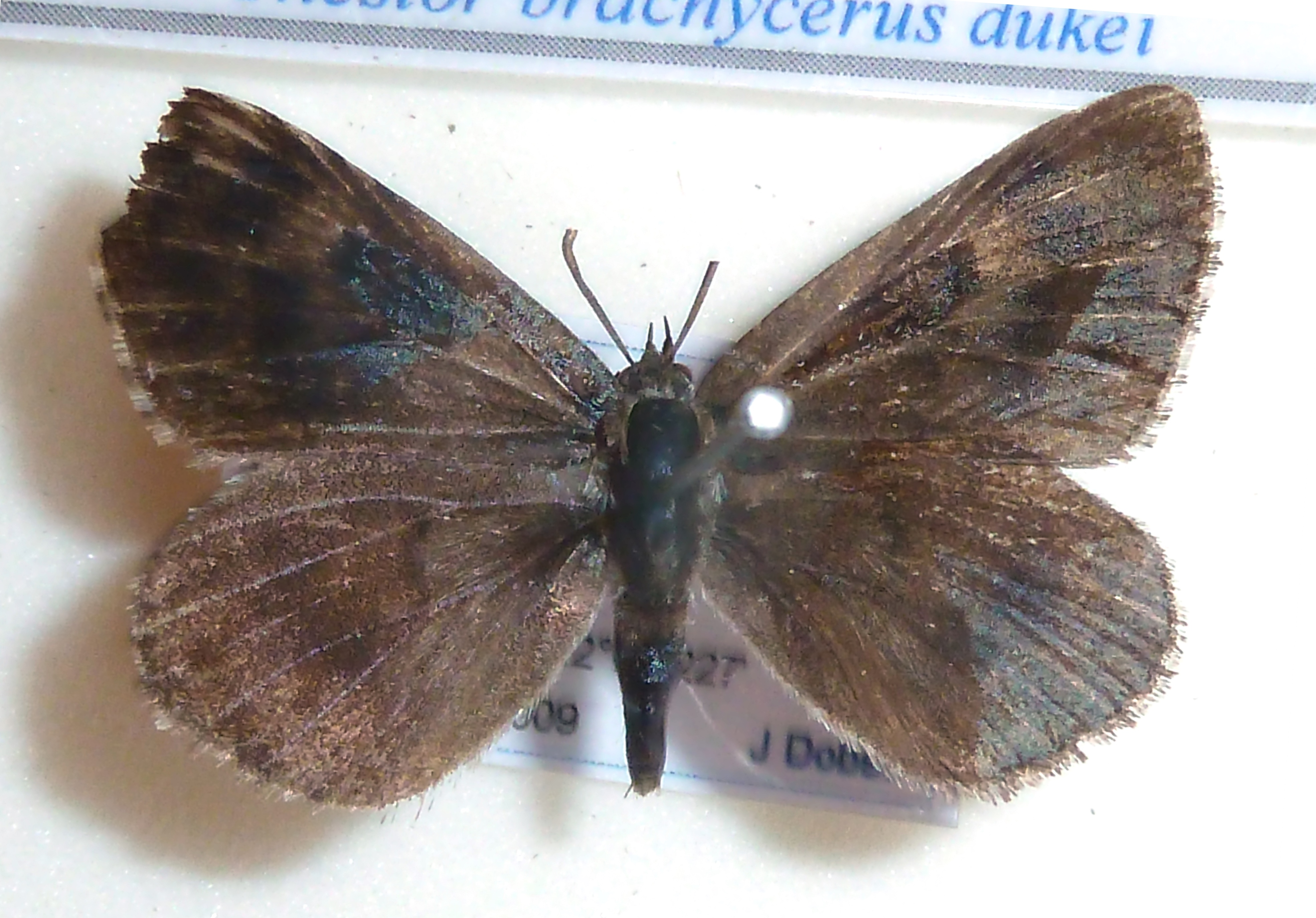
- Thestor brachycerus subsp. dukei

Conservation status
- Least Concern (IUCN 3.1)

Scientific classification
- Kingdom: Animalia
- Phylum: Arthropoda
- Class: Insecta
- Order: Lepidoptera
- Family: Lycaenidae
- Genus: Thestor
- Species: T. brachycerus

Binomial name
- Thestor brachycerus (Trimen, 1883)

Synonyms
- Arrugia brachycera Trimen, 1883; Thestor dukei van Son, 1951

= Thestor brachycerus =

Knysna skolly

Species of butterfly

Thestor brachycerus, the Knysna skolly, is a species of butterfly in the family Lycaenidae. It is endemic to South Africa.

The wingspan is 27–36 mm for males and 29–39 mm for females. Adults are on the wing from December to January. There is one generation per year.

Larvae have been found in the nests of the pugnacious ant, Anoplolepis custodiens, but the larval food is unknown.

== Subspecies ==
- Thestor brachycerus brachycerus – seaside skolly

Range: Western Cape, confined to the heads at Knysna

- Thestor brachycerus dukei van Son, 1951 – Duke's skolly

Range: Karoo and fynbos along the Langeberg from Die Koo to Montagu, then along the Swartberg and Elandsberg to the Outeniqua Mountains and along the southern Western Cape coast from Kogelberg to Stanford
