= Thestor braunsi =

Conservation status
- Least Concern (IUCN 3.1)

Scientific classification
- Kingdom: Animalia
- Phylum: Arthropoda
- Class: Insecta
- Order: Lepidoptera
- Family: Lycaenidae
- Genus: Thestor
- Species: T. braunsi

Binomial name
- Thestor braunsi van Son, 1941

Species of butterfly

Thestor braunsi, the Braun's skolly, is a butterfly of the family Lycaenidae. It is found in South Africa, where it is known from the West Cape Nama Karoo from Greyton, the north and south of Swartberg, east to Willowmore and west to the Robertson area.

The wingspan is 26–28 mm for males and 27–30 mm for females. Adults are on wing from October and March in most of the range and in January in Greyton. There are two generations per year.
