= Thestor rileyi =

Conservation status
- Least Concern (IUCN 3.1)

Scientific classification
- Kingdom: Animalia
- Phylum: Arthropoda
- Class: Insecta
- Order: Lepidoptera
- Family: Lycaenidae
- Genus: Thestor
- Species: T. rileyi

Binomial name
- Thestor rileyi Pennington, 1956

Species of butterfly

Thestor rileyi, the Riley's skolly, is a butterfly of the family Lycaenidae. It is found in South Africa, where it is known from the Western Cape, from the Helderberg and Paarl mountains to the Kouebokkeveldberg, Piketberg and Paardeberg mountain ranges.

The wingspan is 24–36 mm for males and 32.5–41 mm for females. Adults are on wing from late November to early January with a peak in December. There is one generation per year.

Larvae have been found in the nests of the pugnacious ant (Anoplolepis custodiens), but the larval food is unknown.
