= Erica pannosa =

Scientific classification
- Kingdom: Plantae
- Clade: Tracheophytes
- Clade: Angiosperms
- Clade: Eudicots
- Clade: Asterids
- Order: Ericales
- Family: Ericaceae
- Genus: Erica
- Species: E. pannosa

Binomial name
- Erica pannosa Salisb.

Synonyms
- Erica barbata Andrews; Erica cistifolia Link; Ericoides barbatum (Andrews) Kuntze; Ericoides cistifolium (Link) Kuntze; Gypsocallis cistifolia (Link) G.Don

Species of flowering plant

Erica pannosa is a plant belonging to the genus Erica and is part of the fynbos. The species is endemic to the Western Cape and occurs at Greyton in the Riviersonderend Mountains. The area of occurrence is smaller than 30 km² and the plant is considered rare.
