= Thestor stepheni =

Conservation status
- Least Concern (IUCN 3.1)

Scientific classification
- Kingdom: Animalia
- Phylum: Arthropoda
- Class: Insecta
- Order: Lepidoptera
- Family: Lycaenidae
- Genus: Thestor
- Species: T. stepheni

Binomial name
- Thestor stepheni Swanepoel, 1968

Species of butterfly

Thestor stepheni, the Stephen's skolly, is a species of butterfly in the family Lycaenidae.

== Characteristics ==
It is endemic to South Africa, where it is found in the Riviersonderend Mountains above the Boesmanskloof Pass and Greyton in the Western Cape. It is also found on the Klipberg.

The wingspan is 27–36 mm for males and 31–40 mm for females. Adults are on wing from December to January, with a peak in December. There is one generation per year.
