= Sneeuberg =

Sneeuberg (Afrikaans for Snow Mountain) may refer to:

- Sneeuberg, highest peak in the Cederberg mountains, West Coast, Western Cape, South Africa
- Sneeuberge, mountain range in the western part of the Eastern Cape province, South Africa
