= Thestor compassbergae =

Conservation status
- Least Concern (IUCN 3.1)

Scientific classification
- Kingdom: Animalia
- Phylum: Arthropoda
- Class: Insecta
- Order: Lepidoptera
- Family: Lycaenidae
- Genus: Thestor
- Species: T. compassbergae

Binomial name
- Thestor compassbergae Quickelberge & McMaster, 1970

Species of butterfly

Thestor compassbergae, the Compassberg skolly, is a species of butterfly in the family Lycaenidae. It is endemic to South Africa, where it is only known from grassy inclusions in Nama Karoo on the mountain slopes of the Kompasberg, above Nieu-Bethesda in the East Cape.

The wingspan is 26–29 mm for males and 27–30 mm for females. Adults are on wing in mid-December. There is one generation per year.
