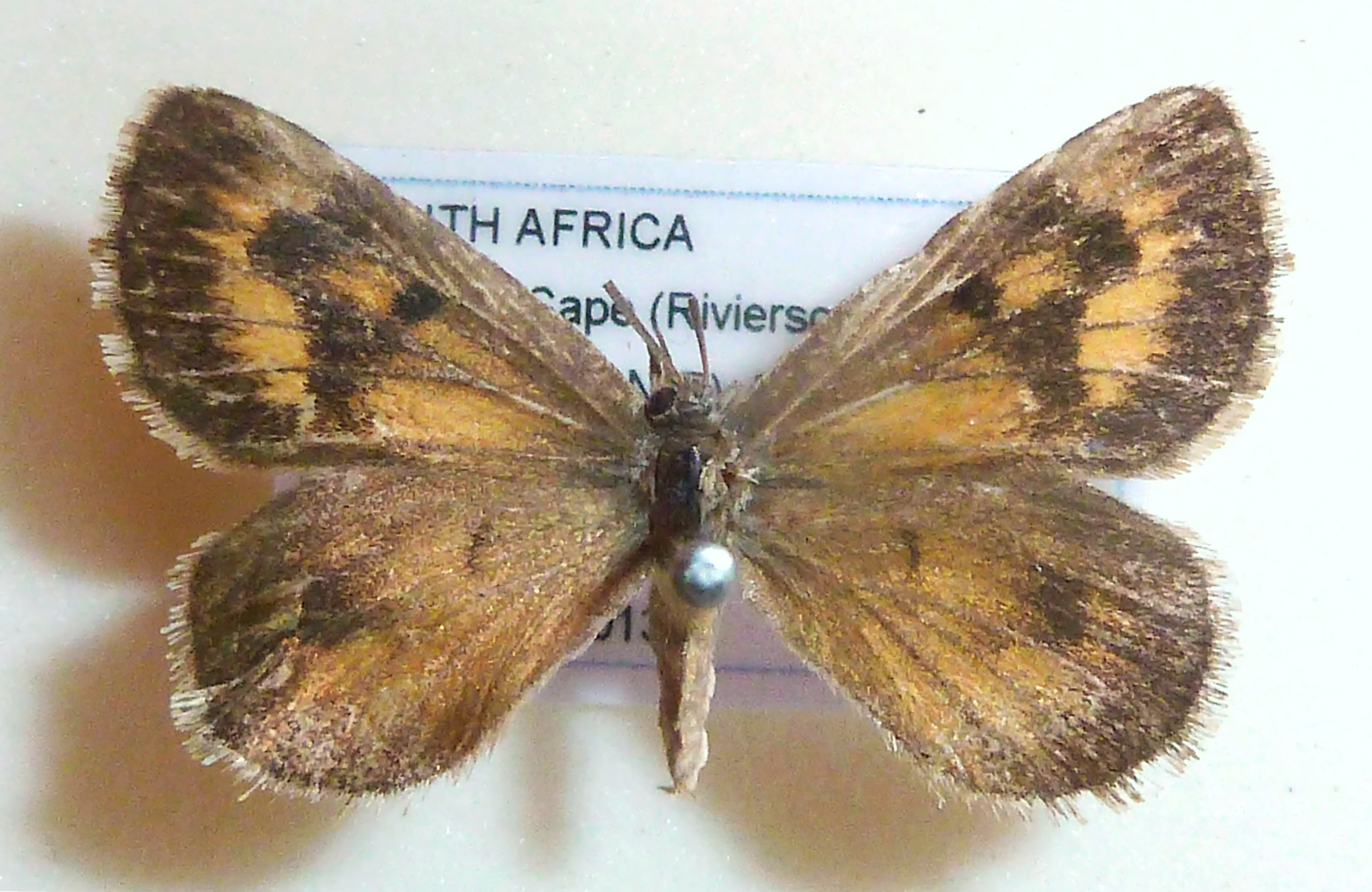

Conservation status
- Critically Endangered (IUCN 3.1)

Scientific classification
- Kingdom: Animalia
- Phylum: Arthropoda
- Class: Insecta
- Order: Lepidoptera
- Family: Lycaenidae
- Genus: Thestor
- Species: T. kaplani

Binomial name
- Thestor kaplani Dickson & Stephen, 1971

= Kaplan's thestor =

Species of butterfly

Kaplan's skolly or Kaplan's thestor (Thestor kaplani), is a species of butterfly in the family Lycaenidae. It is endemic to South Africa, where it is only known from fynbos on the slopes of the Riviersonderend Mountains above Greyton in the Western Cape.

The wingspan is 26–28 mm for males and 27–29 mm for females. Adults are on wing from December to January. There is one generation per year.
