= Thestor yildizae =

Conservation status
- Least Concern (IUCN 3.1)

Scientific classification
- Kingdom: Animalia
- Phylum: Arthropoda
- Class: Insecta
- Order: Lepidoptera
- Family: Lycaenidae
- Genus: Thestor
- Species: T. yildizae

Binomial name
- Thestor yildizae Koçak, 1983

Synonyms
- Thestor obscurus van Son, 1941

Species of butterfly

Thestor yildizae, the peninsula skolly, is a species of butterfly in the family Lycaenidae. It is endemic to South Africa, where it is only found on the high slopes of the Cape Peninsula Mountains in the Western Cape.

The wingspan is 25–32 mm for males and 28–36.5 mm for females. Adults are on wing from late November to early February. There is one generation per year.

Larvae have been found in the nests of the pugnacious ant (Anoplolepis custodiens), but the larval food is unknown.
