= Thestor pictus =

Conservation status
- Least Concern (IUCN 3.1)

Scientific classification
- Kingdom: Animalia
- Phylum: Arthropoda
- Class: Insecta
- Order: Lepidoptera
- Family: Lycaenidae
- Genus: Thestor
- Species: T. pictus

Binomial name
- Thestor pictus van Son, 1941

Synonyms
- Thestor montanus pictus van Son, 1941

Species of butterfly

Thestor pictus, the Langeberg skolly, is a butterfly of the family Lycaenidae. It is found in South Africa, where it is found in fynbos-covered mountain slopes above Garcia's Pass on the Langeberg.

The wingspan is 26–28 mm for males and 27–29 mm for females. Adults are on wing from the end of September to November, with a peak in October. There is one generation per year.

Larvae have been found in the nests of the pugnacious ant Anoplolepis custodiens, but the larval food is unknown.
