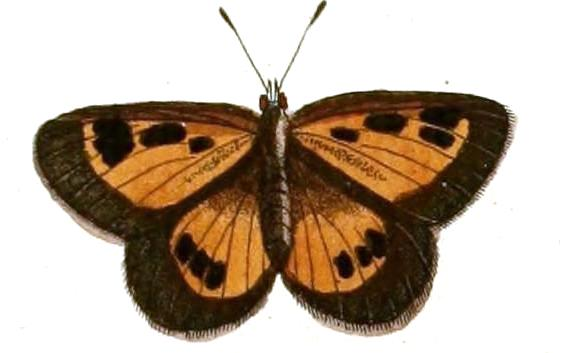

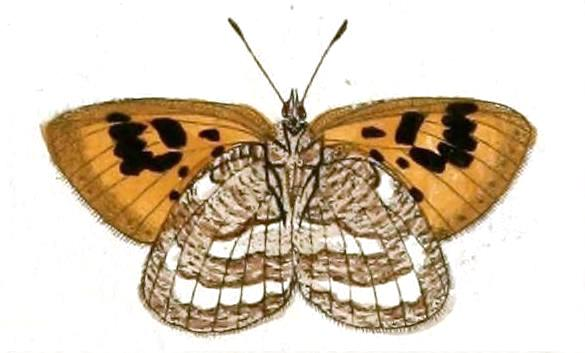

Scientific classification
- Kingdom: Animalia
- Phylum: Arthropoda
- Class: Insecta
- Order: Lepidoptera
- Family: Lycaenidae
- Genus: Thestor
- Species: T. protumnus

Binomial name
- Thestor protumnus (Linnaeus, 1764)

Synonyms
- Papilio protumnus Linnaeus, 1764; Papilio petalus Cramer, [1779]; Thestor protumnus mijburghi Dickson & Wykeham, 1994; Thestor terblanchei Henning & Henning, 1993; Papilio silvius Fabricius, 1787

= Thestor protumnus =

Boland skolly

Species of butterfly

Thestor protumnus, the Boland skolly, is a butterfly of the family Lycaenidae. It is only found in South Africa.

The wingspan is 22–37.5 mm for males and 24–42.5 mm for females. Adults are on wing from September to December and August to October in Namaqualand. Subspecies terblanchei is on wing from January to March. The peak flight times vary per locality.

The larvae feed on coccids (scale insects).

== Subspecies ==
- Thestor protumnus protumnus – Cape Peninsula, south-western Cape
- Thestor protumnus aridus van Son, 1941 – Cape, Free State
- Thestor protumnus terblanchei Henning & Henning, 1993 – Free State

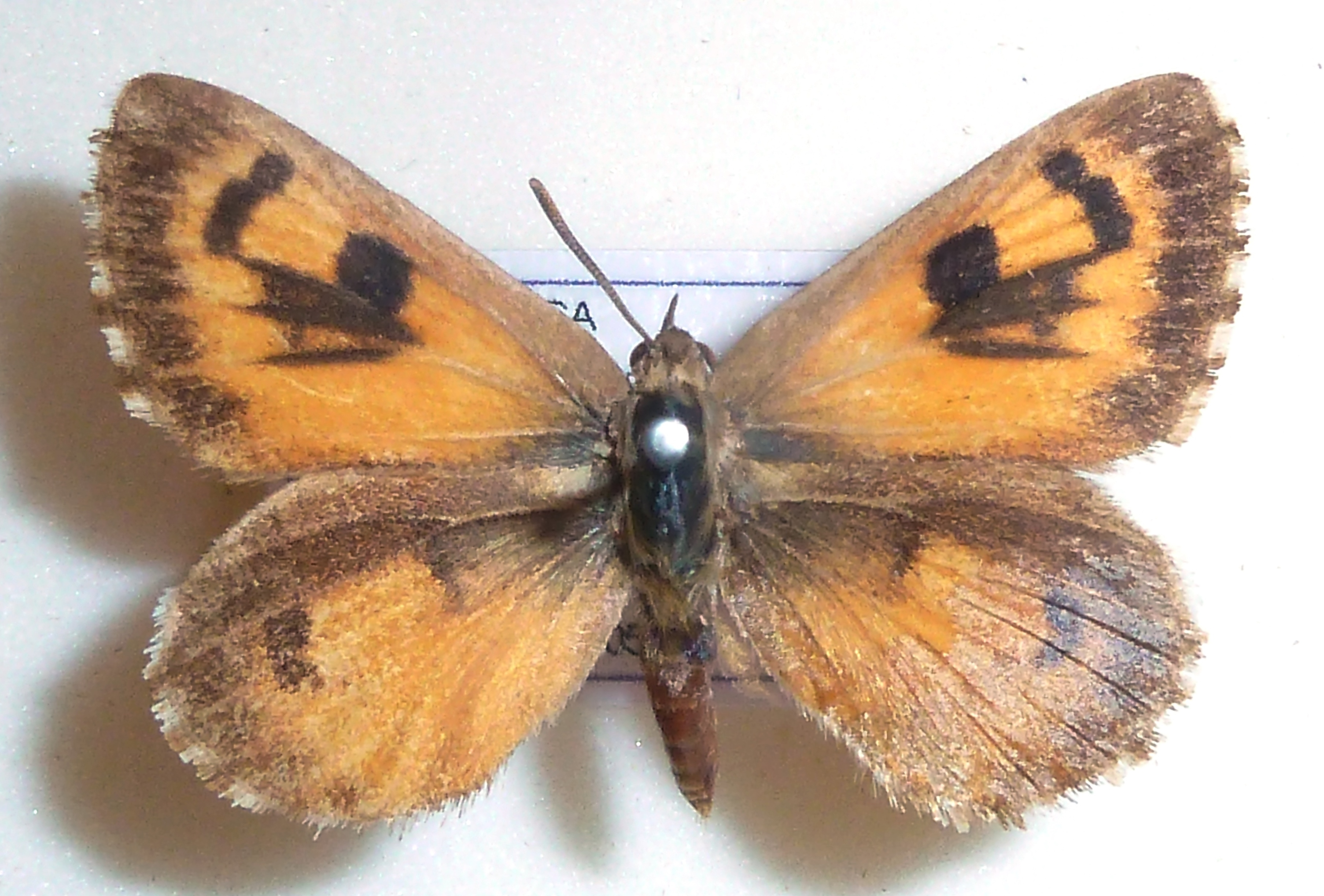
T. p. subsp. aridus, the desert Boland skolly
