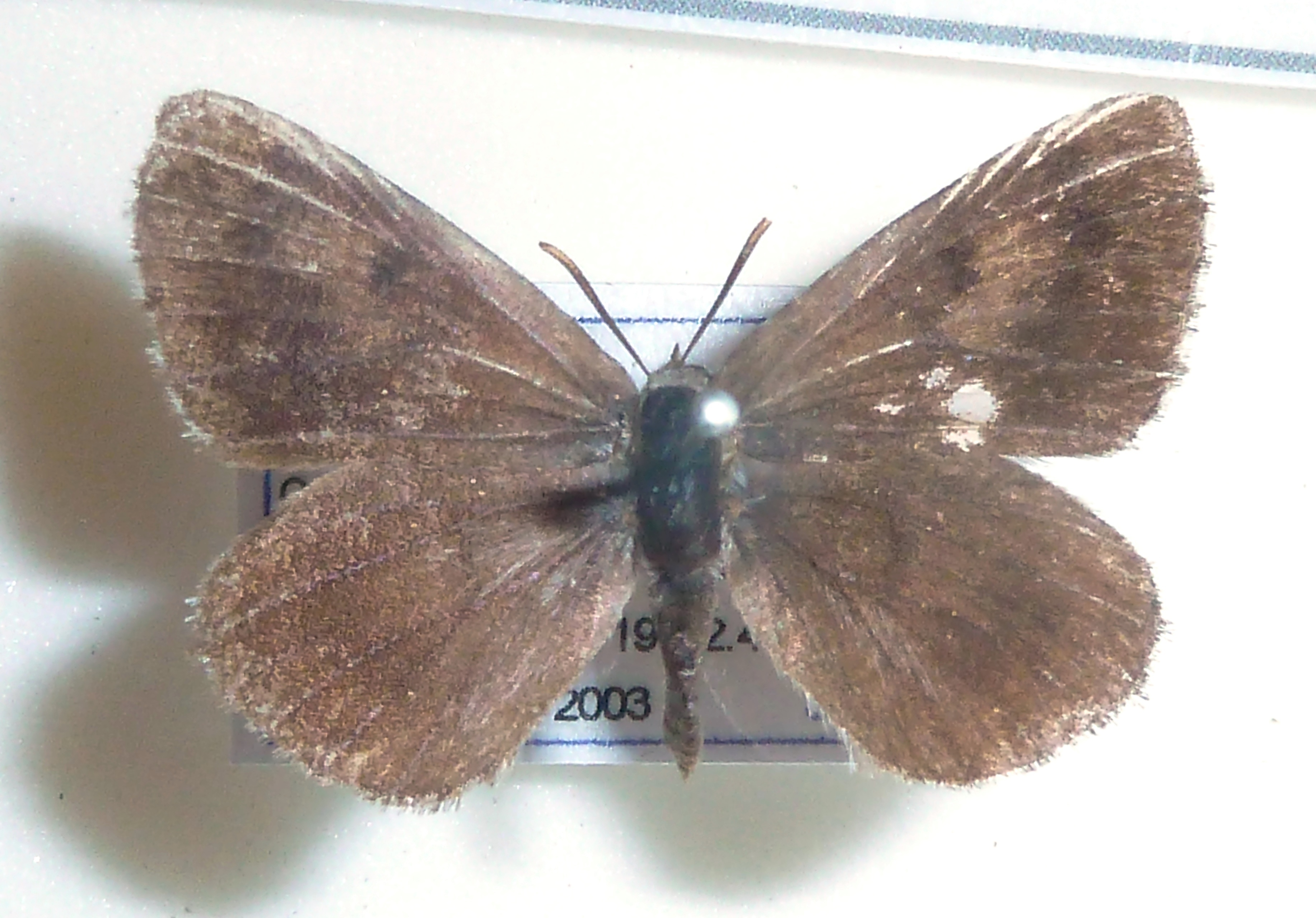

Conservation status
- Vulnerable (IUCN 2.3)

Scientific classification
- Kingdom: Animalia
- Phylum: Arthropoda
- Class: Insecta
- Order: Lepidoptera
- Family: Lycaenidae
- Genus: Thestor
- Species: T. petra

Binomial name
- Thestor petra Pennington, 1962

Synonyms
- Thestor tempe Pennington, 1962

= Thestor petra =

Rock skolly

Species of butterfly

Thestor petra, the rock skolly, is a species of butterfly in the family Lycaenidae. It is endemic to South Africa.

The wingspan is 22–28 mm for males and 26–34 mm for females. Adults are on wing from late November to January. There is one generation per year.

== Subspecies ==
- Thestor petra petra (Western Cape on the Gydoberg, Tierberg, Matroosberg and Skurweberg mountains around Ceres)
- Thestor petra tempe Pennington, 1962 (Western Cape in the Klein Karoo mountains near Seweweekspoort, Elandsberg and Rooiberg)
