= Thestor dicksoni =

Scientific classification
- Domain: Eukaryota
- Kingdom: Animalia
- Phylum: Arthropoda
- Class: Insecta
- Order: Lepidoptera
- Family: Lycaenidae
- Genus: Thestor
- Species: T. dicksoni

Binomial name
- Thestor dicksoni Riley, 1954

Synonyms
- Thestor malagas Dickson & Wykeham, 1994

Species of butterfly

Thestor dicksoni, the Dickson's skolly, is a butterfly of the family Lycaenidae. It is found in South Africa.

The wingspan is 34-37.5 mm for males and 43–45 mm for females. Adults are on wing from December to April. There is one generation per year.

== Subspecies ==
- Thestor dicksoni dicksoni (montane fynbos in the Dasklip Pass near Porterville to the Roodezandsberg near the Tulbagh Kloof)
- Thestor dicksoni malagas Dickson & Wykeham, 1994 (along the Atlantic coast and on the Langebaan peninsula)
- Thestor dicksoni warreni Ball, 1994 (arid strandveld Karoo near Graafwater, between Clanwilliam and Lambertsbaai)
