= Anoplolepis nuptialis =

Conservation status
- Vulnerable (IUCN 2.3)

Scientific classification
- Kingdom: Animalia
- Phylum: Arthropoda
- Class: Insecta
- Order: Hymenoptera
- Family: Formicidae
- Subfamily: Formicinae
- Genus: Anoplolepis
- Species: A. nuptialis

Binomial name
- Anoplolepis nuptialis (Santschi, 1917)

Species of ant

Anoplolepis nuptialis is a species of ant in the genus Anoplolepis. It is native to South Africa.
