= Thestor murrayi =

Conservation status
- Least Concern (IUCN 3.1)

Scientific classification
- Kingdom: Animalia
- Phylum: Arthropoda
- Class: Insecta
- Order: Lepidoptera
- Family: Lycaenidae
- Genus: Thestor
- Species: T. murrayi

Binomial name
- Thestor murrayi Swanepoel, 1953

Species of butterfly

Thestor murrayi, the Murray's skolly, is a butterfly of the family Lycaenidae. It is found in South Africa, where it is identified from Name Karoo in the West Cape, from the Swartberg to the Kammanassie, Outeniqua and Tsitsikamma mountains to the Groot Winterhoekberge and Baviaanskloofberge in the East Cape.

The wingspan is 26–28 mm for males and 27–29 mm for females. Adults are on wing from October to January. There is one generation per year.
