= Thestor holmesi =

Conservation status
- Least Concern (IUCN 3.1)

Scientific classification
- Kingdom: Animalia
- Phylum: Arthropoda
- Class: Insecta
- Order: Lepidoptera
- Family: Lycaenidae
- Genus: Thestor
- Species: T. holmesi

Binomial name
- Thestor holmesi van Son, 1951

Species of butterfly

Thestor holmesi, the Holmes's skolly, is a butterfly of the family Lycaenidae. It is found in South Africa, where it is known to range in the West Cape, from the Outeniqua Mountains and Jonkershoek.

The wingspan is 26.5-35.5 mm for males and 30.5-39.5 mm for females. Adults are on wing from December to early January. There is one generation per year.
