= Thestor strutti =

Conservation status
- Critically Endangered (IUCN 3.1)

Scientific classification
- Kingdom: Animalia
- Phylum: Arthropoda
- Class: Insecta
- Order: Lepidoptera
- Family: Lycaenidae
- Genus: Thestor
- Species: T. strutti

Binomial name
- Thestor strutti van Son, 1951

Species of butterfly

Thestor strutti, the Strutt's skolly, is a species of butterfly in the family Lycaenidae. It is endemic to South Africa, where it is only known from sparse fynbos on the high slopes near the north end of the Bainskloof Pass near Wolseley in the Western Cape.

The wingspan is 25–27 mm for males and 26–28 mm for females. Adults are on wing from late July or August to early September. There is one generation per year.
