= Thestor pringlei =

Conservation status
- Least Concern (IUCN 3.1)

Scientific classification
- Kingdom: Animalia
- Phylum: Arthropoda
- Class: Insecta
- Order: Lepidoptera
- Family: Lycaenidae
- Genus: Thestor
- Species: T. pringlei

Binomial name
- Thestor pringlei Dickson, 1976

Species of butterfly

Thestor pringlei, the Pringle's skolly, is a species of butterfly in the family Lycaenidae. It is endemic to South Africa, where it is found in the Western Cape in dry Nama Karoo on the Roggeveld escarpment near Sutherland and near Calvinia in the Northern Cape.

The wingspan is 26–28 mm for males and 27–29 mm for females. Adults are on wing in December. There is one generation per year.
