= Thestor dryburghi =

Conservation status
- Least Concern (IUCN 3.1)

Scientific classification
- Kingdom: Animalia
- Phylum: Arthropoda
- Class: Insecta
- Order: Lepidoptera
- Family: Lycaenidae
- Genus: Thestor
- Species: T. dryburghi

Binomial name
- Thestor dryburghi van Son, 1966

Species of butterfly

Thestor dryburghi, the Dryburgh's skolly, is a species of butterfly in the family Lycaenidae. It is endemic to South Africa, which is only known from northern Namaqualand in succulent Karoo-covered hills at Kamieskroon to the north-west of Steinkopf in the North Cape.

The wingspan is 34–37 mm for males and 36–38 mm for females. Adults are on wing from August to October. There is one generation per year.
