= Thestor montanus =

Conservation status
- Least Concern (IUCN 3.1)

Scientific classification
- Kingdom: Animalia
- Phylum: Arthropoda
- Class: Insecta
- Order: Lepidoptera
- Family: Lycaenidae
- Genus: Thestor
- Species: T. montanus

Binomial name
- Thestor montanus van Son, 1941

Species of butterfly

Thestor montanus, the mountain skolly, is a butterfly of the family Lycaenidae. It is found in South Africa, where it is found in fynbos covered high mountain slopes in the south-western West Cape, from Caledon to the Hottentots.

The wingspan is 23–28 mm for males and 27–29 mm for females. They can present both dark and pale color morphs. Adults are on wing from October to February, with a peak in November. There is one generation per year.
