= Thestor claassensi =

Conservation status
- Endangered (IUCN 3.1)

Scientific classification
- Kingdom: Animalia
- Phylum: Arthropoda
- Class: Insecta
- Order: Lepidoptera
- Family: Lycaenidae
- Genus: Thestor
- Species: T. claassensi

Binomial name
- Thestor claassensi Heath & Pringle, 2004

Species of butterfly

Thestor claassensi, the Claassen's skolly, is a butterfly of the family Lycaenidae. It is found in South Africa, where it is only known from the West Cape on coastal rocky outcrops in fynbos near Stilnaai between Knysna and Cape Town.

The wingspan is 27–36 mm for males and 29–39 mm for females. Adults are on wing from November to early December. There is one generation per year.
