= Thestor camdeboo =

Conservation status
- Least Concern (IUCN 3.1)

Scientific classification
- Kingdom: Animalia
- Phylum: Arthropoda
- Clade: Pancrustacea
- Class: Insecta
- Order: Lepidoptera
- Family: Lycaenidae
- Genus: Thestor
- Species: T. camdeboo

Binomial name
- Thestor camdeboo Dickson & Wykeham, 1994

Species of butterfly

Thestor camdeboo, the Camdeboo skolly, is a butterfly of the family Lycaenidae. It is found in South Africa, where it is only known from grassveld inclusions in Nama Karoo on the upper slopes of the Camdeboo Mountains north of Aberdeen in the East Cape.

The wingspan is 26–28 mm for males and 27–29 mm for females. Adults are on the wing from the end of November to mid-December. There is one generation per year.
