= Thestor rooibergensis =

Conservation status
- Least Concern (IUCN 3.1)

Scientific classification
- Kingdom: Animalia
- Phylum: Arthropoda
- Class: Insecta
- Order: Lepidoptera
- Family: Lycaenidae
- Genus: Thestor
- Species: T. rooibergensis

Binomial name
- Thestor rooibergensis Heath, 1994

Species of butterfly

Thestor rooibergensis, the Rooiberg skolly, is a butterfly of the family Lycaenidae. It is found in South Africa, where it is found in fynbos-covered mountain slopes in the Rooiberg area above Ladismith in the Western Cape.

The wingspan is 26–28 mm for males and 27–29 mm for females. Adults are on wing from the September to December, with a peak in October. There is one generation per year.
