= Thestor penningtoni =

Conservation status
- Least Concern (IUCN 3.1)

Scientific classification
- Kingdom: Animalia
- Phylum: Arthropoda
- Class: Insecta
- Order: Lepidoptera
- Family: Lycaenidae
- Genus: Thestor
- Species: T. penningtoni

Binomial name
- Thestor penningtoni van Son, 1949

Species of butterfly

Thestor penningtoni, the Pennington's skolly, is a butterfly of the family Lycaenidae. It is found in South Africa, where it is known from the Western Cape, from the Swartberg Pass along the Great Swartberg, Elandsberg north of Seweweekspoort, the Keeromsberg and Waboomsberg, as well as the Hex River Mountains.

The wingspan is 26–37 mm for males and 32–41 mm for females. Adults are on wing from late October to November. There is one generation per year.
