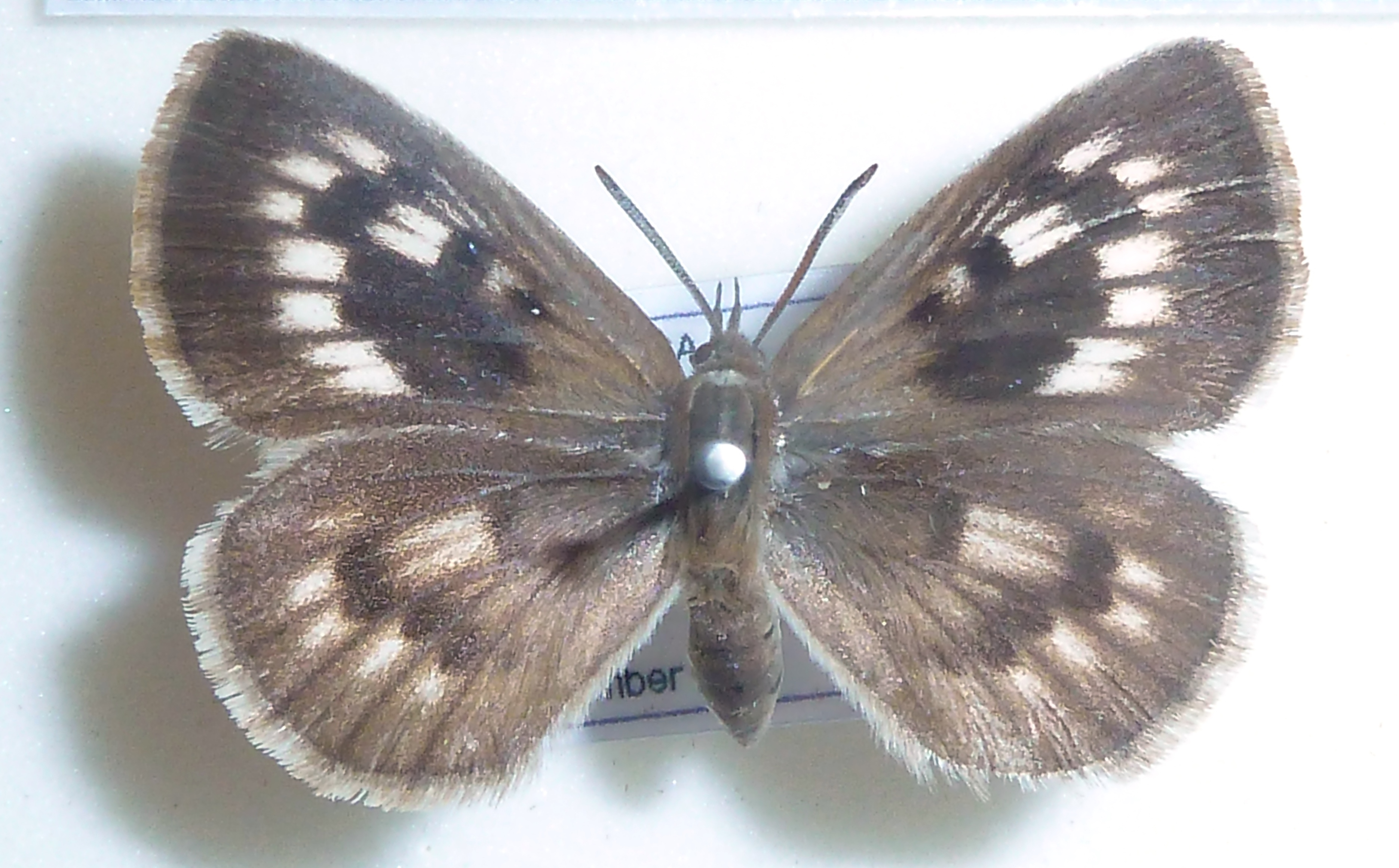
- Thestor basutus basutus

Scientific classification
- Domain: Eukaryota
- Kingdom: Animalia
- Phylum: Arthropoda
- Class: Insecta
- Order: Lepidoptera
- Family: Lycaenidae
- Genus: Thestor
- Species: T. basutus

Binomial name
- Thestor basutus (Wallengren, 1857)

Synonyms
- Zeritis basuta Wallengren, 1857; Zeretis zaraces Hewitson, 1874

= Thestor basutus =

Species of butterfly

Thestor basutus, the Basuto skolly or Basuto magpie, is a butterfly of the family Lycaenidae. It is found in South Africa, Botswana and Zimbabwe.

The wingspan is 30–39 mm for males and 35–42 mm for females. Adults are on wing from October to November and from February to April. There is one generation per year.

== Subspecies ==
- Thestor basutus basutus (East Cape to Lesotho, the KwaZulu-Natal midlands, the Orange Free State, the North West Province and North Cape, Botswana, eastern Zimbabwe)
- Thestor basutus capeneri Dickson, 1972 (Gauteng and, Limpopo Province and Mpumalanga)
