= Thestor barbatus =

Conservation status
- Critically Endangered (IUCN 3.1)

Scientific classification
- Kingdom: Animalia
- Phylum: Arthropoda
- Class: Insecta
- Order: Lepidoptera
- Family: Lycaenidae
- Genus: Thestor
- Species: T. barbatus

Binomial name
- Thestor barbatus Henning & Henning, 1997

Species of butterfly

Thestor barbatus, the bearded skolly, is a butterfly of the family Lycaenidae. It is found in South Africa, where it is only known from the West Cape in Nama Karoo at the Paardenberg and in the northern foothills of the Outeniqua Mountains.

The wingspan is 32–38 mm for males and 36–40 mm for females. Adults are on wing in December. There is one generation per year.
