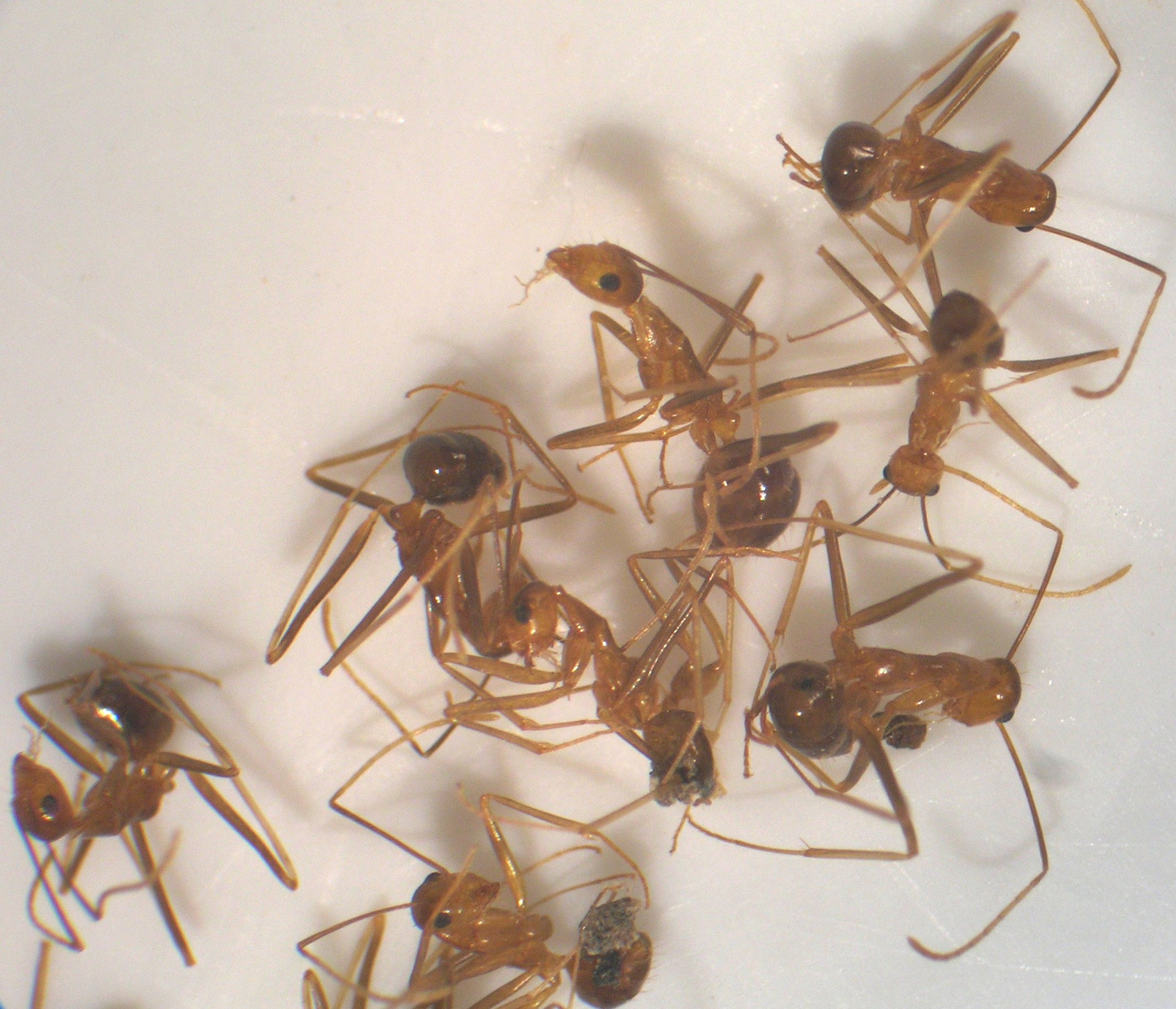
- A. gracilipes

Scientific classification
- Domain: Eukaryota
- Kingdom: Animalia
- Phylum: Arthropoda
- Class: Insecta
- Order: Hymenoptera
- Family: Formicidae
- Subfamily: Formicinae
- Tribe: Plagiolepidini
- Genus: Anoplolepis; Santschi, 1914

Type species
- Formica longipes Jerdon, 1851

Diversity
- 9 species

Synonyms
- Zealleyella Arnold, 1922

= Anoplolepis =

Genus of ants

Anoplolepis, also known as the "pugnacious ants", is a genus of ants in the subfamily Formicinae and tribe Lasiini. The genus is mainly found in the Afrotropics, with a few native species known from the Malagasy and Oriental regions (and some introduced in other places).

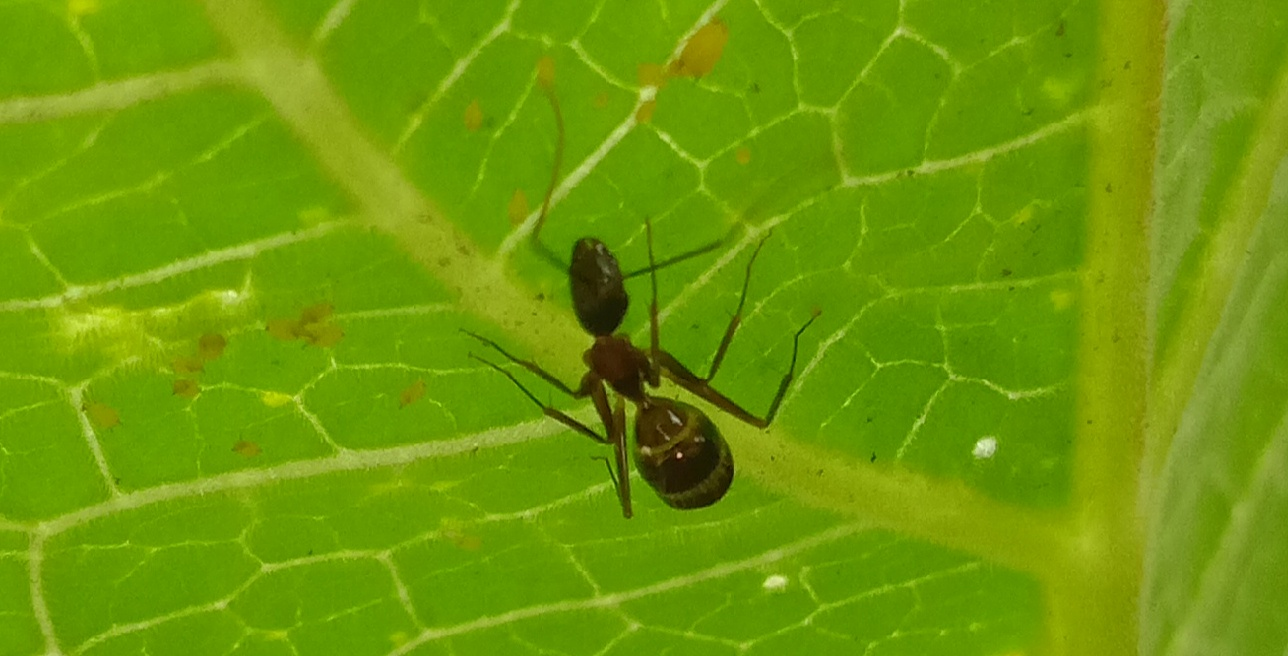
A pugnacious ant (Anoplolepis) captured in India

== Species ==
- Anoplolepis carinata (Emery, 1899)
- Anoplolepis custodiens (Smith, 1858)
- Anoplolepis fallax (Mayr, 1865)
- Anoplolepis gracilipes (Smith, 1857)
- Anoplolepis nuptialis (Santschi, 1917)
- Anoplolepis opaciventris (Emery, 1899)
- Anoplolepis rufescens (Santschi, 1917)
- Anoplolepis steingroeveri (Forel, 1894)
- Anoplolepis tenella (Santschi, 1911)
