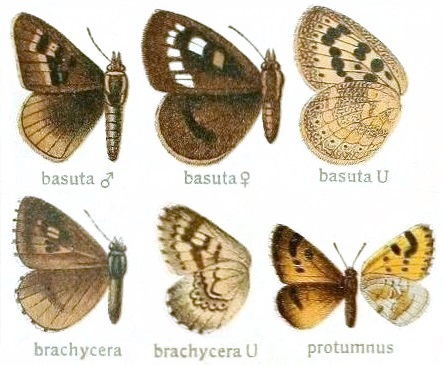
- T. basutus, T. brachycerus & T. protumnus

Scientific classification
- Domain: Eukaryota
- Kingdom: Animalia
- Phylum: Arthropoda
- Class: Insecta
- Order: Lepidoptera
- Family: Lycaenidae
- Subfamily: Miletinae
- Tribe: Lachnocnemini
- Genus: Thestor; Hübner, [1819]

Synonyms
- Arrugia Wallengren, 1872

= Thestor =

Butterfly genus in family Lycaenidae

Thestor is a genus of butterflies in the family Lycaenidae. The species are Afrotropical.

== Species ==
- Thestor barbatus Henning & Henning, 1997 – bearded skolly
- Thestor basutus (Wallengren, 1857) – Basuto skolly, Basuto magpie
- Thestor brachycerus (Trimen, 1883) – Knysna skolly
- Thestor braunsi van Son, 1941 – Braun's skolly
- Thestor calviniae Riley, 1954 – Hantamsberg skolly
- Thestor camdeboo Dickson & Wykeham, 1994 – Camdeboo skolly
- Thestor claassensi Heath & Pringle, 2004 – Claassen's skolly
- Thestor compassbergae Quickelberge & McMaster, 1970 – Compassberg skolly
- Thestor dicksoni Riley, 1954 – Dickson's skolly
- Thestor dryburghi van Son, 1966 – Dryburgh's skolly
- Thestor holmesi van Son, 1951 – Holmes's skolly
- Thestor kaplani Dickson & Stephen, 1971 – Kaplan's skolly, Kaplan's thestor
- Thestor montanus van Son, 1941 – mountain skolly
- Thestor murrayi Swanepoel, 1953 – Murray's skolly
- Thestor overbergensis Heath & Pringle, 2004 – Overberg skolly
- Thestor penningtoni van Son, 1949 – Pennington's skolly
- Thestor petra Pennington, 1962 – rock skolly
- Thestor pictus van Son, 1941 – Langeberg skolly
- Thestor pringlei Dickson, 1976 – Pringle's skolly
- Thestor protumnus (Linnaeus, 1764) – Boland skolly
- Thestor rileyi Pennington, 1956 – Riley's skolly
- Thestor rooibergensis Heath, 1994 – Rooiberg skolly
- Thestor rossouwi Dickson, 1971 – Rossouw's skolly
- Thestor stepheni Swanepoel, 1968 – Stephen's skolly
- Thestor strutti van Son, 1951 – Strutt's skolly
- Thestor vansoni Pennington, 1962 – Van Son's skolly
- Thestor yildizae Koçak, 1983 – peninsula skolly
