= Thestor calviniae =

Conservation status
- Least Concern (IUCN 3.1)

Scientific classification
- Kingdom: Animalia
- Phylum: Arthropoda
- Class: Insecta
- Order: Lepidoptera
- Family: Lycaenidae
- Genus: Thestor
- Species: T. calviniae

Binomial name
- Thestor calviniae Riley, 1954

Species of butterfly

Thestor calviniae, the Hantamsberg skolly, is a butterfly of the family Lycaenidae. It is found in South Africa, where it is only known from montane fynbos in the foothills and at the summit of the Hantamsberg near Calvinia.

The wingspan is 30–34 mm for males and 38–42 mm for females. Peaks in flight times occur in December at lower altitudes and from March to April on the summit of the Hantamsberg. There is one generation per year.
