= Thestor overbergensis =

Conservation status
- Least Concern (IUCN 3.1)

Scientific classification
- Kingdom: Animalia
- Phylum: Arthropoda
- Class: Insecta
- Order: Lepidoptera
- Family: Lycaenidae
- Genus: Thestor
- Species: T. overbergensis

Binomial name
- Thestor overbergensis Heath & Pringle, 2004

Species of butterfly

Thestor overbergensis, the Overberg skolly, is a butterfly of the family Lycaenidae. It is found in South Africa, where it is only known from coastal fynbos between Ou Plaas and De Hoop in the Western Cape.

The wingspan is 33–38 mm for males and about 44 mm for females. Adults are on wing from November to December.
