= Thestor vansoni =

Conservation status
- Least Concern (IUCN 3.1)

Scientific classification
- Kingdom: Animalia
- Phylum: Arthropoda
- Class: Insecta
- Order: Lepidoptera
- Family: Lycaenidae
- Genus: Thestor
- Species: T. vansoni

Binomial name
- Thestor vansoni Pennington, 1962

Species of butterfly

Thestor vansoni, the Van Son's skolly, is a butterfly of the family Lycaenidae. It is found in South Africa, where it is found in the Nama Karoo just below the peaks of the Gydoberg, the Skurweberg and the Cederberg in the Western Cape.

The wingspan is 24–29 mm for males and 27–34 mm for females. Adults are on wing from the September to November, with a peak in October. There is one generation per year.
