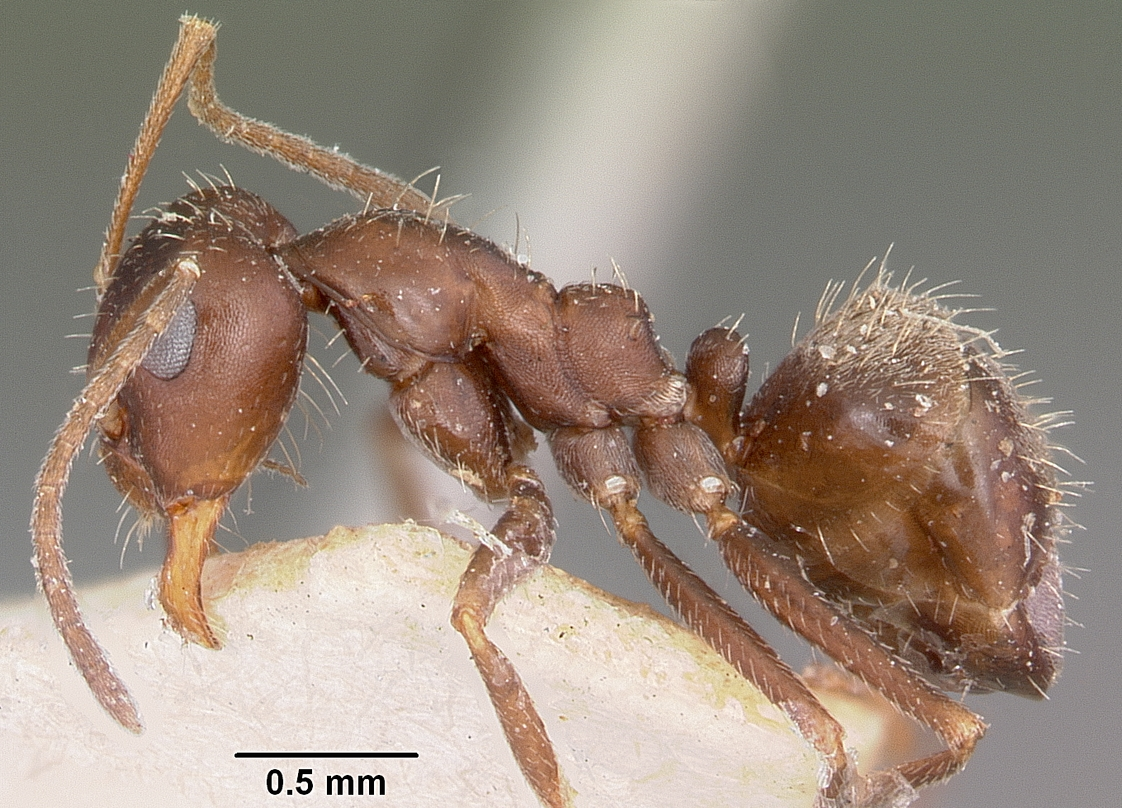
- Anoplolepis steingroeveri

Scientific classification
- Kingdom: Animalia
- Phylum: Arthropoda
- Clade: Pancrustacea
- Class: Insecta
- Order: Hymenoptera
- Family: Formicidae
- Subfamily: Formicinae
- Genus: Anoplolepis
- Species: A. steingroeveri

Binomial name
- Anoplolepis steingroeveri (Forel, 1894)

= Anoplolepis steingroeveri =

Species of ant

Anoplolepis steingroeveri is a species of ant. It is commonly known as the black pugnacious ant. It is native to southern Africa, and occurs in South Africa, Lesotho, Botswana and Namibia. The worker is similar in appearance to darker morphs of the common pugnacious ant (Anoplolepis custodiens), but that species has a chequer-board-like dark pattern on the gaster, which is caused by reflection of light by pubescent hairs which lie in different directions on the two sides.
