= Compassberg =

Mountain in South Africa

- Kompasberg
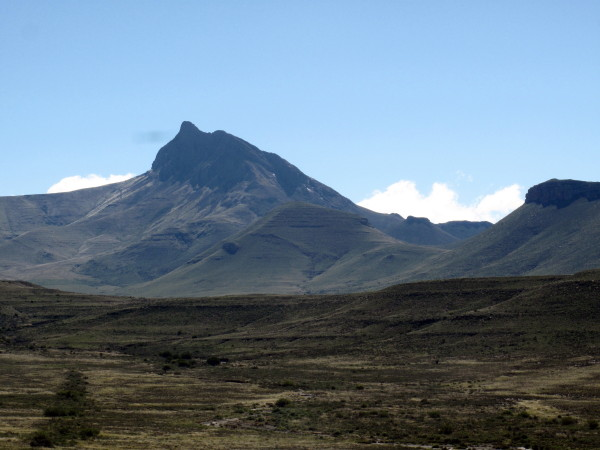

Highest point
- Elevation: 2,502 m (8,209 ft)
- Prominence: 1,012 m (3,320 ft)
- Listing: List of mountains in South Africa
- Coordinates: 31°45′26″S 24°32′22″E

Naming
- Native name: Kompasberg

Geography
- Location within South Africa
- Location: Eastern Cape
- Parent range: Sneeuberge

Compassberg (Afrikaans: Kompasberg), is a mountain peak of the Sneeuberge range in South Africa. It is located 55 km due north of Graaff-Reinet in the Eastern Cape Province. At 2502 metres, it is the highest peak in South Africa outside the Stormberg-Drakensberg massif. It was named by Colonel Robert Jacob Gordon when he accompanied Governor Joachim van Plettenberg on a journey to the eastern frontier of the Cape Colony in 1778.

The mountain is composed of sediments of the Beaufort Series in the Karoo System, and extensively intruded by dolerite dikes and sills.

== Gallery ==
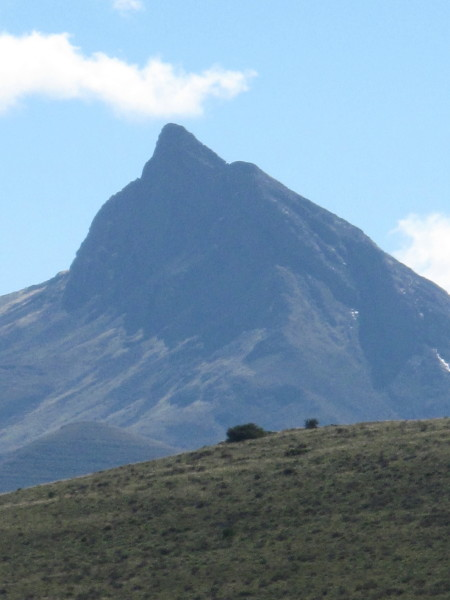
Kompasberg prominence

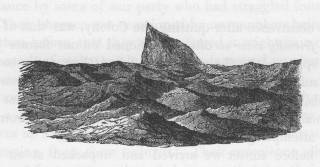
Burchell's illustration of Kompasberg
