= Sneeuberge =

Mountain range near Nieu-Bethesda, Eastern Cape, South Africa

Coordinates: 31.75°S 24.6°E

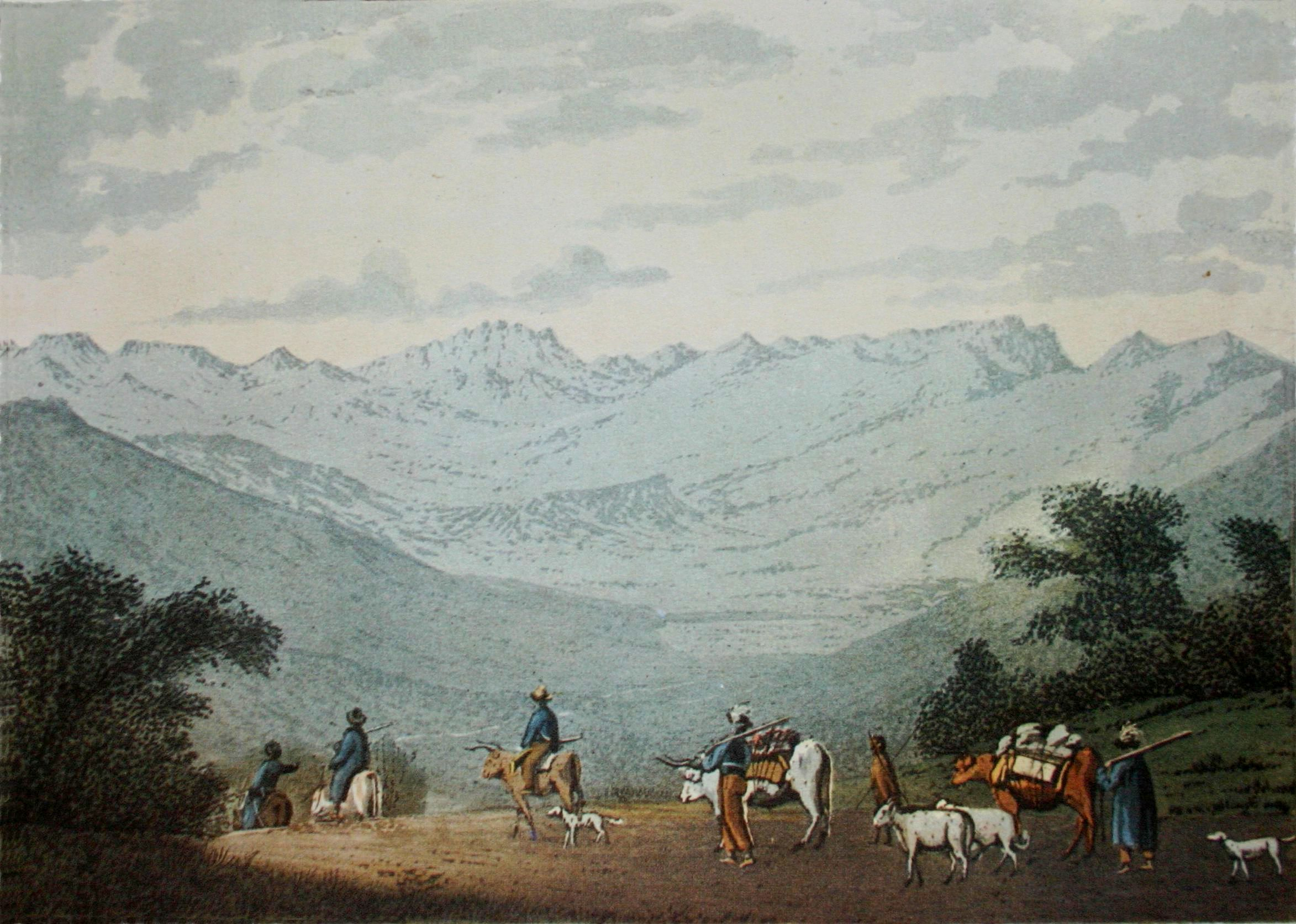
Descending from the Snow Mountains, a scene near Graaff-Reinet, by William Burchell

The Sneeuberge or Sneeuberg mountain range was historically known as “Sneeuwbergen”, meaning ‘snow mountains’ in Cape Dutch, and refers to a significant portion of Southern Africa's Great Escarpment in the Cradock, Murraysburg, Richmond, Graaff-Reinet, Nieu-Bethesda and Middelburg districts of the Great Karoo, most of which are in the Eastern Cape Province.

They are geologically part of the Karoo System and fall within the Karoo semi-arid climatic region. As their name suggests, the mountains have frigid winters, with occasional snowfalls during strong cold fronts. Summers are hot with some late afternoon thunderstorms. The highest peak, called Kompasberg (2502m) (Afrikaans for Compass Mountain), is north of the small village of Nieu-Bethesda and dominates all surrounding areas with its prominent steep-sided height.

== Geology ==
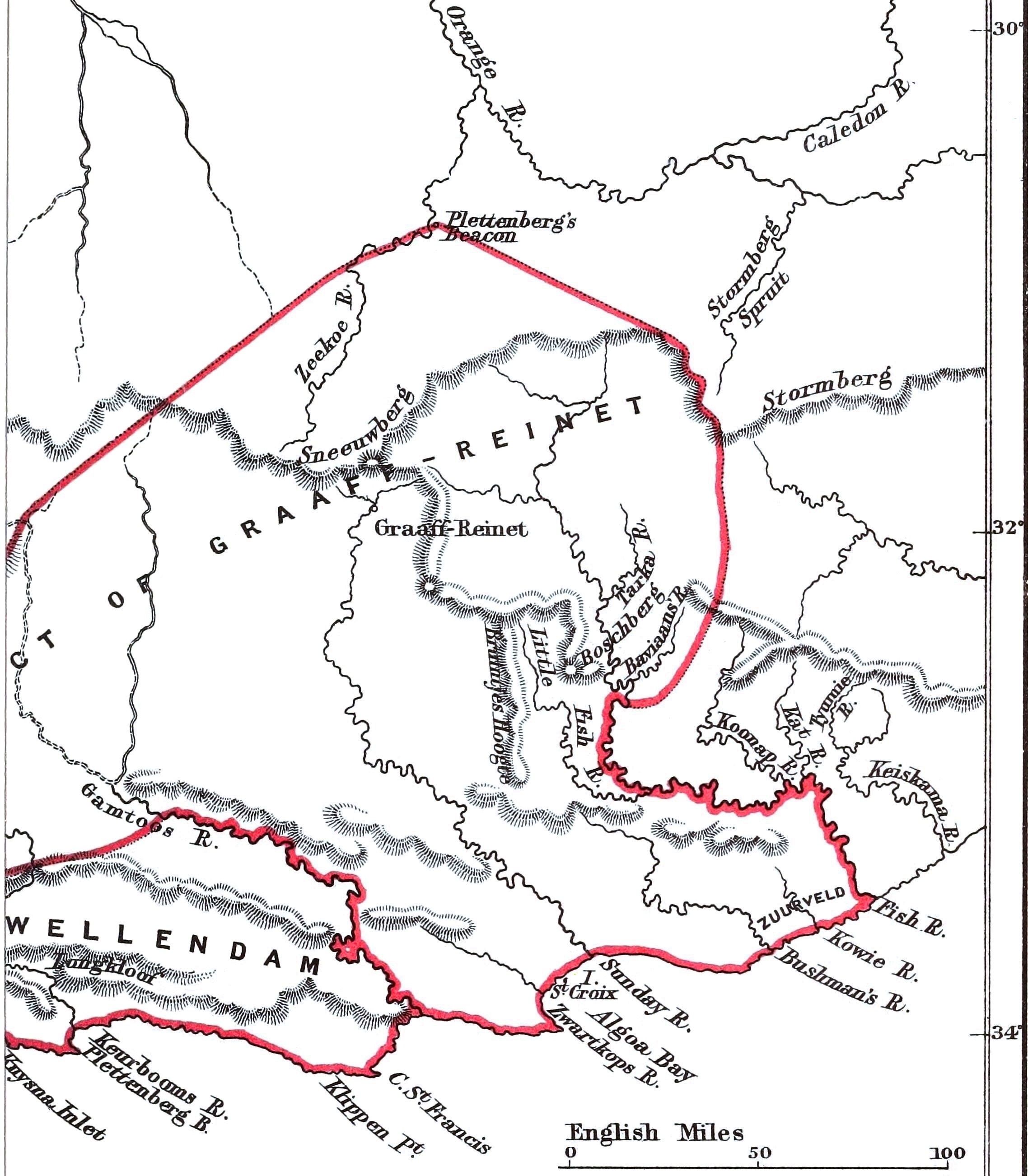
Map of the Sneeuberge in the District of Graaff-Reinet, reflecting the political boundaries of 1795

The Sneeuberg's underlying rock consists mostly of dolerite sill, dyke, basin, laccolith and rock sheets that have intruded into the older Beaufort Group sandstone and mudstone of the Karoo Supergroup. Metamorphic rock made up of hornfels and quartzite are found along the contact zones between the sedimentary strata and the dolerite intrusions.

Sneeuberg's four major peaks all stand as pyramids above the 2100 m plateau. The highest peaks are found in the Great Escarpment west of the Eastern Cape Drakensberg. The 2504 m high Compassberg is one of the highest free-standing peaks outside of the Drakensberg Massif and Lesotho Highlands in Southern Africa. The four peaks are all generally capped with angular boulders believed to have been formed by mechanical weathering from frost action.

The range forms a mountain arc that stretches about 200 km in length. From west to east, it is made up of the Onder-Sneeuberg, Kamdebooberge, Meelberg, Koudeveldberge, Toorberg, Winterhoekberge, Compassberg, Lootsberg, Renosterberg, AgterRenosterberg, Wapadsberg, Nardousberg, Tandjiesberg, Coetzeesberg, Bankberg, Aasvoëlkrans, Groot Bruintjieshoogde and Boschberg.

The mountain range is separated from the Nuweveldberge (the western Great Escarpment) by Nelspoort Interval formed by the Gouritz–Kariega drainage basin, and by the Great Fish River valley from the Great Winterberg–Amatola mountains (the eastern Great Escarpment).

== Vegetation ==
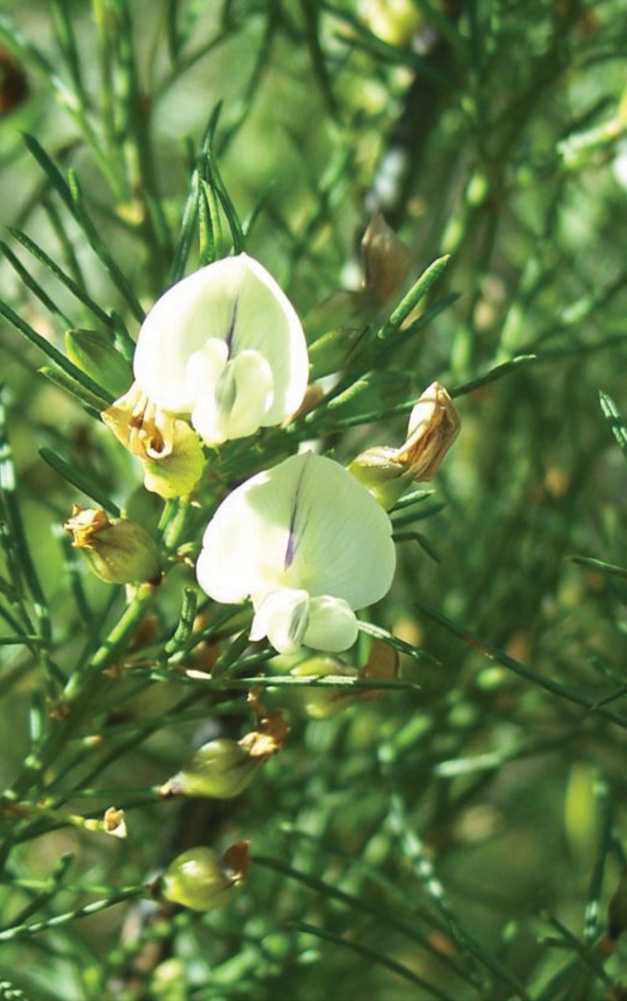
Psoralea margaretiflora, an endemic plant of the Sneeuberge

The area is a meeting place for several biomes because of the major climatic, topographic and geological changes. These are namely the grassland, Nama Karoo, forest, Albany thickets, azonal and fynbos biome.

In 2008, Sneeuberge was home to 1195 flora species. 107 (9%) were alien species, 33 (2.8%) were endemic and 13 (1.1%) were near-endemic. Five species previously reported as Drakensberg Alpine Centre pervasive plants are now known to occur in the Sneeuberg. Situated close to the Cape Floristic Region, a centre of endemism, Sneeuberge is a subcentre for endemism, featuring several pervasive plant species.

The mountain's primary land-use was previously largely livestock grazing because of its richness in grass species. The grasslands situated in higher altitudes is used for cattle and the shrublands in lower altitudes are used for sheep and goats. Concentrated grazing and watering of livestock on local farms has resulted in the deterioration of the area's vegetation. What was once extensive wetland in lower altitudes has been eroded out and no longer functions as farming.
