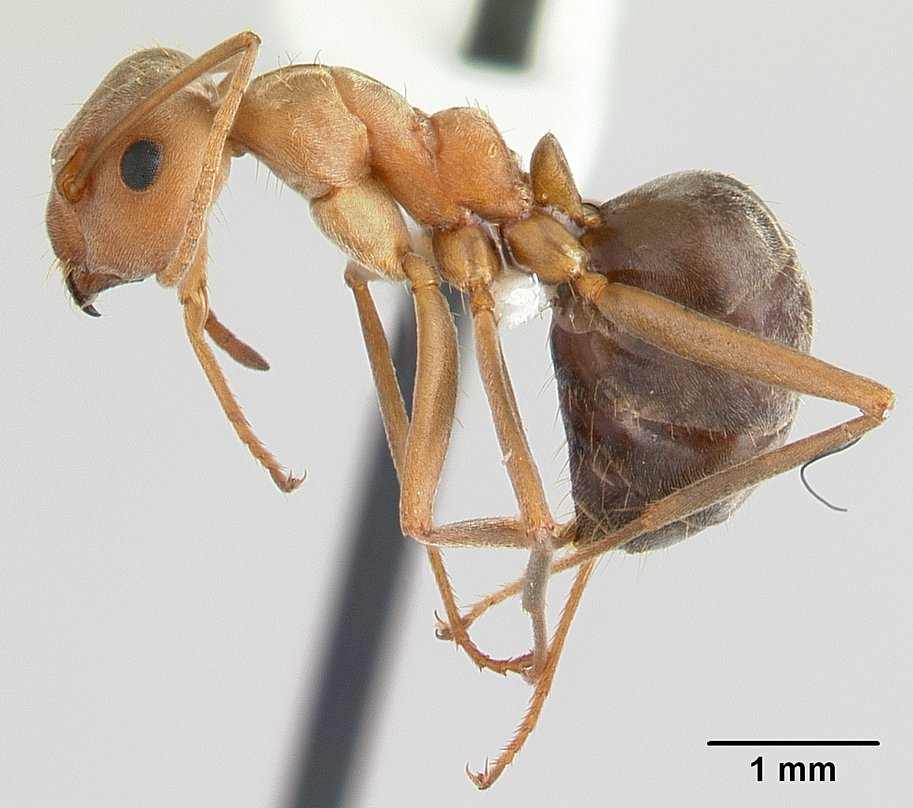
- Anoplolepis custodiens worker

Scientific classification
- Kingdom: Animalia
- Phylum: Arthropoda
- Clade: Pancrustacea
- Class: Insecta
- Order: Hymenoptera
- Family: Formicidae
- Clade: Doryloformicia
- Subfamily: Formicinae
- Tribe: Plagiolepidini
- Genus: Anoplolepis
- Species: A. custodiens

Binomial name
- Anoplolepis custodiens F. Smith, 1858

= Anoplolepis custodiens =

Species of ant

Anoplolepis custodiens, commonly known as the common pugnacious ant, is a species of ant in the genus Anoplolepis, native to central and southern Africa. Individual ants may come in a range of colors and sizes. Found in dry and cultivated areas, it is an important source of prey for some pangolins and aardvarks. Although generally aggressive, ants from other colonies of Anoplolepis custodiens are not attacked.

== Description ==
The worker common pugnacious ant varies greatly in size and is up to 10 mm (0.4 in) long, and polymorphic, being yellowish-brown, reddish-brown or darker chocolate-brown, often with the abdomen darker than the rest of the ant. Darker individuals can be distinguished from the black pugnacious ant (Anoplolepis steingroeveri) by the chequer-board dark pattern on the gaster, which is caused by reflection of light by pubescent hairs which lie in different directions on the two sides.

== Distribution and habitat ==
This ant is native to tropical sub-Saharan Africa. Its range includes Angola, Botswana, Democratic Republic of Congo, Eswatini, Ethiopia, Lesotho, Mozambique, Namibia, South Africa, Tanzania, Zambia, Zanzibar and Zimbabwe. It is a terrestrial species living in dry, open habitats such as the Karoo in South Africa, and is found in cultivated areas and vineyards.

== Ecology ==
Anoplolepis custodiens is a very aggressive ant and tends to dominate ant communities wherever it is found; nevertheless, it has been shown to be tolerant towards ants of its own species from other colonies. This fact may facilitate its invasive expansion locally. It is a generalist feeder on dead and living animal material, nectar and honeydew. It has been found that both larger and smaller workers forage on the ground, whereas it is almost exclusively smaller workers that forage in bushes, indicating the possibility of workers adopting size-related roles.

A study of pangolins in Sabi Sand Game Reserve in South Africa showed that they fed exclusively on ants and termites and that A. custodiens constituted 77% of their diet, mostly dug out from shallow subterranean locations. Similarly, A. custodiens forms a high proportion of the diet of aardvarks, being the most prominent prey species, but this largely reflects the fact that it is the most abundant ant species in the area.
