= Greyton =

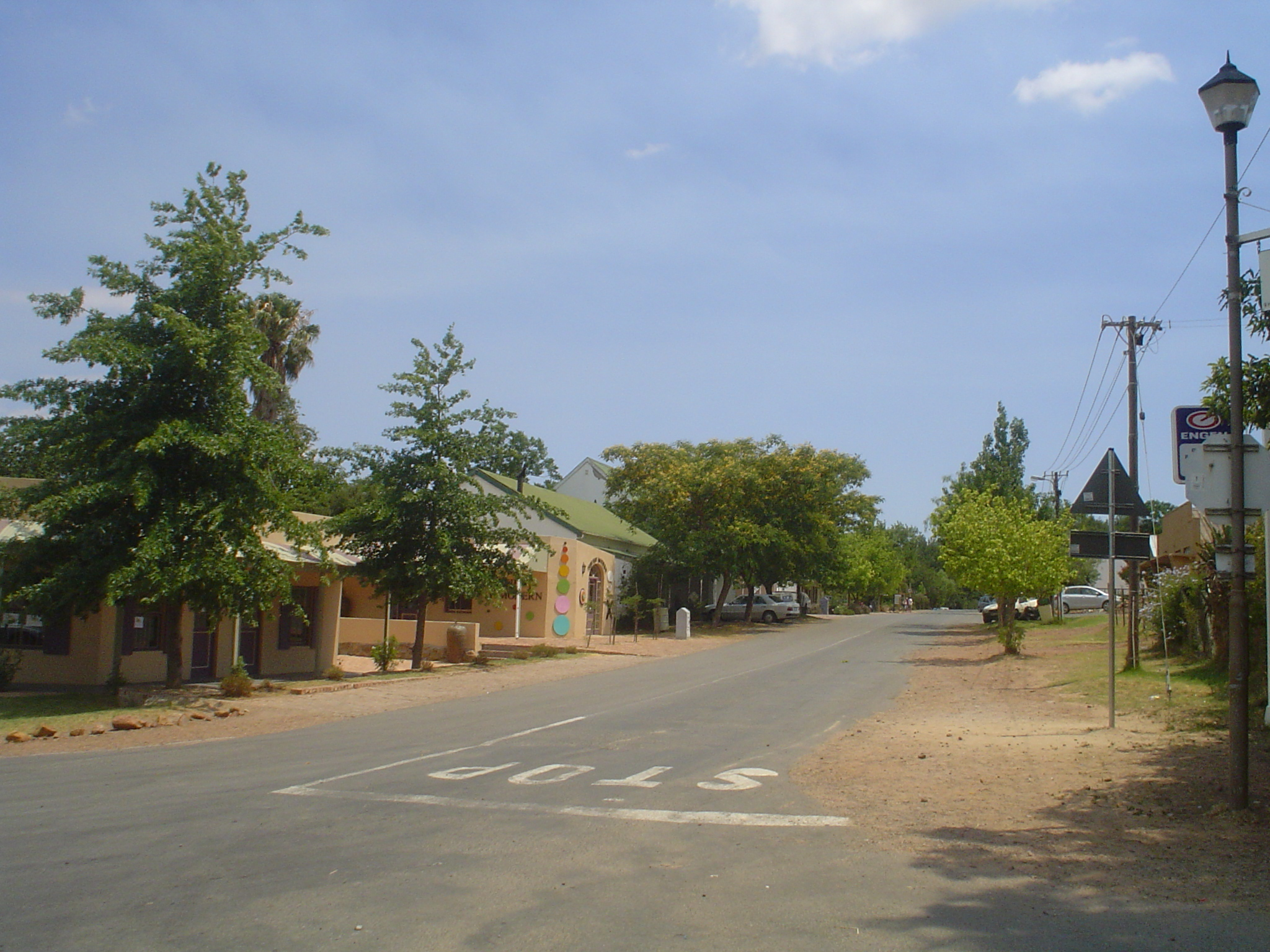
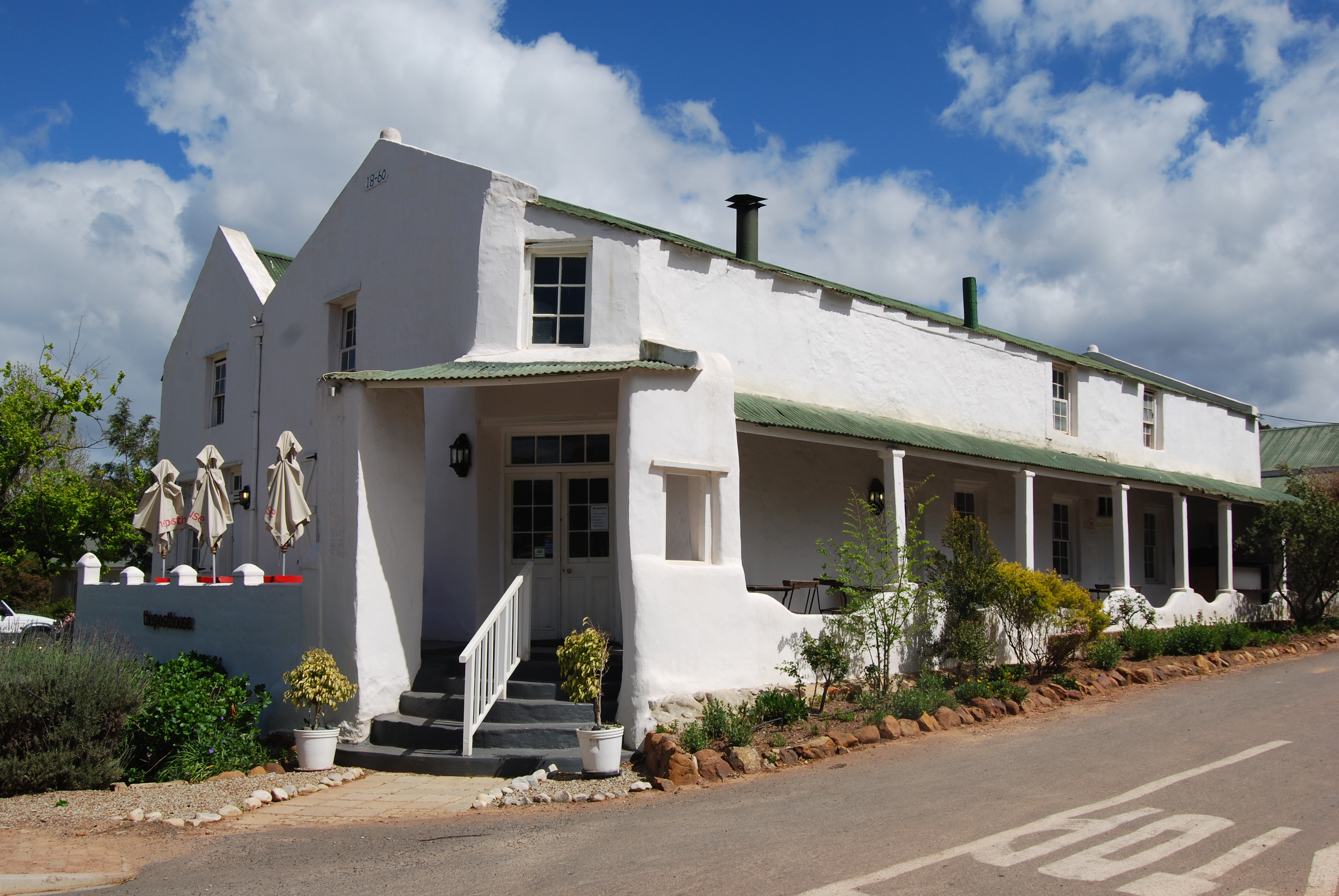
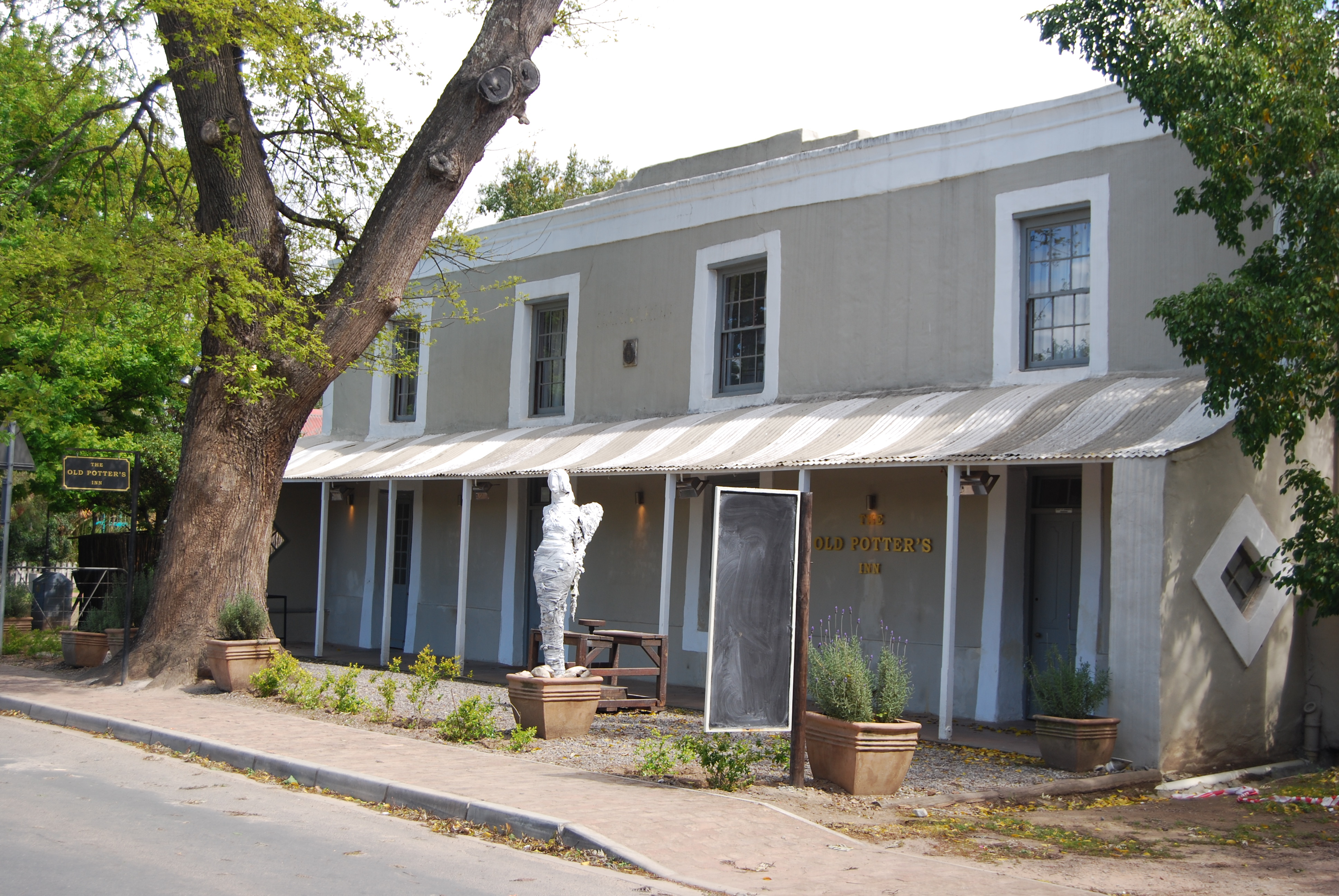
- Top:The 5 way stop at the centre of town, Old Posthouse (left), Old Potter's Inn (right)

- Location within Western Cape Location within South Africa
- Coordinates: 34°3′S 19°37′E
- Country: South Africa
- Province: Western Cape
- District: Overberg
- Municipality: Theewaterskloof

Area
  - Total: 2.89 km^{2} (1.12 sq mi)

Population (2011)
  - Total: 2,780
  - Density: 962/km^{2} (2,490/sq mi)

Racial makeup (2011)
  - Black African: 4.9%
  - Coloured: 69.2%
  - Indian/Asian: 0.8%
  - White: 24.0%
  - Other: 1.1%

First languages (2011)
  - Afrikaans: 74.2%
  - English: 22.0%
  - Other: 3.8%
- Time zone: UTC+2 (SAST)
- Postal code (street): 7233
- PO box: 7233
- Area code: 028

Greyton is a small town in the Overberg area in the Western Cape, South Africa.

== Early history ==
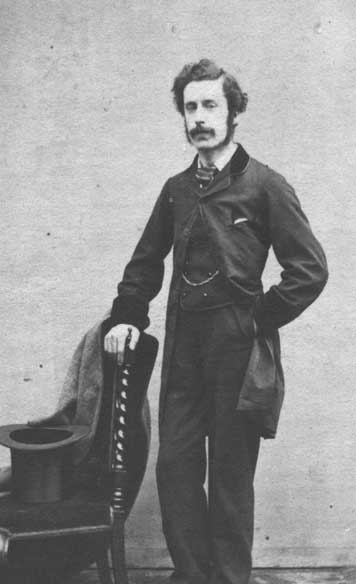
Sir George Grey

Before Greyton was established in 1854, the verdant plains and forested ravines of the area were home to the Hessequas Khoikhoi tribe who had their kraals near the Gobos river, which they named after their ancestral chief. Their many thousands of cattle and sheep were the reason why Ensign Schriver of the Castle of Good Hope was sent here in the late 1600s to barter with their head man, Captain Stoffel Koekson. So rich did Koekson become from this bartering that he eventually took his people to live in the Boschmanskloof, where he built them proper mud-brick houses, the foundations of which still lie under the old houses of Boschmanskloof today.

== Weltevreden farm ==
In 1793, Koekson's tribal lands were given to the young Dutchman, Marthinus Theunissen, who built a homestead (no longer standing) on his farm Weltevreden. He did not stay long because he could not resolve the constant disputes with his neighbours at Boschmanskloof and Genadendal over boundaries and straying cattle.

Subsequent owners of Weltevreden included two wealthy brothers of the famous Cloete family from Constantia who bred horses. Marthinus Theunissen himself became a very wealthy man in Stellenbosch, owning Vergelegen at one time.

== Agricultural village ==
In 1846 a wealthy Englishman, Herbert Vigne, bought Weltevreden. He established a freehold agricultural village on Weltevreden in 1854, keeping two small portions for himself and bequeathing the remainder of the farm as commonage. He named the village "Greyton", after Sir George Grey, the then Governor of the Cape.

=== Village layout ===
The layout of the village was designed and set out by J G Rietz, a senior surveyor at the time, and remains essentially the same with only a few changes and additions through the years. The variously sized properties were made available to buyers of any race, nationality or religion at affordable prices. This was the only town in the Cape in which such land with full title deeds, water rights and grazing rights was for sale to anyone.

In the 1860s, Herbert married a young girl of British stock named Elizabeth Belshaw – 27 years his junior. They settled on their farm, De Bos, in the village (subdivided by his heirs after his death in 1895). Within fifty years, a dedicated community of people had built houses, established businesses and smallholdings, opened a school and built two churches in the town. Here they lived together in peace, harmony and religious tolerance.

== Surviving features ==
Many of the town's original buildings and features have survived, including the original leiwater (irrigation) system of street furrows, the town kraal and dipping tank, a blacksmith's house and forge, the school's boarding house and the extensive public commonage crisscrossed by walking, hiking and cycling paths that surround the town. There are also two old churches, along with some of the earliest cottages built between 1854 and 1860 in Vigne Lane and at the end of Vlei Street, together with an old shepherd's cottage built prior to 1840, which is now incorporated into "The Old Potter's Inn" building on Greyton's Main Road.

== Village changes ==
The entrance to the town was not originally where it is today for the road came directly from Genadendal over the hill, and past Boschmanskloof, entering the town at the intersection of Main Road and Ds Botha Street. There, the De Villiers family built a trading store in 1860, as well as several communion rooms used by Dutch Reformed Church members who came to town for communion once a month. The town's first post office was opened in the building where The Post House pub trades from today.

== Economy ==
Following Herbert Vigne's death in 1895, Greyton, like many Overberg towns, lived through harsh economic times that characterised the turn of the century. Many people left to make their fortunes elsewhere. Sending crops to Cape Town for sale was no longer viable. There were few jobs, families were large and people became impoverished. But the long narrow plots that defined the layout of the town continued to provide a food source for families, as well as a place to keep livestock for domestic use.

The Vigne descendants subdivided more land at the present entrance to the town, on which several large Victorian houses were built and still stand today. Opposite them, a very old flat-roofed building that was used for the first Anglican church services, was made into a Moravian school. It is now the town library.

== Group Areas Act ==
During the 1950s, the town was torn apart by the implementation of the Group Areas Act. Coloured families who had lived together for a century with neighbours of all races, were forced to sell their homes and farmland. Some left the town for good. Others relocated to new houses in the town at Heuwelkroon. Many of these families are still living there and remain part of the Greyton community

== Modern Greyton ==
Greyton retains much of its Cape Vernacular architectural heritage. The town is a weekend and holiday destination noted for its preserved historic buildings alongside modern amenities.

Greyton has served as a filming location for music video productions and as a venue for international sporting events. The town provided the backdrop for What the Sea Gives (The Sea Takes), a 2023 music video by Israeli musician Omer Goshen, directed by South African videographer Bella Russell Greyton has also hosted stages of the Absa Cape Epic, an annual mountain-biking race, most recently in 2026.

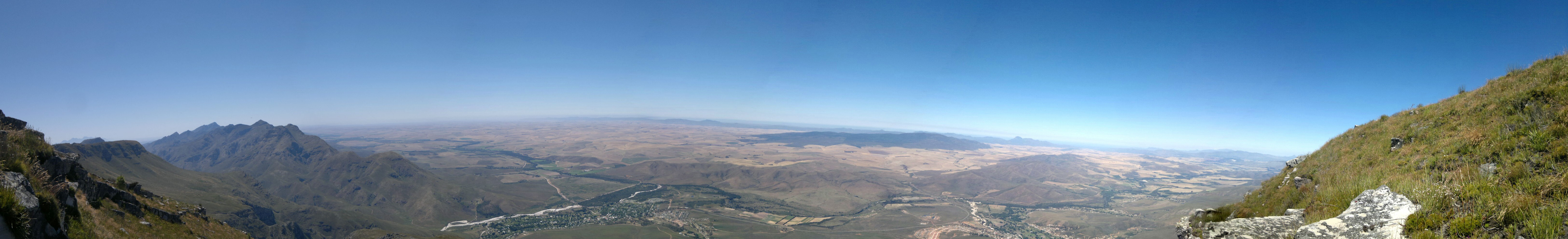
Panoramic view of Greyton
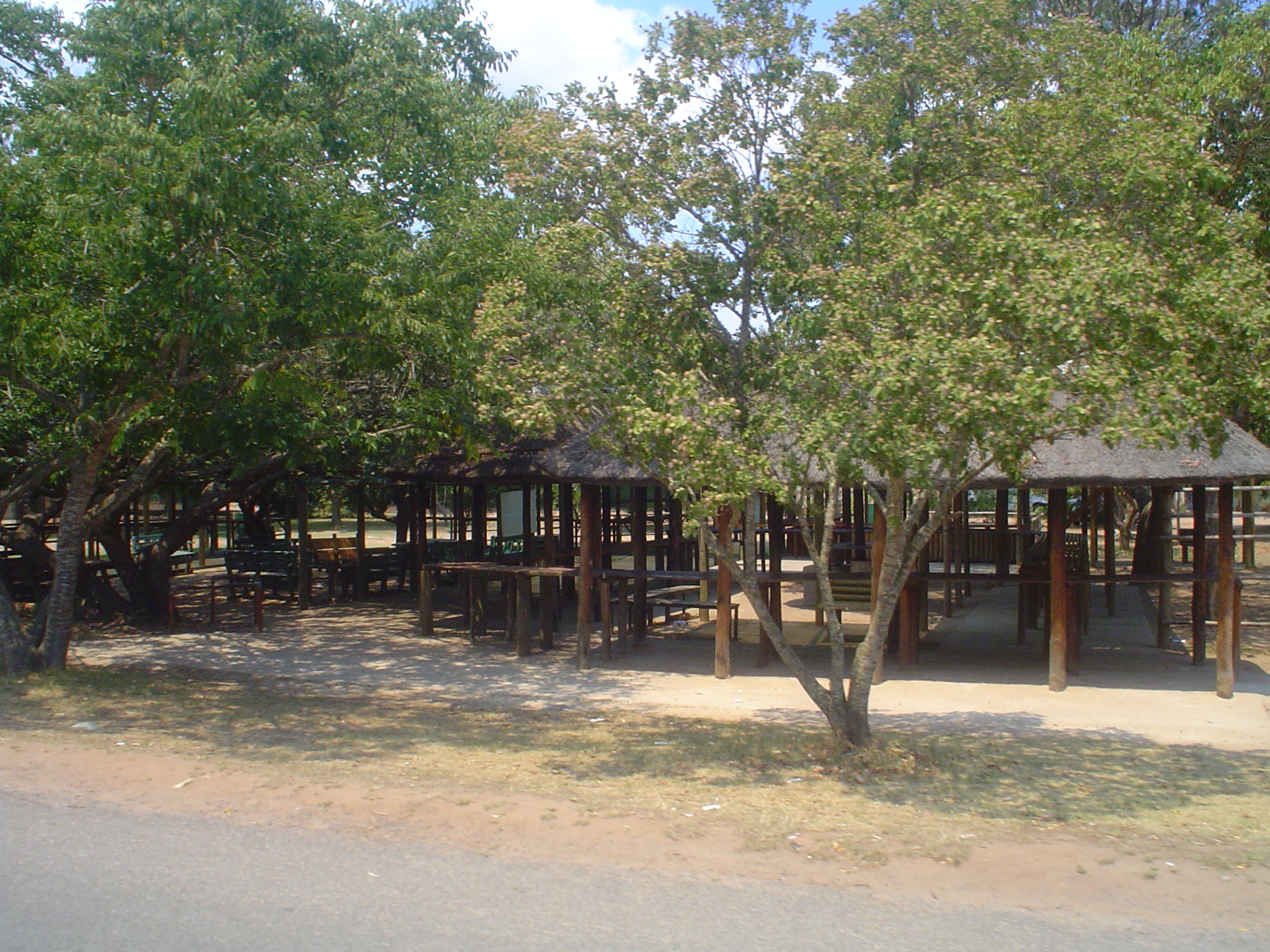
Greyton market place

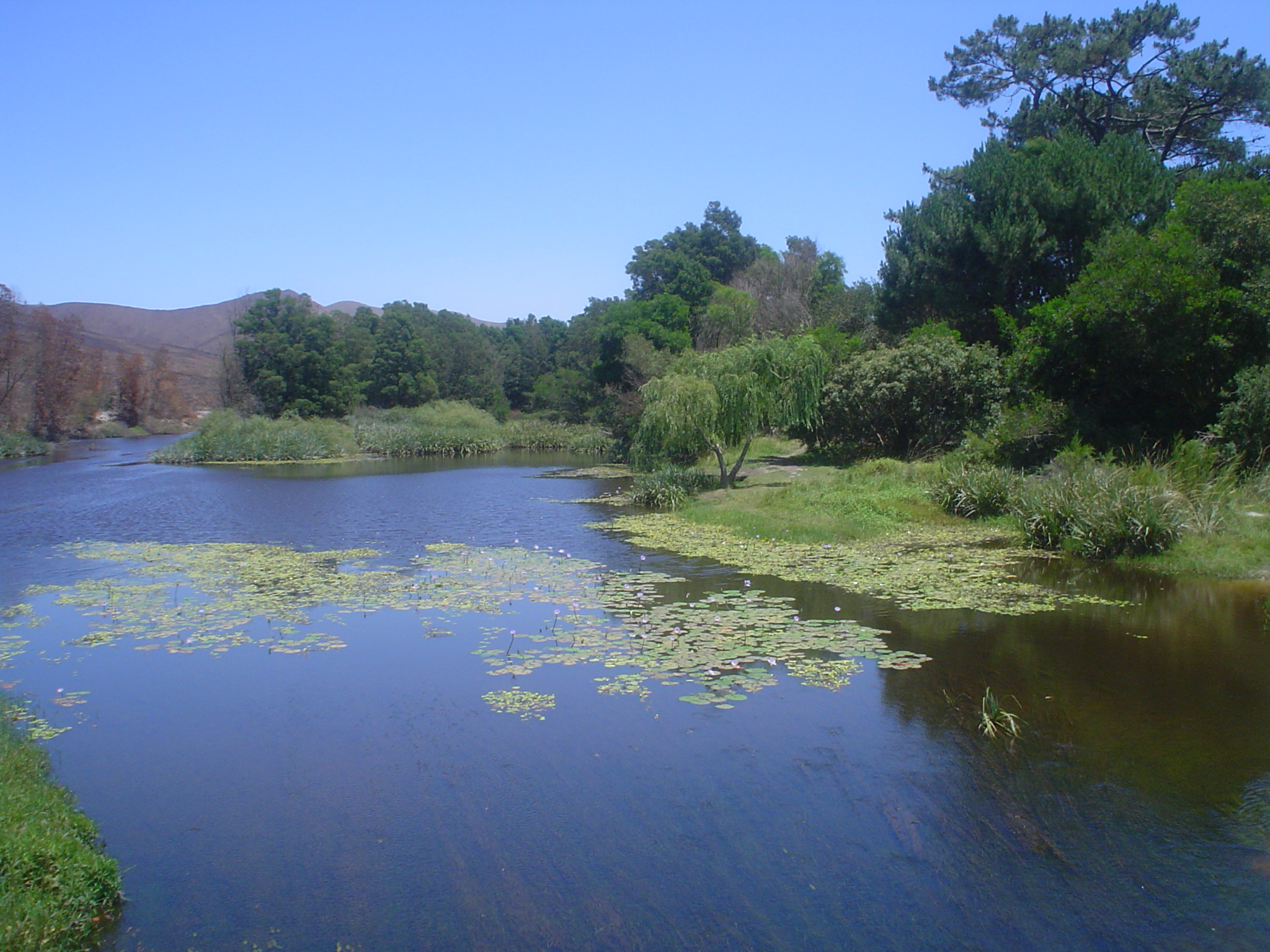
The Sonderend River

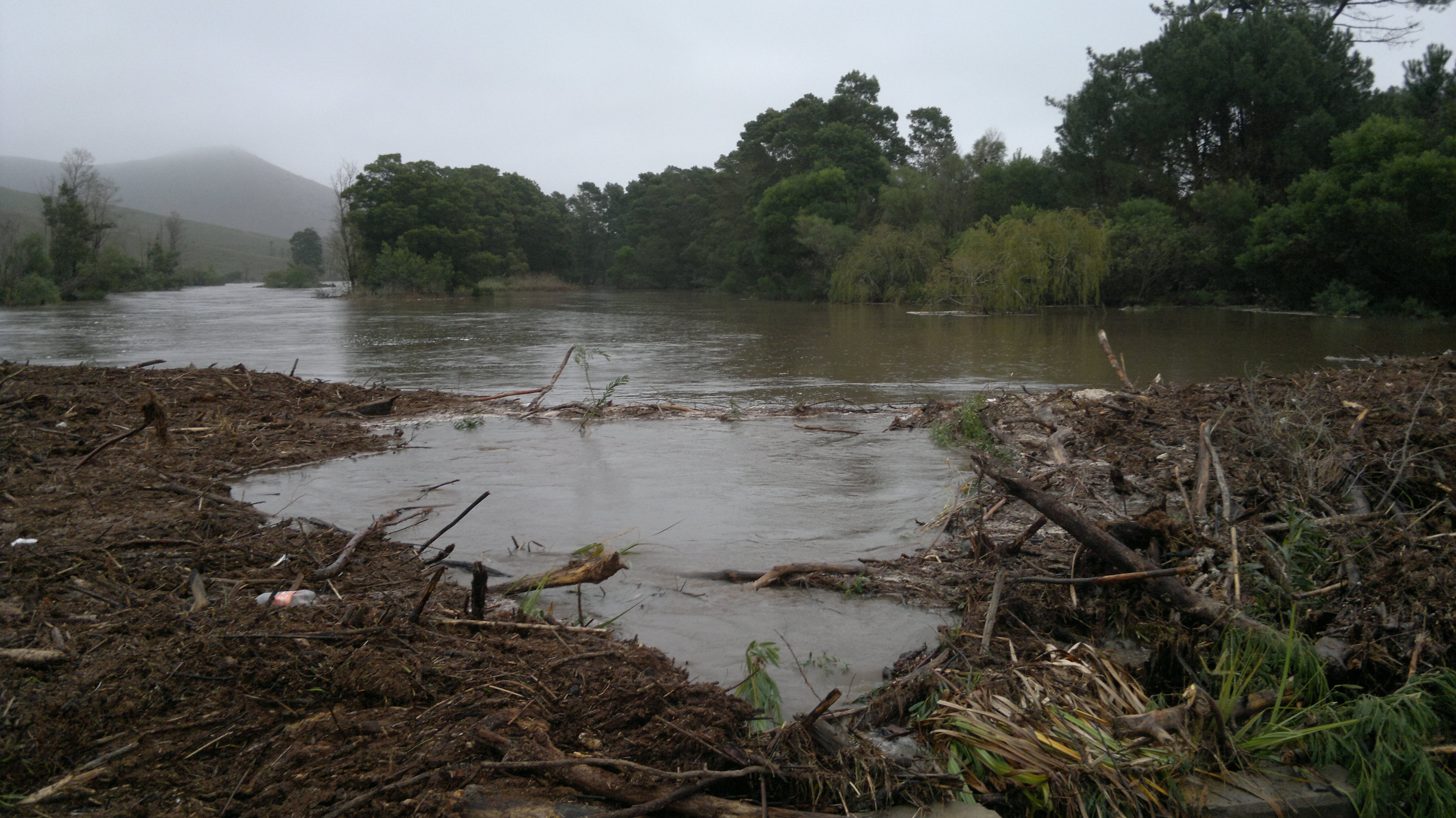
The Sonderend river in flood
