= Clayson =

Clayson may refer to:

Surname

- Alan Clayson (born 1951), singer-songwriter, music biographer, journalist, solo entertainer
- Billy Clayson (1897–1973), English footballer
- Carol Anne Clayson, American oceanographer
- Esther Clayson or Esther Pohl Lovejoy (1869–1967), American physician, public-health pioneer, suffrage activist, congressional candidate
- Oliver Clayson (born 1980), English cricketer
- Percy Jack Clayson MC, DFC, a British Flying Ace in World War I credited with twenty-nine victories
- William Clayson (1840–1887), Latter-day Saint hymnwriter born in England

Given name

- Clayson Benally, member of Blackfire, a Navajo (Diné) traditionally-influenced musical group
- Clayson Henrique da Silva Vieira (born 1995), Brazilian footballer
- Clayson Queiroz (born 1978), Brazilian footballer
- Jane Clayson Johnson, Emmy-winning journalist and author
- Wayne Clayson Booth (1921–2005), American literary critic

Other

- George Clayson House, restored Second Empire home built in 1873 in Palatine Road, Palatine, IL, USA

== See also ==
- Claesson
- Clason (disambiguation)
- Clauson
- Clawson (disambiguation)
- Claystone
