= Claesson =

Claesson is a surname. Notable people with the surname include:

- Åke Claesson (1889–1967), Swedish film actor
- Emma Claesson (born 1977), Swedish orienteering competitor
- Ester Claesson (1884–1931), Swedish landscaping pioneer
- Fredrik Claesson (born 1992), Swedish ice hockey player
- Hannah Claesson (born 1991), Swedish footballer
- Johan Claesson (born 1981), Swedish footballer
- Leif Claesson (photographer) (born 1959), Swedish photographer and actor
- Mattias Claesson (born 1986), Swedish middle-distance runner
- Michael Claesson (born 1965), Swedish Army officer
- Stig Claesson (1928–2008), Swedish writer, visual artist, and illustrator
- Viktor Claesson (born 1992), Swedish footballer

== See also ==
- Claesson Koivisto Rune, Swedish multidisciplinary design/architecture office based in Stockholm, Sweden
