= Leif Claesson =

Leif Claesson may refer to:

- Leif Claesson (photographer)
- Leif Claesson (footballer), Swedish footballer
