= Clawson =

Clawson may refer to:

- Clawson (surname)
- The travel cost method of economic valuation, also called the Clawson method

== Places ==
In the United States

- Clawson, Idaho, an unincorporated community
- Clawson, Michigan, a suburban city north of Detroit
- Clawson, Texas, an unincorporated community
- Clawson, Utah, a town

Elsewhere

- Long Clawson, a small village in Leicestershire, England, United Kingdom

== See also ==
- Clawson codes, an alphanumeric system of prioritizing and classifying 911 medical calls
