= Clawson (surname) =

Clawson is a surname of English Origin. Notable people with the surname include:

- Adam Clawson (1972–2017), American slalom canoeist
- Augusta Clawson (1903–1997), American author of Shipyard Diary of a Woman Welder
- Curt Clawson (born 1959), American politician
- Cynthia Clawson (born 1948), American gospel singer
- Dan Clawson (1948–2019), American sociologist
- Dave Clawson (born 1967), American football player and coach
- Del M. Clawson (1914–1992), American politician
- John Clawson (1944–2018), American basketball player
- John T. Clawson (1945–2011), American politician
- John Willard Clawson (1858–1936), American Artist
- Ken W. Clawson (1936–1999), American journalist and spokesman for U.S. President Richard Nixon
- L.D. Clawson (1885–1937), American cinematographer
- Patrick Clawson (born 1951), American economist
- Rodney Clawson, American country music songwriter
- Rudger Clawson (1857–1943), American LDS Church official
- Terry Clawson (1940–2013), English rugby league player
- Tim Clawson (born 1960), American film and television producer, film studio executive and screenwriter
