= Collofino =

German writer and cigar maker (1867–1947)

Josef Feinhals (1867–1947), aka Collofino, was a German cigar and cigarette maker, patron of the arts, and writer from Cologne. Under his pseudonym, he wrote Non Olet ("It does not stink"), an 1,100-page scatological collection (1939). He was a good friend of Hermann Hesse and assisted Hesse in some of his projects. His pseudonym, Collofino, is Italian for "slender neck", an approximate translation of his real name, "Feinhals".

== Patron of the arts ==
Feinhals is praised as an important supporter of the expressionist movement in the Rhineland, having contributed to the 1906 Art Exhibit in Cologne. His company also supported individual artists, such as his friend, the poet Johannes Theodor Kuhlemann (1891-1939), who had worked for eight years in Feinhals's "tobacco museum." Kuhlemann subsequently wrote a book on tobacco, Vom Tabak, which Feinhals published in 1936.

== Feinhals and Hesse ==
Feinhals was a friend of Hermann Hesse, who had stayed in his Marienburg villa in 1914. Hesse made a number of (sometimes oblique) references to him and the antiquarian anecdotes he had collected in Die Geschichten des Collofino, a book privately published in 1918. In Hesse's short story "Journey to the East," the character "Collofino der Rauchzauberer" ("Collofino the Smoke Magician") is based on Feinhals. In turn, Feinhals helped Hesse with translating German passages into Latin for Hesse's magnum opus, The Glass Bead Game, for which he is thanked and named as "Collof."

== Books authored ==
In 1911 Feinhals authored "Der Tabak in kunst und kulture".

Die Geschichten des Collofino (1918) is a collection of anecdotes and observations. Privately published by the author and printed by Dumont Schauberg in Cologne, the book is very rare.

Non Olet, privately published in 1939 under the pseudonym Collofino, is a "rare eccentric compilation on scatology and smoking, with songs and verse." The "thousand page compendium and discussion" is representative of what has been called "a strong anal component in [the German] national character." The book contains anecdotes and observations, a number of which Collofino claims to have gleaned from old German chronicles. It also includes the proposal for a society which should occupy itself with various matters related to feces. For instance, the society should study the fart as "a natural phenomenon, a problem in pneumatics, an acoustic phenomenon, an insult, a means of defense, an educator," and in "its dependence on other functions, its relation to the cosmos, in literature, in society, in politics, in its relation with subordinates," as well as "among the church fathers."

== Villa in Marienburg ==
Feinhals lived in a villa designed by Joseph Maria Olbrich, built 1908-1909, completed by Bruno Paul, and destroyed in World War II. Here he had a noteworthy collection of modern art on display. Artworks in collection included Ernst Kirchner's Das Boskett, which was seized by the Nazis as "Degenerate Art" after Feinhals donated it to the Wallraf-Richartz Museum in Cologne.

== Works by Collofino ==
- Das Geheimnis der Marchesa oder Giorgione da Castel Franco. N.p. 1918.
- Die Geschichten des Collofino: Eine Sammlung merkwürdiger Begebenheiten und rätselhaften Abenteuer, märchenhafter Schilderungen und höchst seltsamer Beobachtungen aus dem Leben von Menschen und Tieren aller Zeiten, Länder, und Zonen. Cologne: N.p. 1918.
- Non olet oder Die heiteren Tischgespräche des Collofino über den Orbis Cacatus nebst den neuesten erkenntnistheoretischen Betrachtungen über das Leben in seiner phantastischen Wirklichkeit erzählt von ihm selbst. Cologne: N.p. 1939.
