= A Walk in the Sun (1978 film) =

- Directed by: Hans Dahlberg
- Screenplay by: Bibi Edlund
- Based on: En vandring i solen 1976 novel by Stig Claesson
- Produced by: Bengt Forslund
- Starring: Gösta Ekman; Inger Lise Rypdal; Margaretha Krook
- Cinematography: Roland Lundin
- Edited by: Wic' Kjellin
- Music by: Rolf Lindblom
- Production company: Treklövern
- Distributed by: Europafilm
- Release date: 25 November 1978
- Running time: 100 minutes
- Country: Sweden
- Language: Swedish
- Budget: 2 million SEK

A Walk in the Sun (Swedish: En vandring i solen) is a 1978 Swedish drama film directed by Hans Dahlberg and starring Gösta Ekman, Inger Lise Rypdal and Margaretha Krook. At the 15th Guldbagge Awards, Sif Ruud won the award for Best Actress. The film was based on a 1976 novel by Stig Claesson.

== Premise ==
An unsettled Swedish sports writer tries to escape from his relationship problems and the Swedish winter by taking a package holiday to Cyprus in the Mediterranean.

== Cast ==
- Gösta Ekman as Tore
- Inger Lise Rypdal as Marion
- Margaretha Krook as Ellen
- Sif Ruud as Siv
- Margareta Byström as Ulla
- Irma Christenson as Vera
- Kjerstin Dellert as Lady from Sala
- Mihalis Giannatos as waiter
- Kenneth Haigh as George
- Ragnar Pelka Hansson as Swede
- Dimitris Ioakeimidis as taxi driver
- Kostas Kastanas as doctor
- Nikos Kouros as optician
- Staffan Liljander as Erik
- Kimon Mouzenidis as hairdresser
- Konstantina Savvidi as grape woman
- Grigorios Siskos as police sergeant

== Production ==
The film was the first to be directed by Hans Dahlberg himself.

The film was shot between 13 April and 31 May 1978 in Stockholm Arlanda Airport and in the seaside resort of Loutraki, near Corinth in Greece.

The world premiere occurred at the Saga theatre in Stockholm on 25 December 1978, the age limit being 11.
