= Johannes Theodor Kuhlemann =

German journalist and author

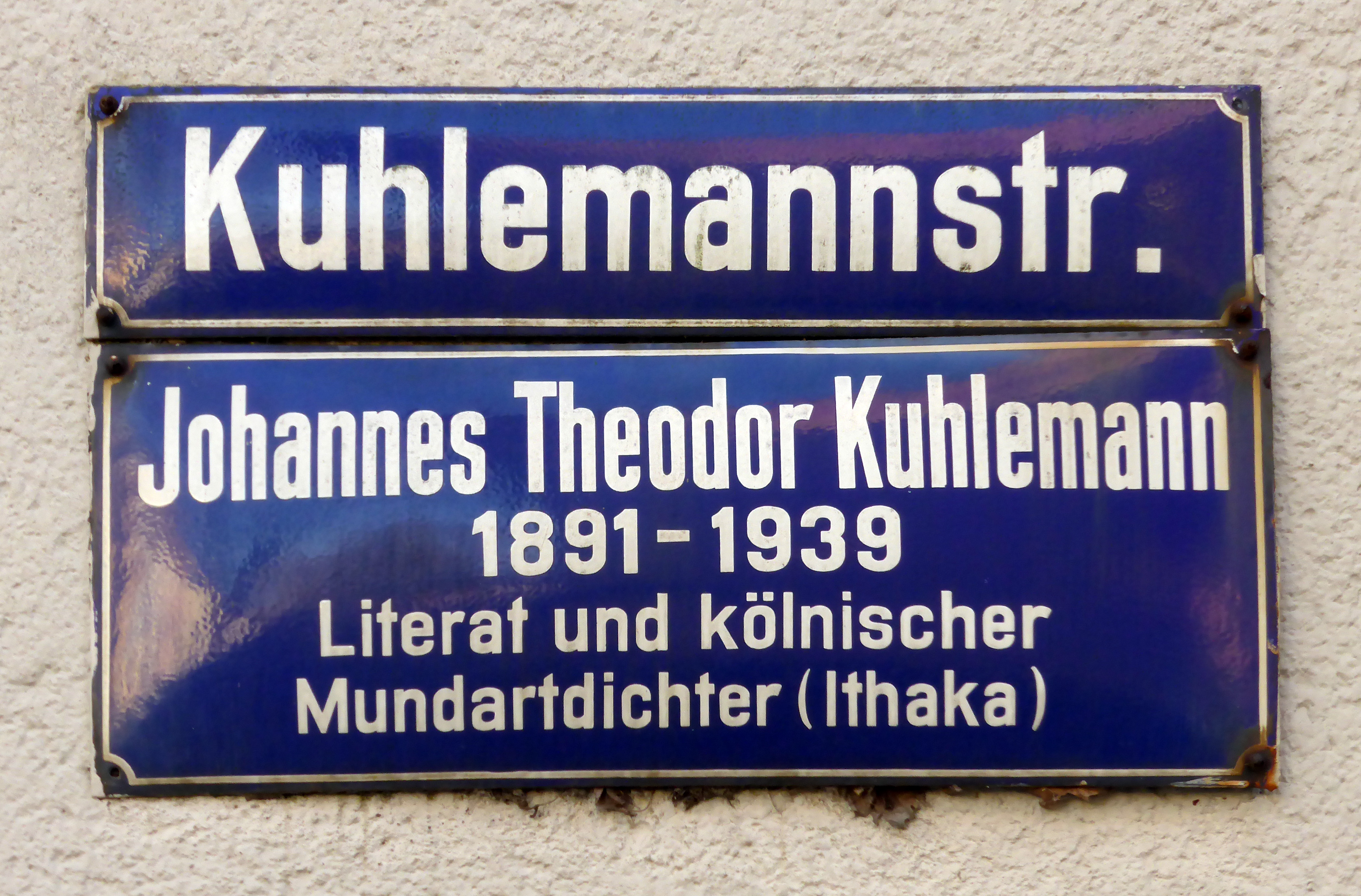
Kuhlemannstraße in Cologne

Johannes Theodor Kuhlemann (born: November 4, 1891 in Cologne-Ehrenfeld; died: March 9, 1939 in Cologne) was a German journalist, cabaret artist and writer in the Cologne dialect.

== Early life ==
Kuhlemann worked as an editor and music critic in Saarbrücken for several years after the First World War. After his return to Cologne, he worked in the secretary's office of the tobacco merchant and writer Josef Feinhals (pseudonym Collofino)) and in the Tobacco Museum as a cultural historian. Kuhlemann studied the history, literature, art and music of Europe and mastered seven foreign languages.

== Books and poetry ==
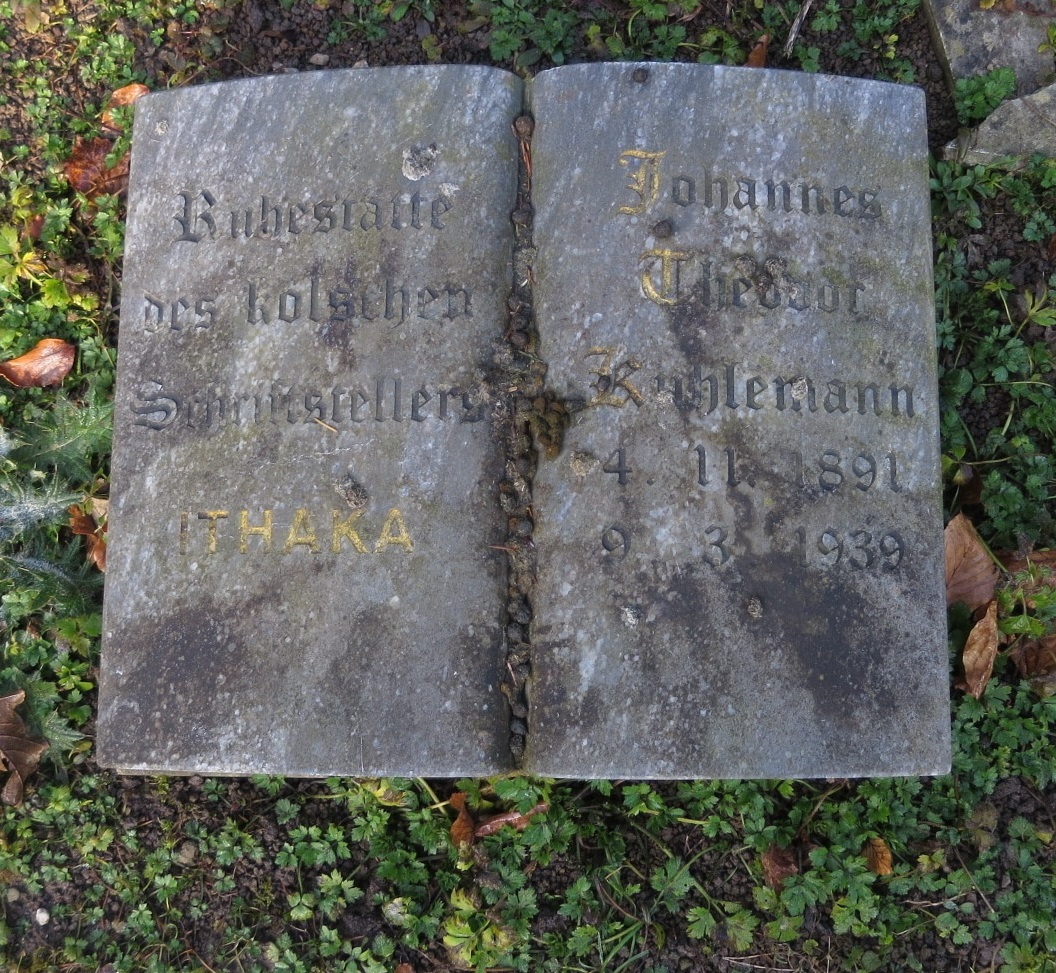
Grave memorial stone at Cologne South Cemetery

He was inspired to write Cologne dialect poetry by the actor, director and theater director Franz Goebels, who had founded the "Theater des werktätigen Volkes" “ in Cologne and with whom he collaborated on the revue D'r zweite halve Hahn. Promoted by Otto Brües, he published numerous Cologne poems. He also published several cultural-historical articles in the Kölner Stadt-Anzeiger. Kuhlemann enjoyed great popularity through his lectures and readings in Cologne.

In 1919, Kuhlemann published Consolamini, Dichtungen, which included five drawings by Max Ernst. These were the first book illustrations by the artist who was still unknown at the time. The book was not a commercial success and most of the print run, published by Karl Nierendorf's Kairos Verlag, was pulped.

Kuhlemann belonged to a circle of artist and poets in Cologne. His cycle of poems Landschaften was set to music by Erwin Schulhoff in 1919. Kuhlemann published many of his works under the pseudonym "Ithaka", composed of the first letters of his name J.Th.K.

He was supported financially by his friend Josef Feinhals, who employed Kuhlemann for eight years in his "Tobacco Museum". and published in 1936 Kuhlemann's book VomTabak.

== Legacy ==
The city of Cologne commemorates Kuhlemann with the Kuhlemannstraße in the district Altstadt-Süd.

His grave in Cologne's South Cemetery (Flur 71) was removed in the early 1990s when the lease expired. Local historians later had a memorial stone erected at the original gravesite.

== Publications ==
- Der Alldach eß vun Wundere voll. Hrsg. Joseph Klersch. Pick, Köln 1954.
- Consolamini. Gedichte. Kairos, Cöln-Ehrenfeld 1919.
- D’r zweite halve Hahn. Revue. 1928.
- Kölsche Rheinfahrt. 1935.
- Vom Tabak. Hrsg. J. Feinhals. 1936.
- Bibliophile Parabel. Bibliophilen-Gesellschaft, Köln 1937.
- Köln. Werbeschrift. 1939.
- Die Aktion. Gedicht.
- Saturn. Gedicht.
- Der Strom. Gedicht.
- Die Mitschuldigen: Oper in zwei Akten (Goethe), bearbeitet von Johannes Theodor Kuhlemann, (1918–920, unvollständig) (WV 47)
