= Scatology =

Study of faeces

In medicine and biology, scatology or coprology is the study of faeces. Scatological studies allow one to determine a wide range of biological information about a creature, including its diet (and thus where it has been), health and diseases such as tapeworms.

A comprehensive study of scatology was documented by John Gregory Bourke under the title Scatalogic Rites of All Nations (1891), with a 1913 German translation including a foreword by Sigmund Freud. An abbreviated version of the work was published as The Portable Scatalog in 1994.

== Etymology ==
The word derives from the Greek σκῶρ (GEN σκατός) meaning "dung, feces"; coprology derives from the Greek κόπρος of similar meaning.

== Psychology ==
In psychology, a scatology is an obsession with excretion or excrement, or the study of such obsessions.

In sexual fetishism, scatology or scatophilia (usually abbreviated scat) refers to coprophilia, when someone is sexually aroused by fecal matter, whether in the use of feces in various sexual acts, watching someone defecating, or simply seeing the feces. Entire subcultures in sexuality are devoted to this fetish.

== Literature ==
In literature, "scatological" is a term to denote the literary trope of the grotesque body. It is used to describe works that make particular reference to excretion or excrement, as well as to toilet humor. Well known for his scatological tropes is the late medieval fictional character of Till Eulenspiegel. Another common example is John Dryden's Mac Flecknoe, a poem that employs extensive scatological imagery to ridicule Dryden's contemporary Thomas Shadwell. German literature is particularly rich in scatological texts and references, including such books as Collofino's Non Olet. A case which has provoked an unusual amount of comment in the academic literature is Mozart's scatological humour. Smith, in his review of English literature's representations of scatology from the Middle Ages to the 18th century, notes two attitudes towards scatology. One of these emphasises the merry and the carnivalesque. This is found in Chaucer and Shakespeare. The other attitude is one of self-disgust and misanthropy. This is found in the works of the Earl of Rochester and Jonathan Swift.

== See also ==
- Coprolite – fossilized faeces
- Coprophilia – faeces fetish
- Stool sample – sample of faeces for studying
- Urolagnia – urination fetish

== Sources ==
- Bakhtin, Mikhail, Rabelais and His World.
- Lewin, Ralph, Merde: excursions in scientific, cultural and socio-historical coprology. Random House, 1999. ISBN 0-375-50198-3.
- Susan Gubar, "The Female Monster in Augustan Satire." Signs 3.2 (Winter, 1977): 380–394.
- Jae Num Lee, Swift and Scatological Satire. University of New Mexico Press, 1971. ISBN 0-8263-0196-7.
- Smith, Peter J. (2012) Between Two Stools: Scatology and its Representation in English Literature, Chaucer to Swift, Manchester University Press
- Henderson, Jeffrey (1991). The Maculate Muse: Obscene Language in Attic Comedy. Oxford University Press. ISBN 0-19-506685-5.
