= Ester Claesson =

Swedish landscaping pioneer (1884–1931)

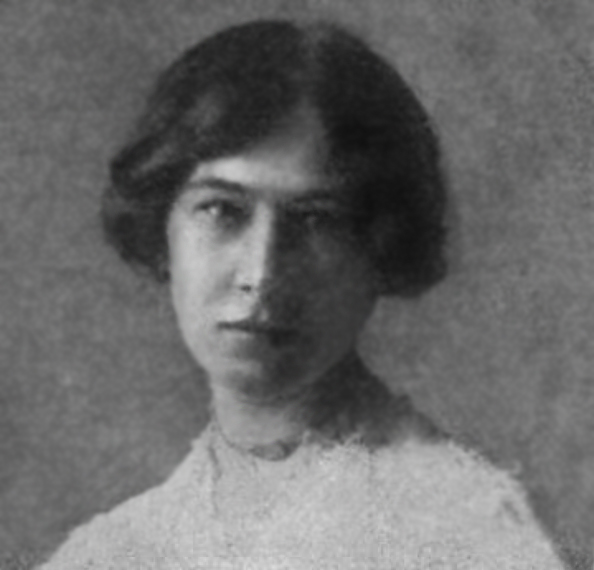
Ester Claesson in 1907

Ester Laura Matilda Claesson (7 June 1884 – 12 November 1931) was a Swedish landscaping pioneer and is considered the first female landscape architect in Sweden.

== Biography ==
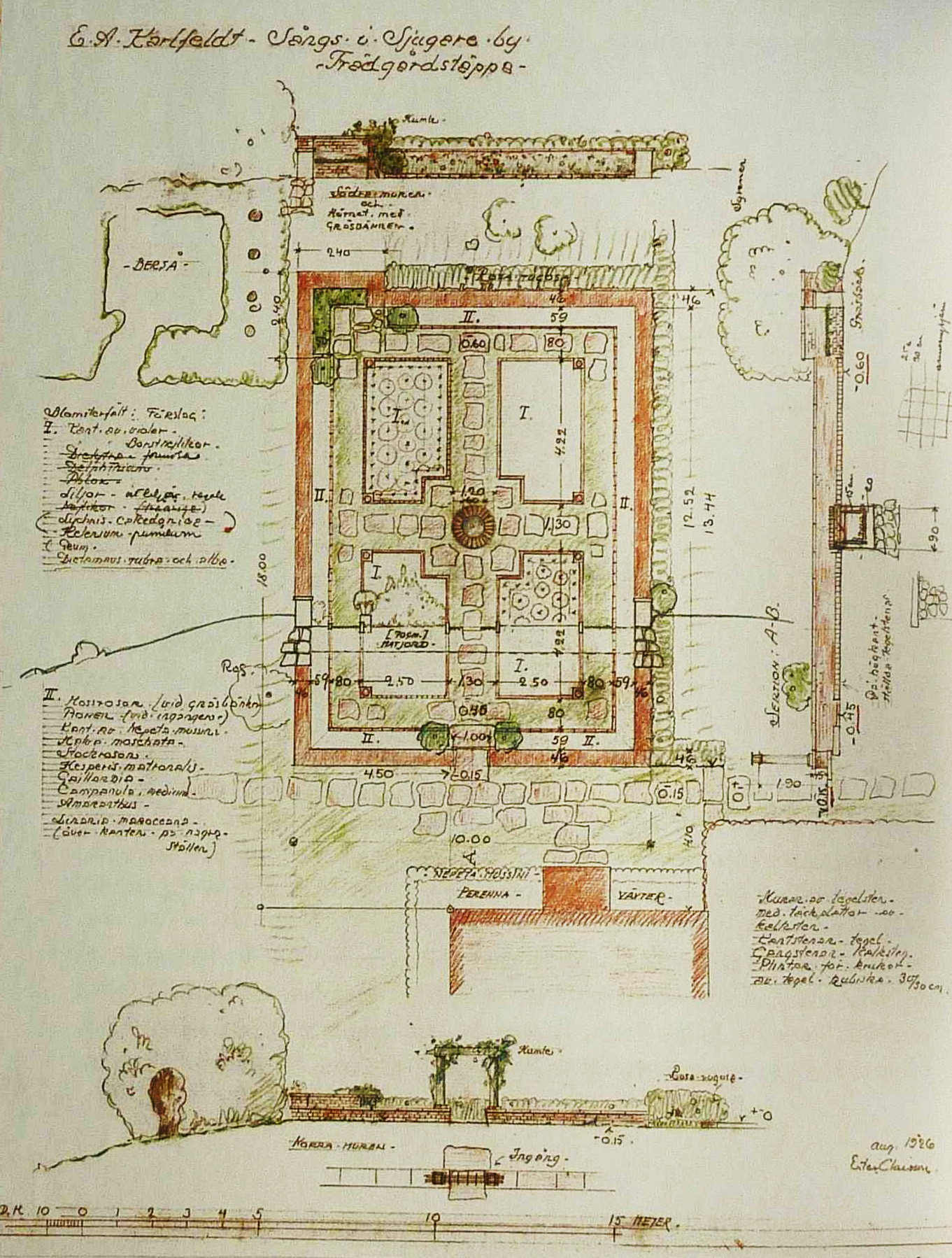
Drawing of the garden at Karlfeldtsgården Sångs, 1926

Claesson finished her secondary school in Stockholm in 1900, a time when there were no academically trained female landscape architects in Sweden. There were women gardening practitioners, but mainly those who already owned a garden of their own. Those who wanted a professional education had to go abroad, usually Denmark, England or Germany. As Claesson was interested in gardening and architecture, she worked as a gardener on a farm in Tomarp, Skåne. She later continued her education in Denmark, graduating in 1903 from Havebrugs Höjeskole in Charlottenlund.

After graduation, Claesson worked as a landscape architect for Paul Schultze-Naumburg in Germany, and for the architect Joseph Maria Olbrich in Darmstadt and Vienna in Austria. Claesson's most important work at Darmstadt was a terrace with a rose garden, from a mission made by Joseph Maria Olbrich's influential costumer Julius Glückert, who owned a furniture factory in the city.

In 1907, the women-oriented weekly magazine Idun declared Claesson Sweden's first female landscape architect, and her artistic work was further celebrated by the magazines Deutsche Kunst und Dekoration in 1907 and The Studio in 1912. In 1913, Claesson returned to Sweden and worked as an architect with Isak Gustaf Clason. She soon started her own business and introduced Olbrich's ideas to Sweden. She took her influences mainly from the English Arts and Crafts movement.

Her gardening was influenced by architectural elements. She gained note as a landscape architect and established a co-operation with landscape architects Carl Westman, Isak Gustaf Clason and Ivar Tengbom. During the first decade of the 1900s, she was the best-known and most-published landscape architect in Sweden.

In 1918, Claesson worked as a landscape architect at Villa Brevik in Lidingö, just north of Stockholm. Through her work there she made contact with Erik Axel Karlfeldt, who lived nearby and in 1921 Claesson designed the garden for Karlfeldtsgården (the Karlfeldt summer residence), north of Leksand, which still exists.

Claesson died at age 47, reportedly by a gunshot to the heart, and was buried on 22 November 1931 at Norra begravningsplatsen.

Illustrations of Ester Claesson's work

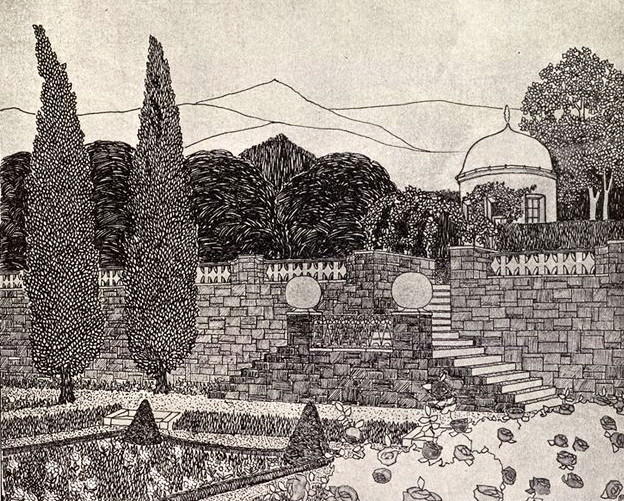
Terrasserad trädgård in The Studio, 1912

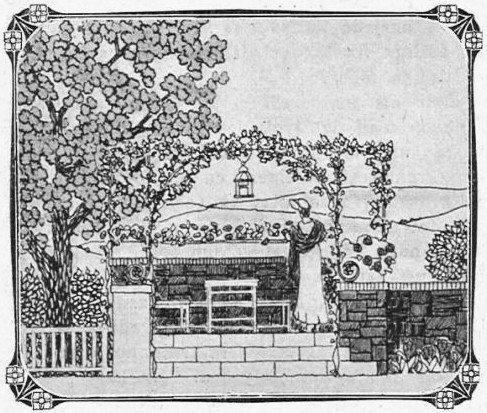
Garden wall with the terrace in Idun, 1907

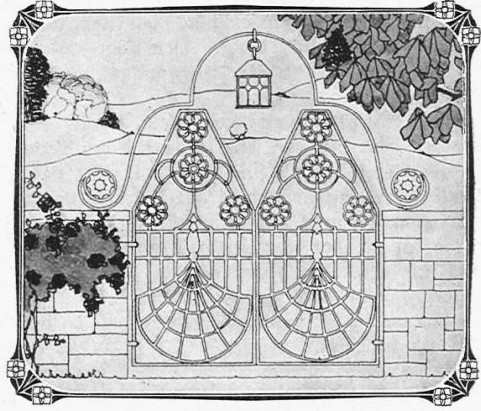
Garden gates in Idun, 1907

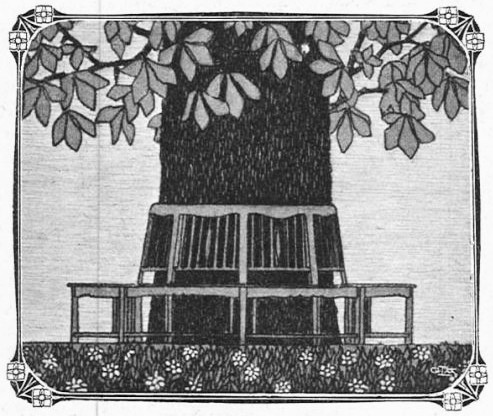
Garden bench in Idun, 1907

== Work ==
In 1914, Claesson and Harald Wadsjö participated in the gardening competition at Skogskyrkogården in Stockholm. Their joint exhibition Cumulus received the third prize. That a woman had received the third prize became noted in Germany.

Claesson's other noted works include her garden at Ingelsta gård in 1917, at Adelsnäs in 1916–20 and the Röda Bergen garden in the Humleboet in 1925. Claesson and Karlfeldt created a garden together at Karlfeldtsgården Sång with terraces looking on Lake Opplimen. This garden is Claesson's only landscape work that remains in its original state.

Karlfeldtsgården Sångs garden

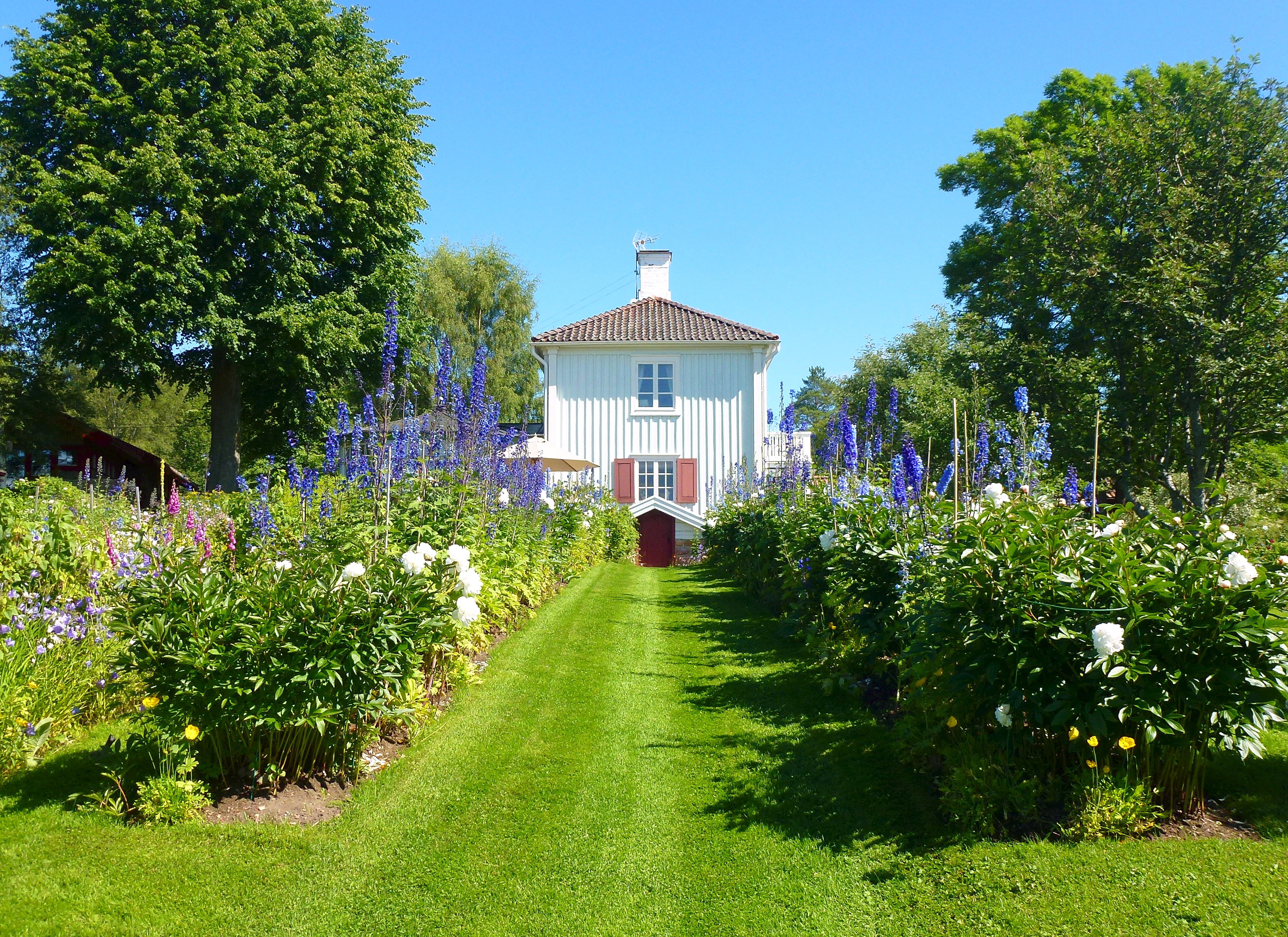

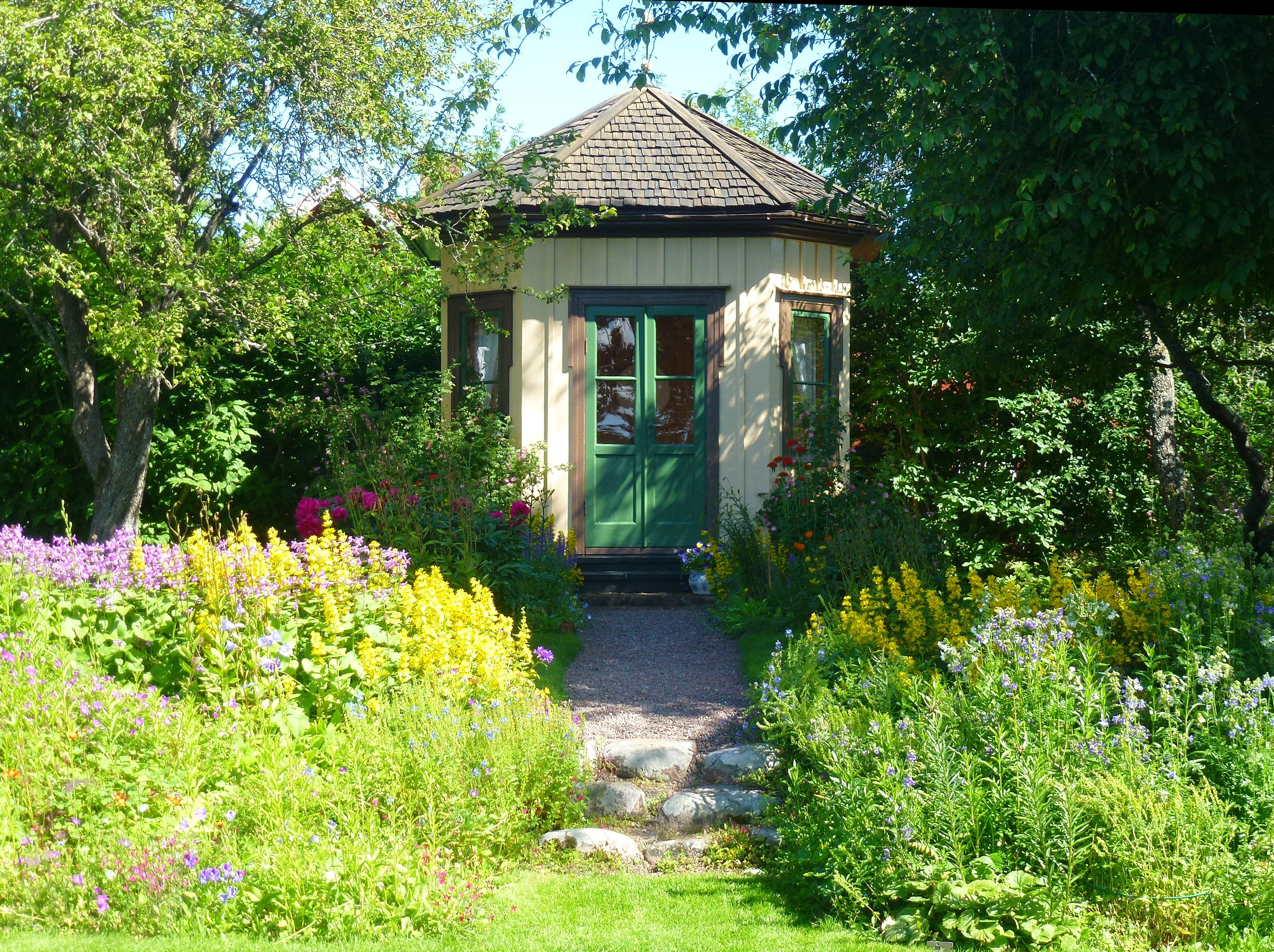

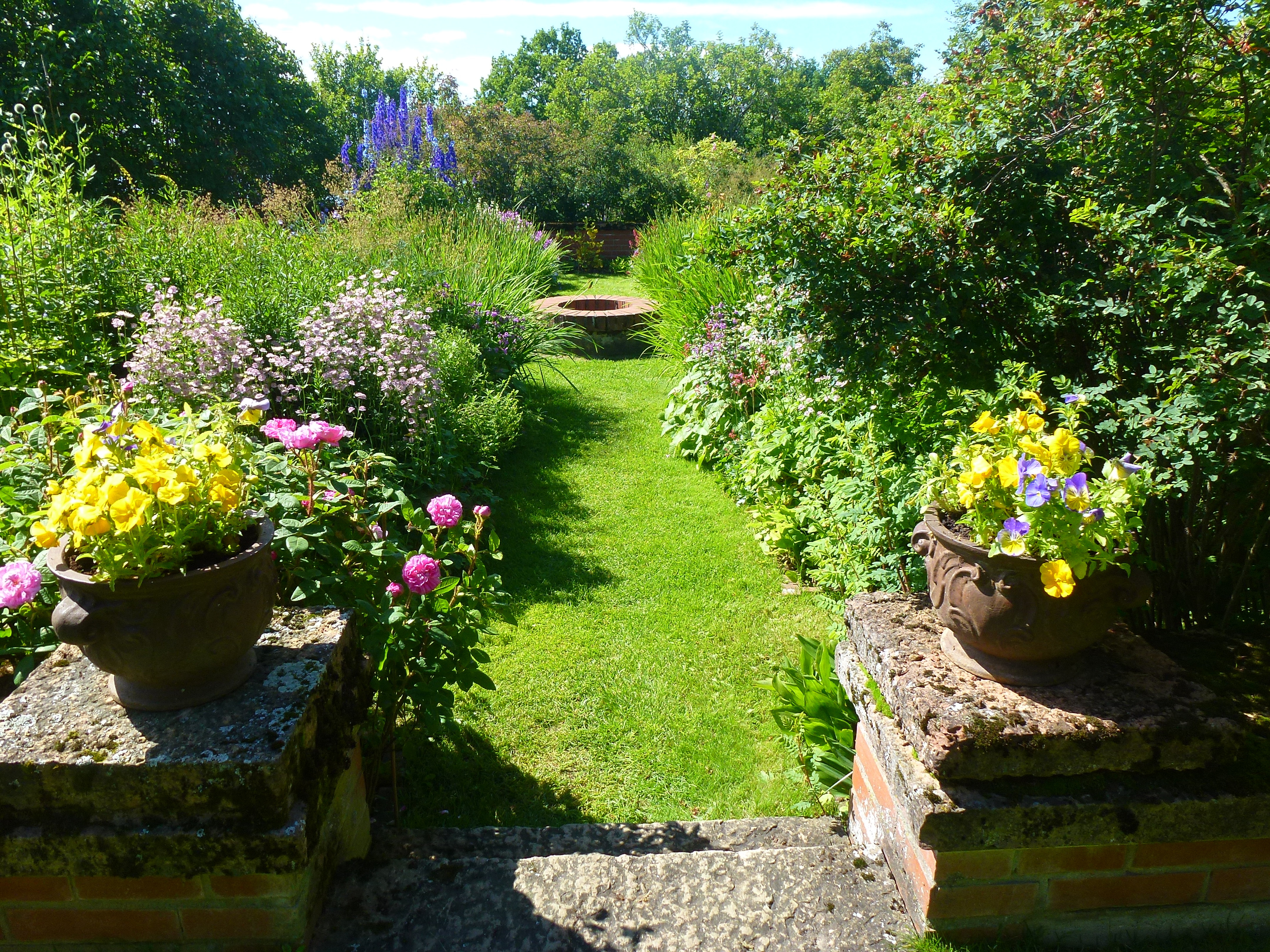

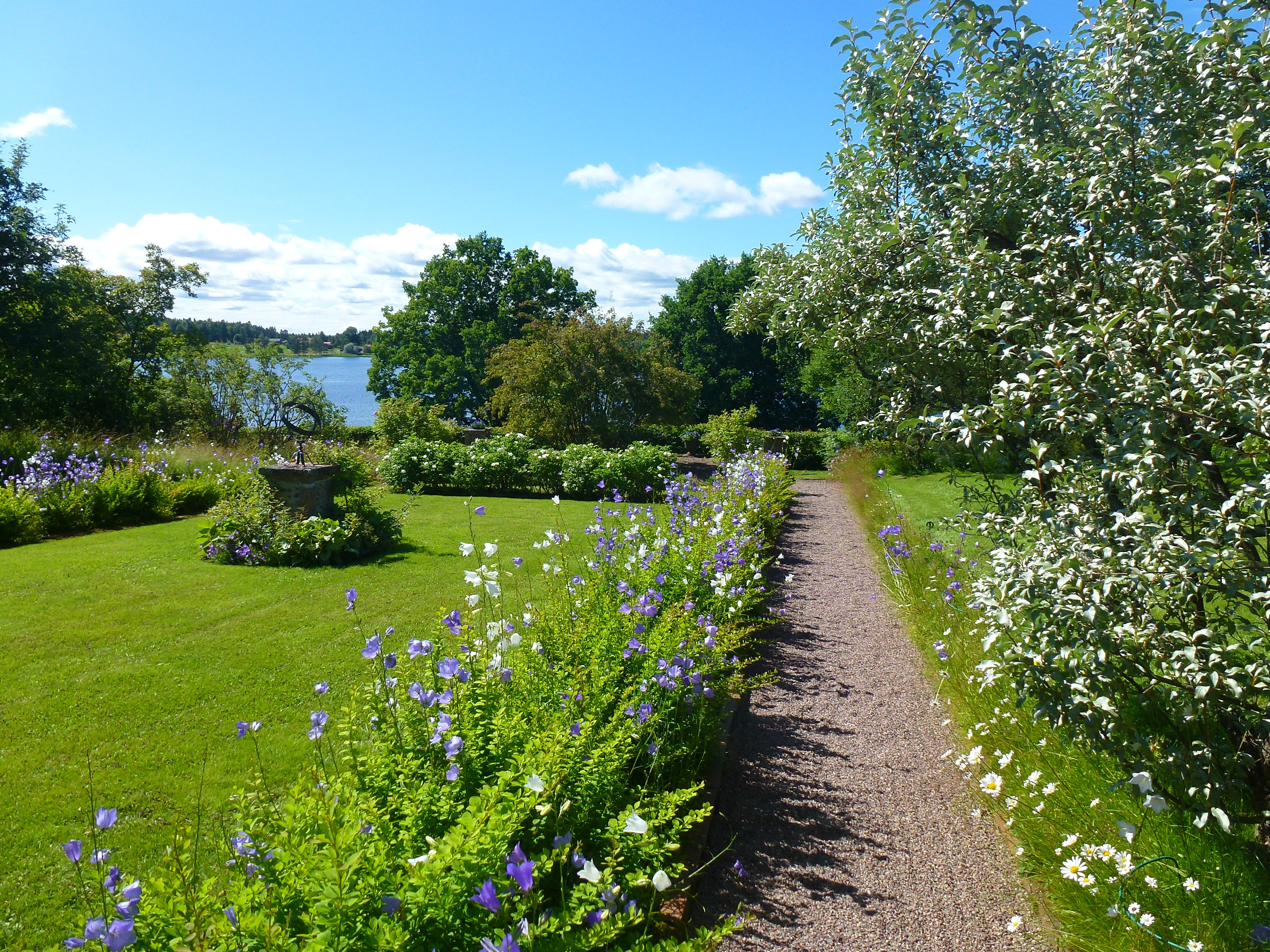
