= Nils Claesson =

Swedish artist and filmmaker

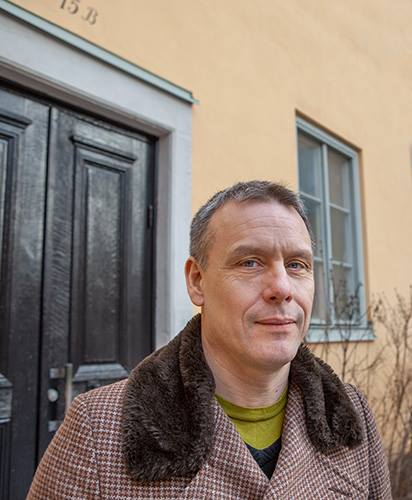
- Nils Claesson. Photo by Jann Lipka 2016
- Born: Nils Taki Claesson; 6 September 1958 (age 67); Stockholm, Sweden
- Occupations: Artist, filmmaker, author and artistic researcher
- Notable work: Blåbärsmaskinen (novel), Peering Intoo the Black Box,

Nils Taki Claesson (born 6 September 1958) is a Swedish artist, director, author and artistic researcher. He is currently assistant professor at the Stockholm University of the Arts.

== Biography ==
Claesson received his PhD in fine arts from the Film and Media Department at Stockholm University of the Arts with the dissertation The Ghost Machine: Seven changes and transitions – animation processes in animated film.

Claesson joined the newspaper ETC 1979–1984, where he was a co-owner for a while. He had acting roles in two films in the 1980s, among other things in Stig Larsson's film Ängel, but he has mainly directed, written manuscript and worked with animated films and radio documentaries. He has been working with digital media since the mid-1990s, and has played a central role in the development of Swedish digital art through his work for the artistic creative space for art and computing (CRAC), where he was chairman from 2002 to 2005. In connection with this, he established a broad international network, and organized international exhibitions such as "Money, a comment on the new economy", as well as seminars and exchange projects with other media labs in Europe. He also led the network for media labs in Norway, Pnek 2001–2002, and was one of the artists behind the Association for Temporary Art [a: t] a platform for art online (1997–2007). He has also been active in the artist-driven galleries Tegen2 and ID:I gallery. Claesson has exhibited extensively in Sweden and Europe.

The book The Blueberry Machine, published 2009, is about his father Stig Claesson.

== Selected works (2019–2025) ==
Claesson has produced a wide range of works in recent years, including films, books, and exhibitions, often exploring themes of memory, social change, and urban space.

- 2019: Valentina Dobrova's Life, a documentary project in collaboration with Denis Romanovski. Exhibited at TEGEN2 and Konstepidemin in Gothenburg.
- 2020:Texter som ingen läser ("Texts No One Reads") – a book published by Förlag Ruin. Read online
- Peering intoo the Black Box – six-channel video installation, solo exhibition at Galleri TEGEN2. DN review
- 2021: Group exhibition: Work, Life, and Love at the Royal Academy of Fine Arts in Stockholm. Work: Black Painting – White Painting. Curated by Sara Arrhenius.
- 2022: Co-editor of the book After Work, on artistic research and the meaning of labor. Source
- 2023: Art Takes a Time Out – Five Seconds for Justice, at TEGEN2
- Five Buckets of Potatoes, shown at Supermarket Art Fair
- 2024:
- An Island – video installation exhibited in Nutopia in Stockholm. DN review
- Ro en ko ("Row a Cow") – short film in the exhibition Islands at Galleri Verkligheten, Umeå. Exhibition VK review
- 2025: An Artist Must Not Be Too Molded – film premiere at Konsthändelse 2025 in Stockholm.

== Curatorial work ==
Claesson has curated several exhibitions at **Galleri TEGEN2** in Stockholm and developed the visual arts program at **ETC Solar Park** in Katrineholm, including four summer exhibitions and a student project.

ETC Solar Park (Katrineholm)

- 2021: The Borderless Wild Boar (Carl Johan Erikson and Karin Willén)
- 2022: Move Mountains (Lars Bergström, Mats Bigert, Hannah Ljung, Tina Nyqvist)
- 2023: First There Was Darkness (Takao Momiyama, Gunnel Pettersson, Nisse Bergman)
- 2025: Blue Blood (Alexander Mood)
- Student exhibition: Awesome Ararat Source

Galleri TEGEN2 (Stockholm)

- 2022: Animate or Die (Assar Tallinger, Sarah Gampel, Emma Hjelm)
- 2023: Red Lines (Elin Wikström and Denis Romanovski) – Source

== Academic publications ==
A selection of Claesson's academic publications are available in the DiVA research portal:

- Texter som ingen läser (2020) – Full text
- After Work (2022), ed. Nils Claesson, Karin Hansson, Georg Kentros – Source
- See full list: https://www.uniarts.se/english/people/phd-students/nils-claesson

== Radio and film ==
Directing

- 2016 Love and solidarity
- 2012 sliN
- 2006 Snow – from the white you remember
- 1998 The little horror movie package
- 1995 Chameleon
- 1995 People's movies
- 1995 The world's longest Christmas Eve
- 1994 Three minutes each summer
- 1993 Moon face
- 1986 Man who shaves at Seine
- 1984 The one looking away is a rat

Manuscripts

- 2006 Snow – from the white you remember
- 1995 Chameleon
- 1993 Moon face

Roles

- 1989 Angel
- 1987 The Awakening

== Books, book chapters and articles ==
- 2017 Seven changes and transitions – artistic processeses in animated movies
- 2016 We are not yet seeing the results of artistic research
- 2014 When photographs were pictures, not art
- 2013 The lab: 12 voices about laboratories and libraries
- 2012 sliN, Performing the Common
- 2012 The road to Husby
- 2012 Introduction to the animated moving image
- 2009 The blueberry machine
- 2002 Money
- 1998 The family and everything about the meaning of life
- 1985 I and Angela Davis

== Art projects ==
- 2018 You have no choice
- 2018 Books no one reads
- 2015 Lost and found in translation
- 2016 A train to Spain
- 2013 The Shadow machine
- 2012 sliN, Performing the common
- 2009 The Contract
- 2007 Body in the net
- 2007 SWIZHE
- 2006 Video-Dnevnik
- 2006 Re-approaching new media, Ram 7
- 2005 Re:production
- 2005 40 years of victory
- 2004 Solidarity without heroes
- 2002 The Pudas Box
- 2002 Money, an exhibition about the new economy
- 2001 The Public Opinion
- 2000 The Art of organising
- 2000 The Minsk connection
- 2000 Speak to Ingmar
- 1998 "Say Voff"
- 1998 Time Viewers
- 1998 Travel to countries that are no longer available
- 1998 Opens in a thousand years – a message to the future from Vallhornsgatan in Rågsved, Port
- 1997 Movies of the memory (Minnets filmer)
