= John Willard Clawson =

American painter

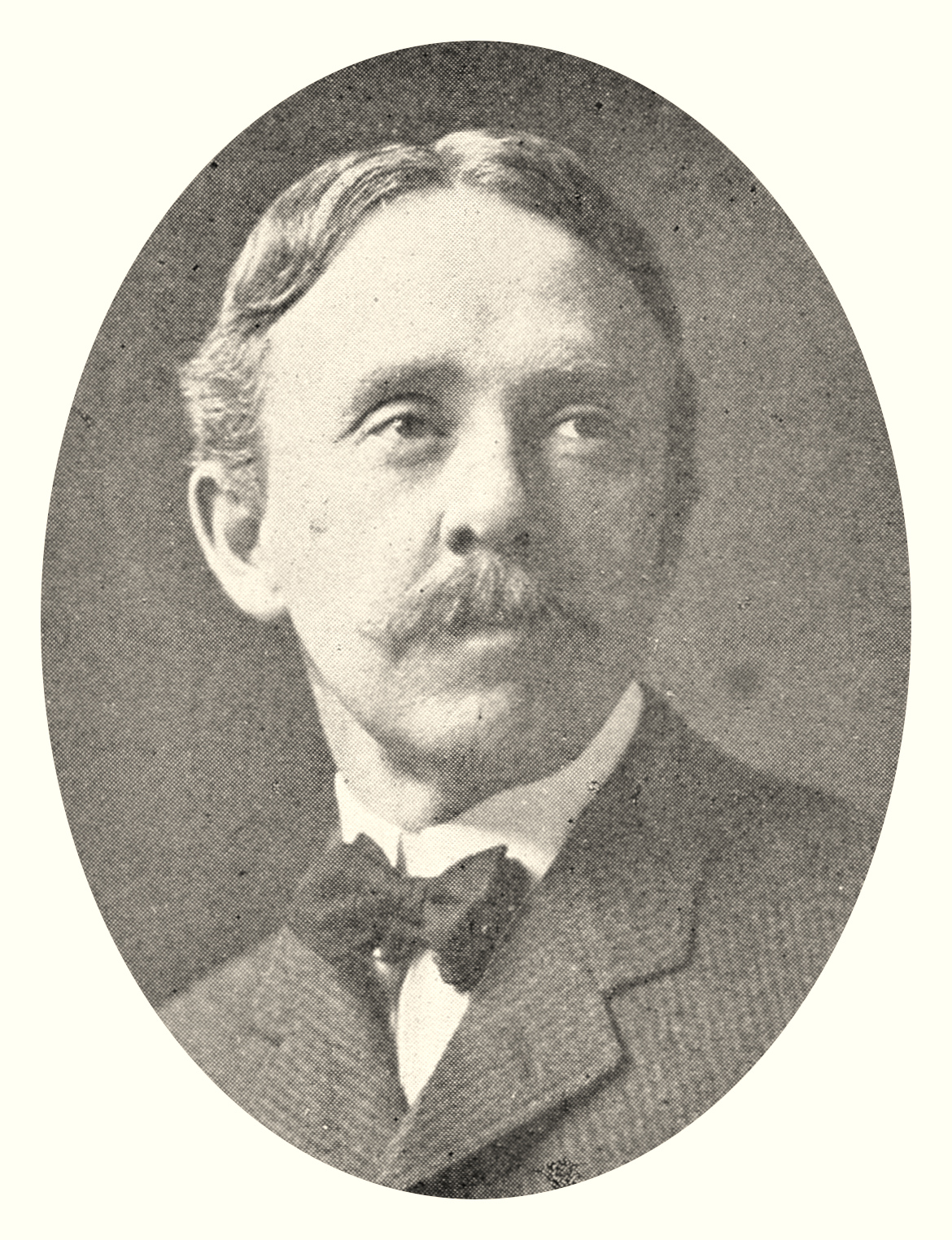
- Born: January 18, 1858; Salt Lake City, Utah
- Died: April 6, 1936 (age 78); Utah, U.S.
- Resting place: Salt Lake City Cemetery
- Education: University of Deseret, National Academy of Design, Académie Julian, École des Beaux-Arts
- Known for: artist, painter
- Spouse: Mary Clarke

John Willard "Will" Clawson (January 18, 1858 – April 6, 1936) was an American, Utah-based artist, in the late-19th and early 20th-century.

== Biography ==
Clawson was born to Hiram B. Clawson and his wife, the former Alice Young. Alice was a daughter of Brigham Young, and Clawson was born in the blue room of the Beehive House, which was built by Brigham Young for his wives and their families.

Clawson studied at the University of Deseret, among his notable teachers there was George M. Ottinger. He married Mary Clark in the LDS Church Endowment House shortly before his departure for New York City to study at the National Academy of Design. He then returned to Salt Lake City where he was primarily involved in portrait painting although he preferred doing landscapes. In 1891 Clawson went to Paris where he studied at the Académie Julian and then the École des Beaux-Arts. While at the later institution he received instruction from Claude Monet and Édouard Manet. He also spent nine months in Vienne studying under Julius Stewart. Before returning to the United States he also traveled to Britain where he did portraits of several members of parliament.

He returned to Utah in 1896 where he established a studio and served as the first secretary of the Society of Utah Artists. However he later moved to San Francisco. His studio and $80,000 worth of art were destroyed in the 1906 earthquake, after which he relocated his practice to Los Angeles. From 1909 to 1919 Clawson practiced art in New York City and then in the later year he returned to Los Angeles. In Los Angeles Clawson mainly painted portraits of movie and theatre stars, the later often coming from New York City.

In 1933 Clawson retired to Utah. He was able to then focus on landscape painting, and portraits of Latter-day Saint leaders, including a portrait of Joseph Smith, Jr. he worked on the day of his death.

== Collections ==
The Art Department of Brigham Young University holds a large collection of his works, totalling 155. The Utah Museum of Fine Arts also holds some of his works.

== Publications ==
- Clawson, John Willard (1938), The John Willard Clawson Collection: paintings, sketches & drawings, Provo, Utah: Brigham Young University, ISBN 9781586851118, OCLC 18915035
