= Augusta Clawson =

American civil servant

Augusta Holmes Clawson (June 23, 1903 – May 13, 1997) was an American civil servant, and writer of Shipyard Diary of a Woman Welder, a diary about welding in World War II.

Clawson was a graduate of Vassar. Later, she earned a master's degree in personnel administration at New York University. In 1943, she was assigned by the United States Office of Education to work undercover as a welder at the Swan Island Shipyard in order to discover the difficulties faced by women workers and the reasons many women welders were leaving the job shortly after completing training. Her book based on her experiences there, Shipyard Diary of a Woman Welder, was published in 1944 by Penguin Books. She retired from government service in 1973.

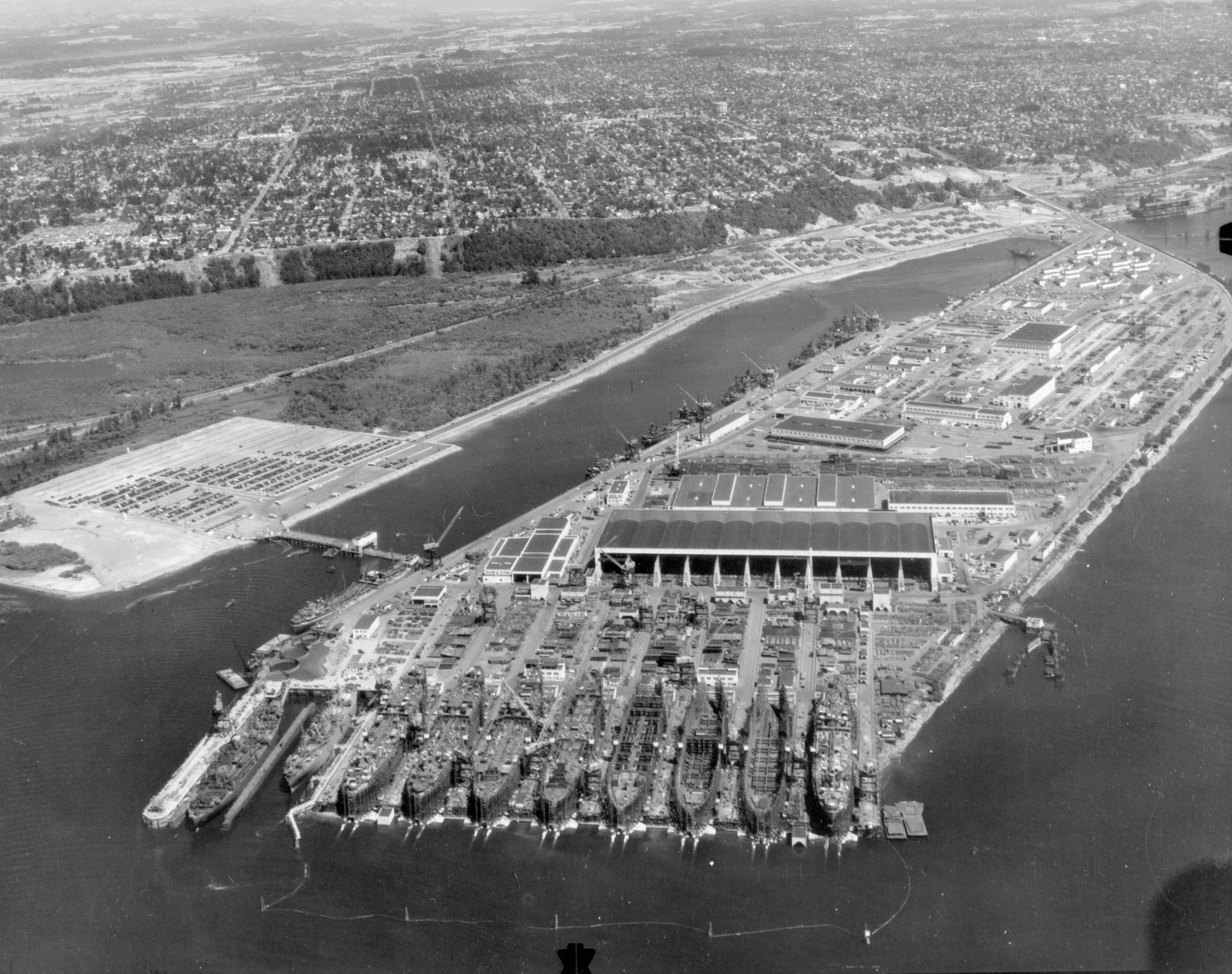
The Swan Island Shipyard where Clawson conducted her research.

Clawson gave a collection of items from her time as a welder, including her welding helmet, to the Smithsonian Institution. The research she conducted on the shipyards was used to improve training, create regulations, and uphold women being included in trades.

== Backstory ==
After graduating from Vassar, Clawson attended New York University where she earned a master's degree in personnel administration. Before turning to civil service, Clawson was the director of placement and apprenticeship at Edison Vocational and Technical High School. A couple years before the war had even started, vocational schools, including Clawson's, had to start training their students for war production. Clawson recounts how all of her students were men until after Pearl Harbour. Women were taking their places as the armed forces had begun drafting men for War. Clawson recognized how most of the women were beginning to take on jobs that they had never done before. Further into the War, the U.S. Department of Education had taken notice of the frequency that women were quitting their jobs on shipyards. Clawson was then hired to work and spy on the Swan Island Shipyard. Her Diary recounts her experiences as a female welder during World War 2.

== Life as a Shipyard Welder ==
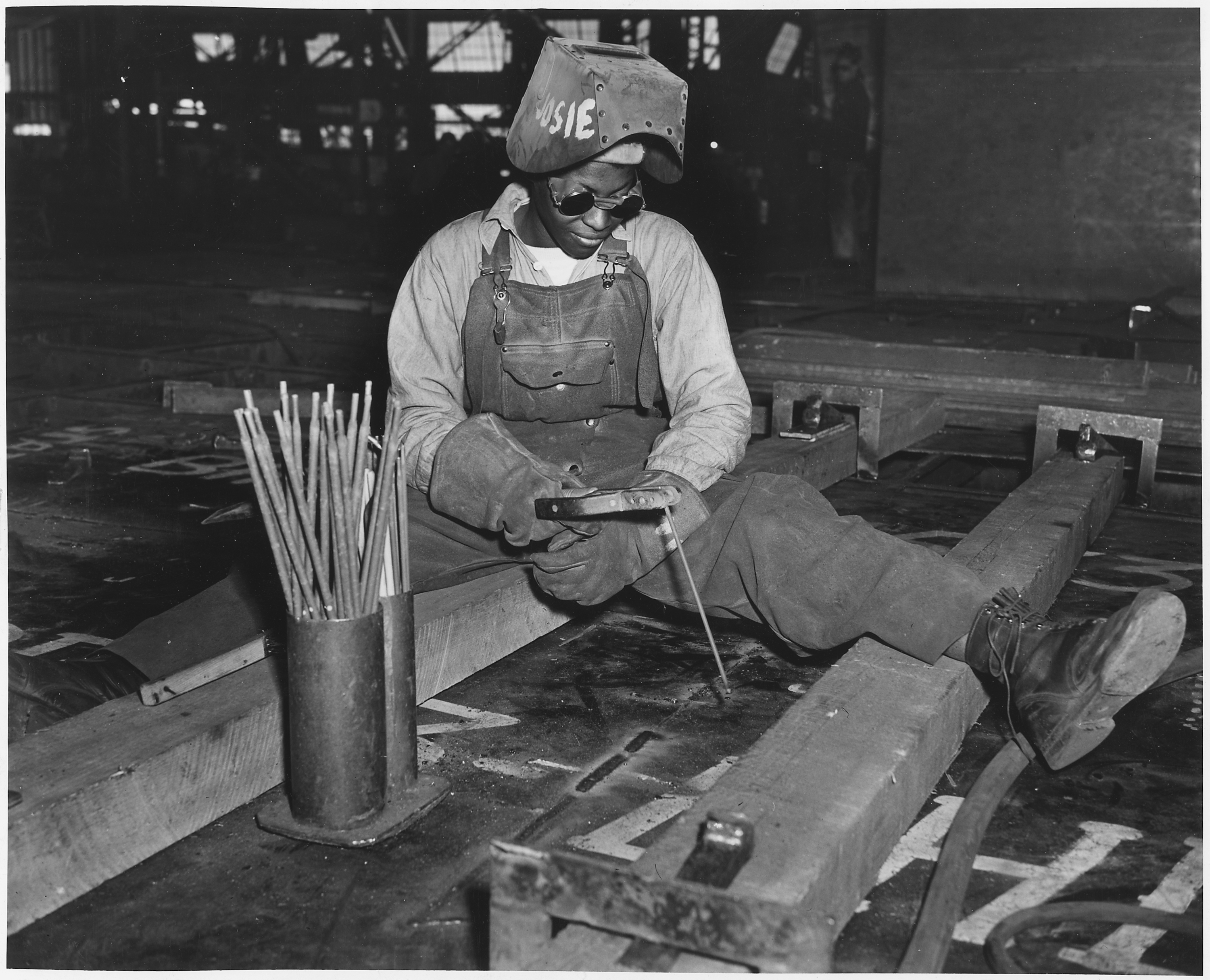
A welder working on the Kaiser Shipyard in Richmond, California.

Clawson's Diary was published at the start of the last year of the War, which was a very crucial and hectic time for many Americans. Clawson urges women reading to enter war industries; she writes "You have a job to do. The satisfaction you will gain from it is unequalled." Throughout her book, she advocates for women to join the trades, not just for the war effort, but for themselves. She wants them to experience the fulfillment of being a part of a team and being able to prove that "Industrial Women" (what they were called during the War) could thrive in traditionally male-dominated careers.

Clawson notes that even though women were the driving force at the home front, they were still treated with the typical misogyny they had faced before the War began. Before even arriving at the Kaiser Company's shipyard (Swan Island Shipyard), Clawson recounts the drive there. How "the driver was a woman, and the men ragged her about the risk they were taking by riding with her." Furthermore, she challenged the stereotypical judgement that came when women were rightfully emotional. She describes how a welder on the Shipyard had just been notified that her son was going to be drafted. "She had to take her test and was as jittery as could be. I wonder if this is the sort of thing that people glibly call 'the emotional instability of women' without investigating first to find its cause! A woman has the right to be at less than her calmest."

She includes a detailed analysis on how workplace safety regulations were improper and could possibly endanger the lives of workers. This included proper harnesses and guard rails. She notes how she did not complain about the unsafe conditions because she did not want to allow men to say that "women couldn't take it", even though "men will continue to say so."

She concludes her book encouraging women to take up employment in one of the many needed jobs at the time, although her words still apply today: "Women are needed in aircraft plants, in munition works, and in shipyards."

== Impact ==
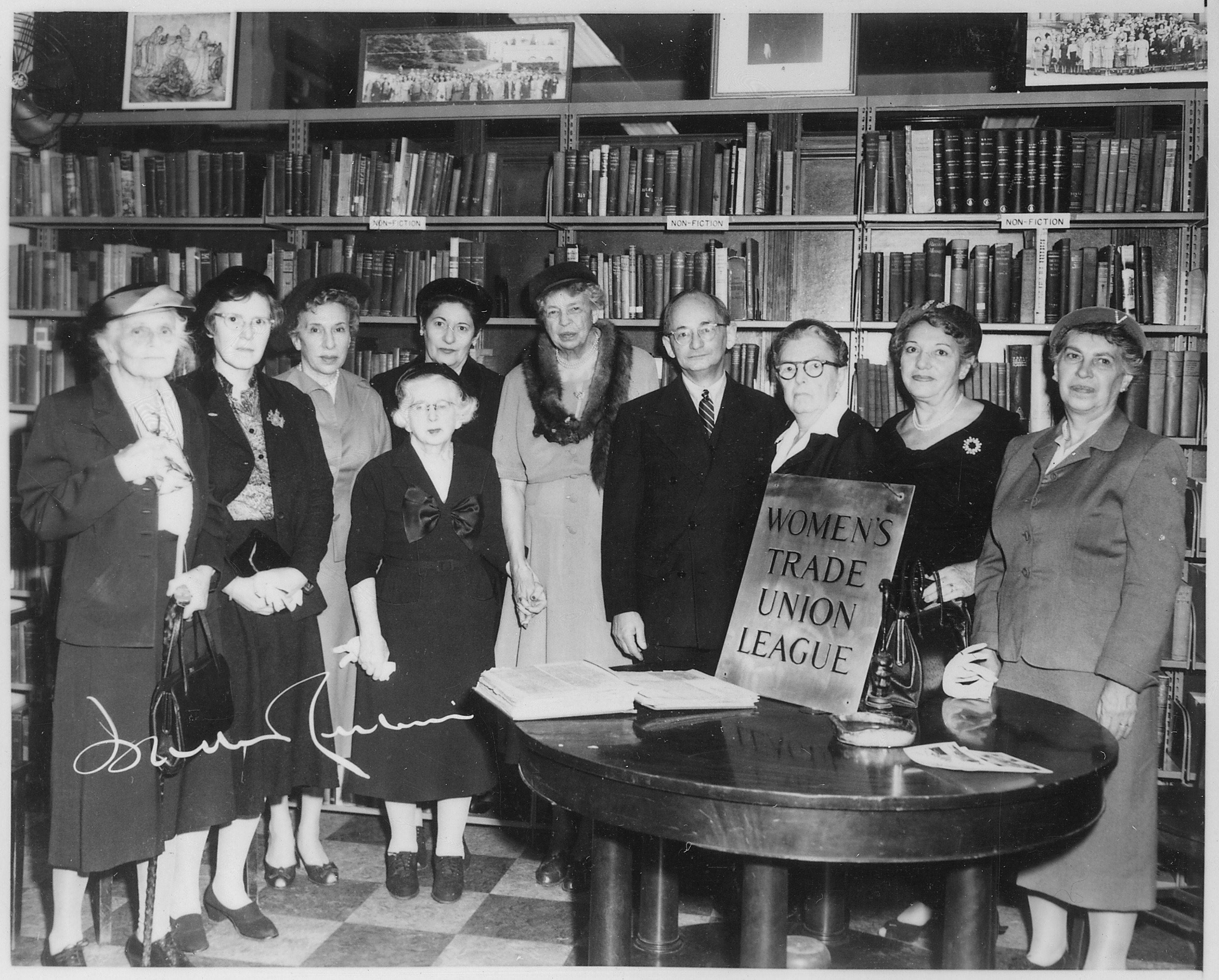
The Women's Trade Union League

Clawson was on the Swan Island Shipyard for about two months. She returned to the Department of Education and began making changes in wartime training facilities. She used her experience at the Shipyard to craft the curriculum, so it better resembled the work environment that welders would be working in. In 1950, the Hannah Harrison School in Washington was opened with Clawson's authority. It specialized in career training for "worthy women dependent upon their own efforts for their livelihood." It offered free vocational training with safe working conditions and superior educational resources.
