= Carol Anne Clayson =

American oceanographer

Carol Anne Clayson is an American physical oceanographer. Her research studies the processes connecting the ocean to the atmosphere through both high-resolution remote sensing and computer models, including the transport of heat, fresh water, and water vapor through the ocean and atmosphere, and the effects of these processes on climate and weather. She is a part time senior scientist at the Woods Hole Oceanographic Institution.

== Education and career ==
Clayson majored in physics and astronomy at Brigham Young University, graduating in 1988. She continued her studies in aerospace engineering science at the University of Colorado, where she received a master's degree in 1990 and completed her Ph.D. in the Program in Atmospheric and Oceanic Sciences in 1995.

She became an assistant professor in the Department of Earth and Atmospheric Sciences at Purdue University in 1995, and was tenured as an associate professor in 2001. In 2002, she moved to the Department of Meteorology at Florida State University, where she became director of the Geophysical Fluid Dynamics Institute.

She took her present position at the Woods Hole Oceanographic Institution in 2011. She was promoted to senior scientist in 2014, and became director of the Center for Air-Sea Interaction and Marine Atmospheric Sciences in 2018.

== Books ==
Clayson is the author of:

- Numerical Models of Oceans and Oceanic Processes (2000)
- Small Scale Processes in Geophysical Fluid Flows (2000)

== Recognition ==
Clayson received a National Science Foundation CAREER Award in 1996, an Office of Naval Research Young Investigator Award in 2000, and the Presidential Early Career Award for Scientists and Engineers in 2000. She was the 2021 Jet Propulsion Laboratory Distinguished Climate Lecturer.
