= Joseph Maria Olbrich =

Austrian architect and one of the Vienna Secession founders

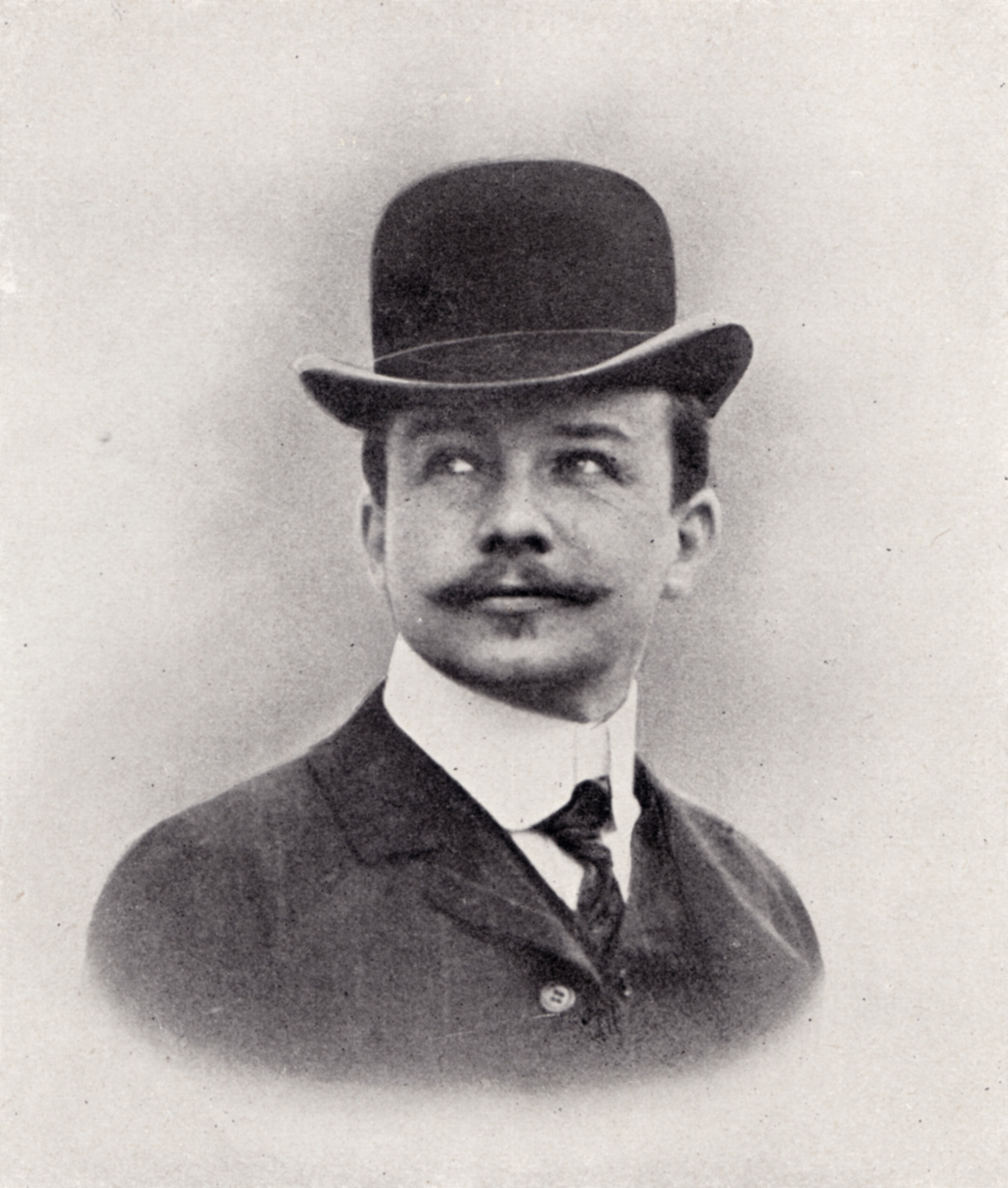
- Born: 22 December 1867; Troppau, Austria-Hungary
- Died: 8 August 1908 (aged 40); Düsseldorf, German Empire
- Occupation: Architect
- Awards: Prix de Rome (1893)
- Buildings: Secession hall

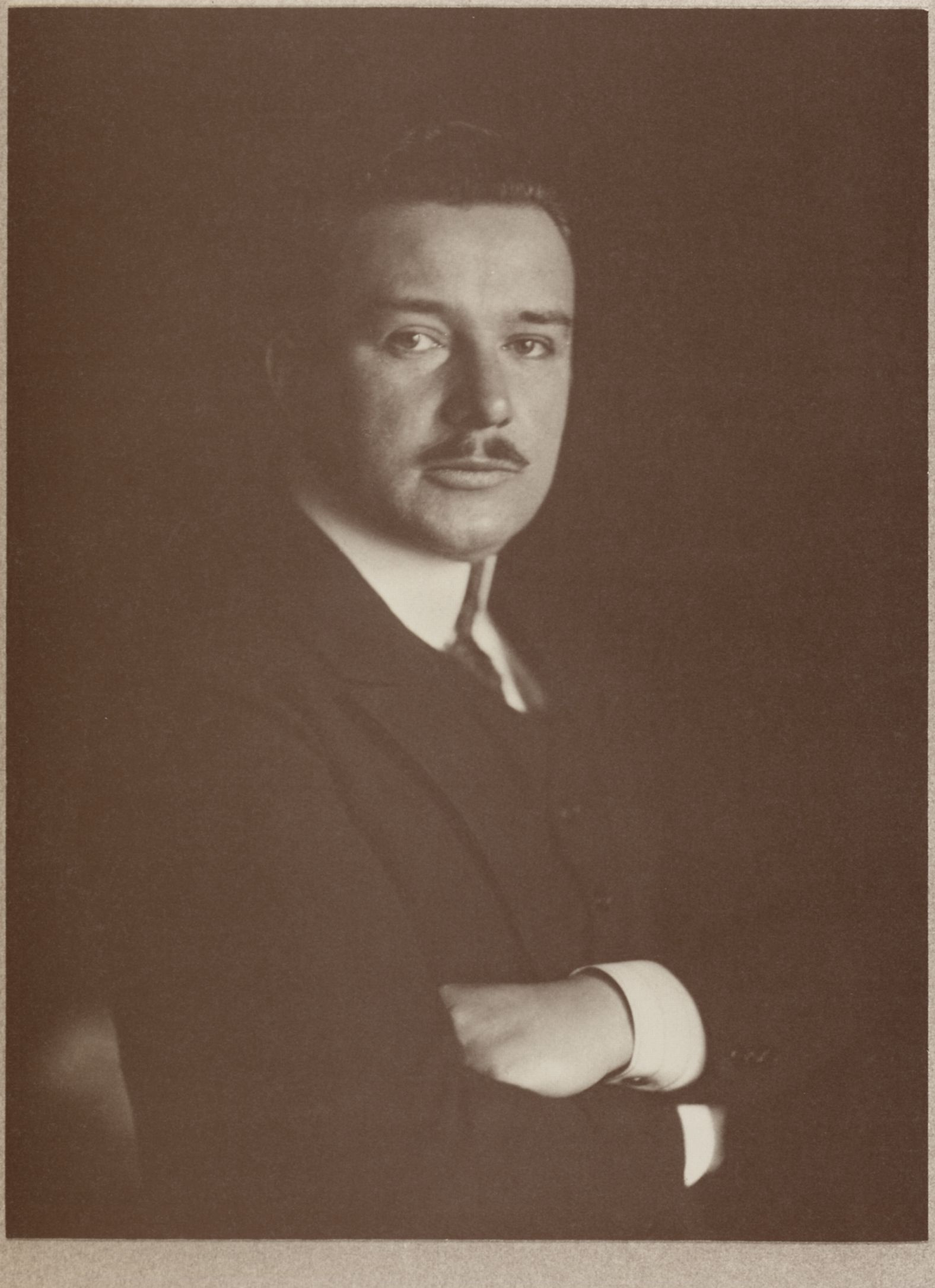
Joseph Maria Olbrich around 1908.

Joseph Maria Olbrich (22 December 1867 – 8 August 1908) was an Austrian architect and one of the Vienna Secession founders.

== Early life ==
Olbrich was born in Troppau, Austrian Silesia (modern day Opava, Czech Republic), the third child of Edmund and Aloisia Olbrich. He had two sisters, who died before he was born, and two younger brothers, John and Edmund. His father was a prosperous confectioner and wax manufacturer who also owned a brick works, where Olbrich's interest in the construction industry has its early origin.

== Career ==
Olbrich studied architecture at the University of Applied Arts Vienna (Wiener Staatsgewerbeschule) and the Academy of Fine Arts Vienna, where he won several prizes. These included the Prix de Rome, for which he traveled to Italy and North Africa. In 1893, he started working for Otto Wagner, the Austrian architect, where he worked on Wagner's Wiener Stadtbahn (Metropolitan Railway) buildings.

In 1897, Gustav Klimt, Olbrich, Josef Hoffmann and Koloman Moser founded the Vienna Secession artistic group. The group's aesthetic sense sought playful juxtapositions of blank surfaces and geometric regularity against expansive (largely floral) ornamentation. Olbrich designed their exhibition building, the famous Secession Building, which became the movement's landmark. The building combined a church-like entrance hall with a warehouse-like exhibition space.

In 1899, Ernest Louis, Grand Duke of Hesse, founded the Darmstadt Artists' Colony, for which Olbrich designed many house and several exhibition buildings. Olbrich gained Hessian citizenship in 1900 and was appointed to a professorship by the Grand Duke. In 1903, he married Claire Morawe.

In the following years, Olbrich executed diverse architectural commissions and experimented in applied arts and design. He designed pottery, furniture, book bindings, and musical instruments. His courtyard and interiors at the St. Louis World's Fair won the highest prize at the exhibition. At the time, the St. Louis Post-Dispatch wrote of his pavilion, "The interior decorators of the United States are now talking about the Olbrich Pavilion. It is already indicated as one of the things at the World's Fair which will leave a permanent mark upon American life." He was subsequently appointed corresponding member of the American Institute of Architects. His architectural works, especially his exhibition buildings for the Vienna and Darmstadt Secessions, had a strong influence on the development of the Art Nouveau style.

Shortly after his daughter Marianne's birth on 19 July 1908, Olbrich died from leukemia in Düsseldorf on 8 August, aged 40.

== Works ==
- The Secession hall, Vienna
- Residence for Hermann Bahr, Vienna
- Hochzeitsturm and other buildings at Darmstadt Artists' Colony, Mathildenhöhe, Darmstadt
- Department store for Leonhard Tietz, Düsseldorf
- Villa for Josef Feinhals, Cologne, built 1908 and destroyed in World War II

== Gallery ==
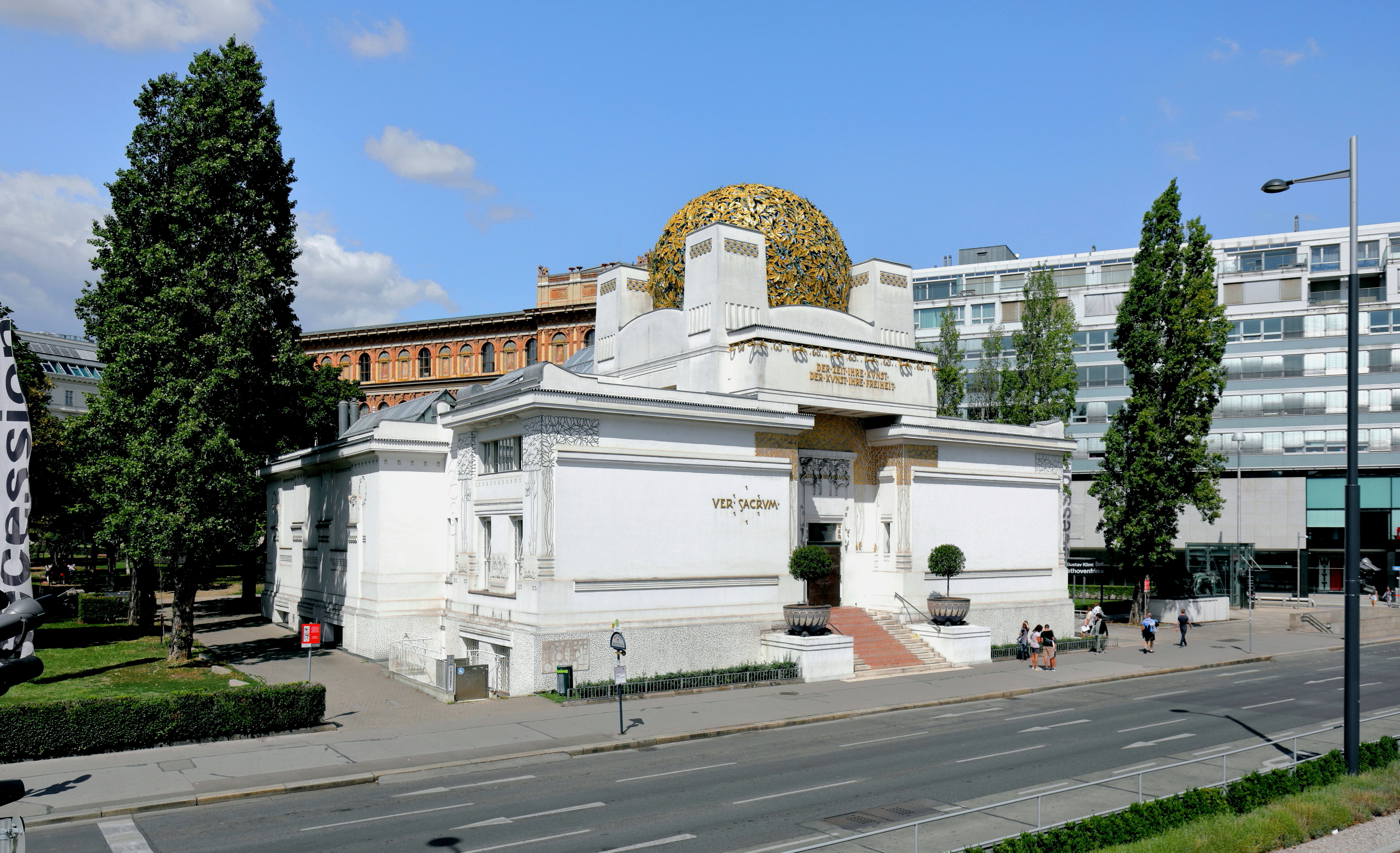
Secession Hall, Vienna

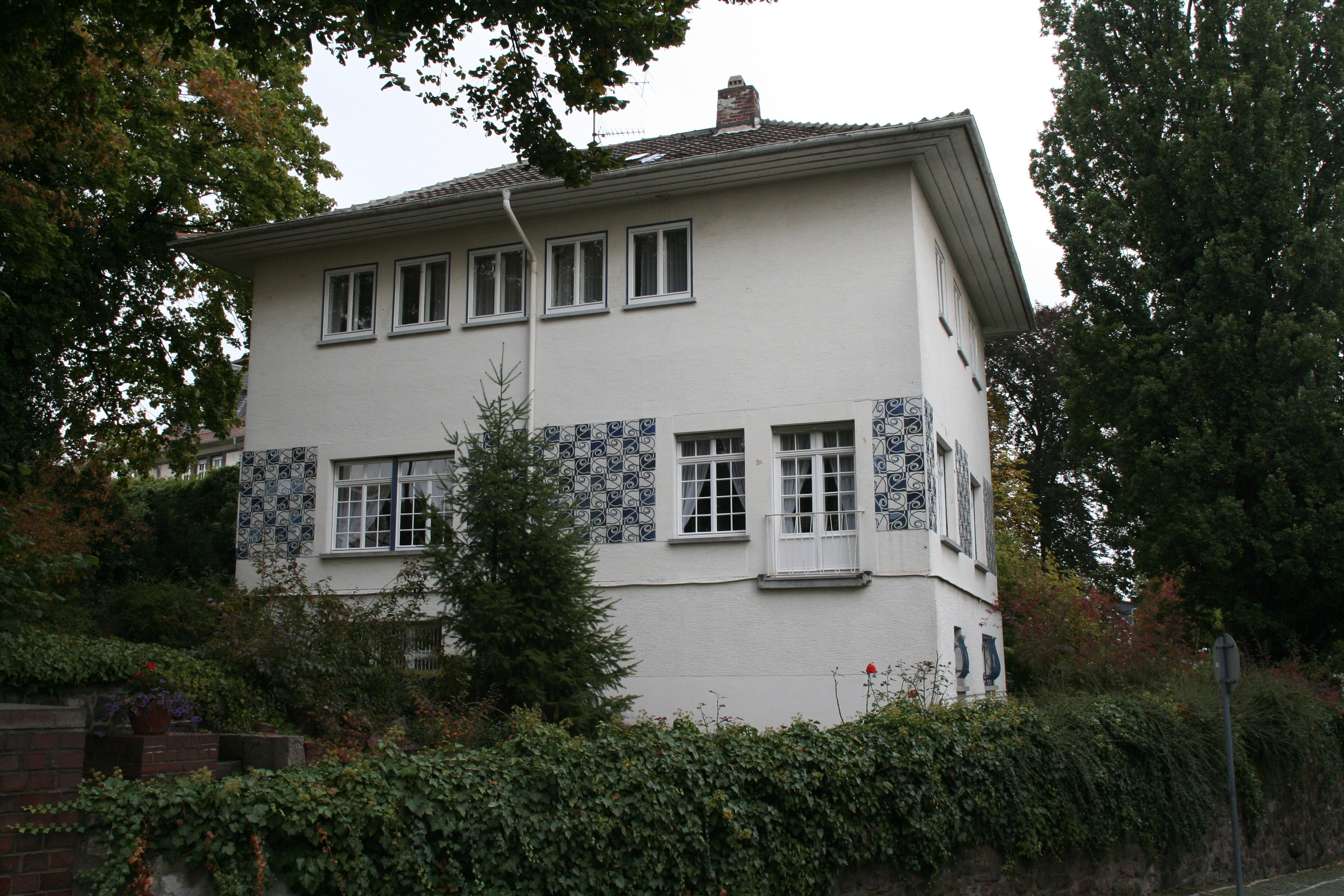
Olbrich's house at the Darmstadt Artists' Colony

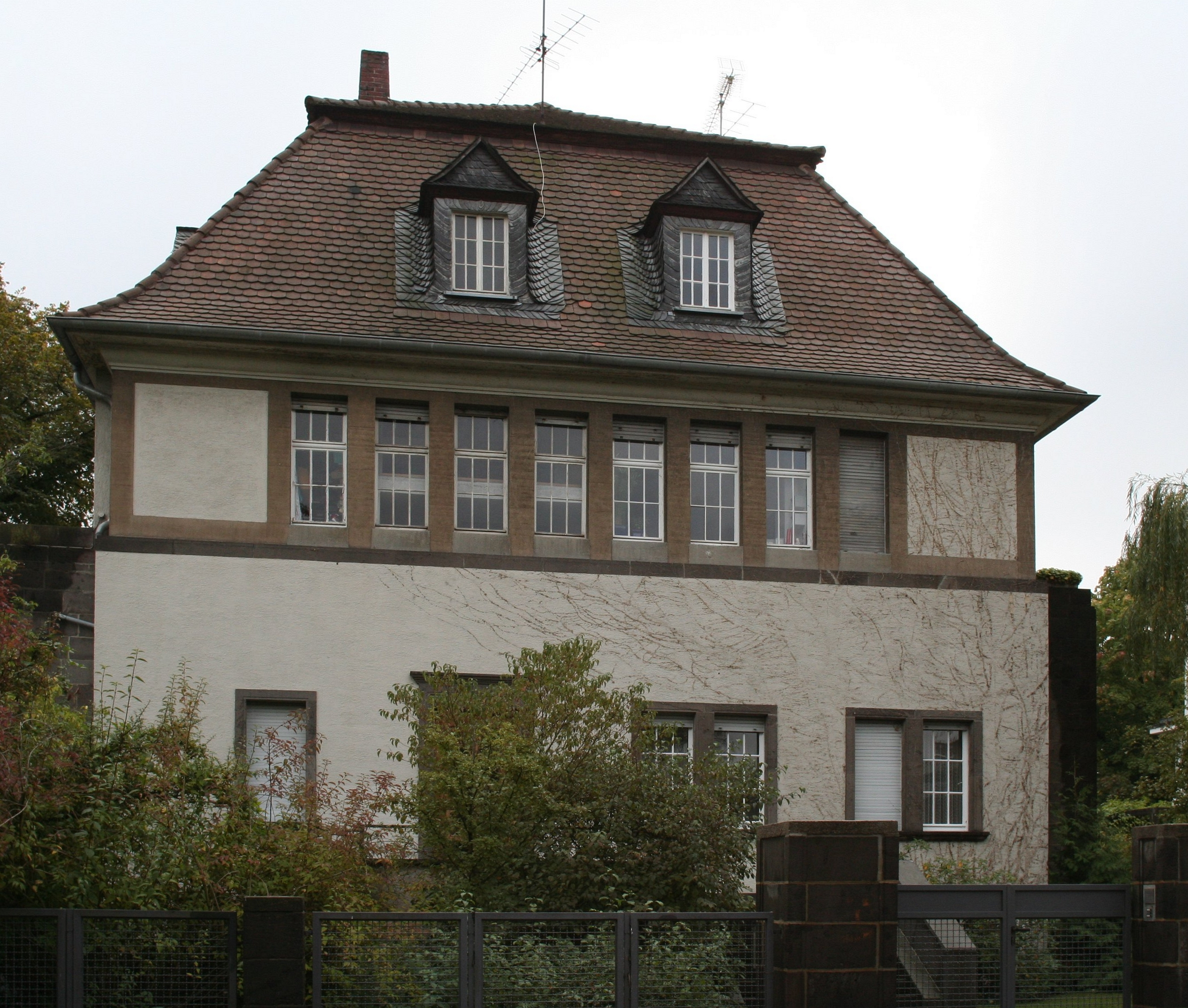
Upper Hesse Exhibition House, Darmstadt Artists' Colony

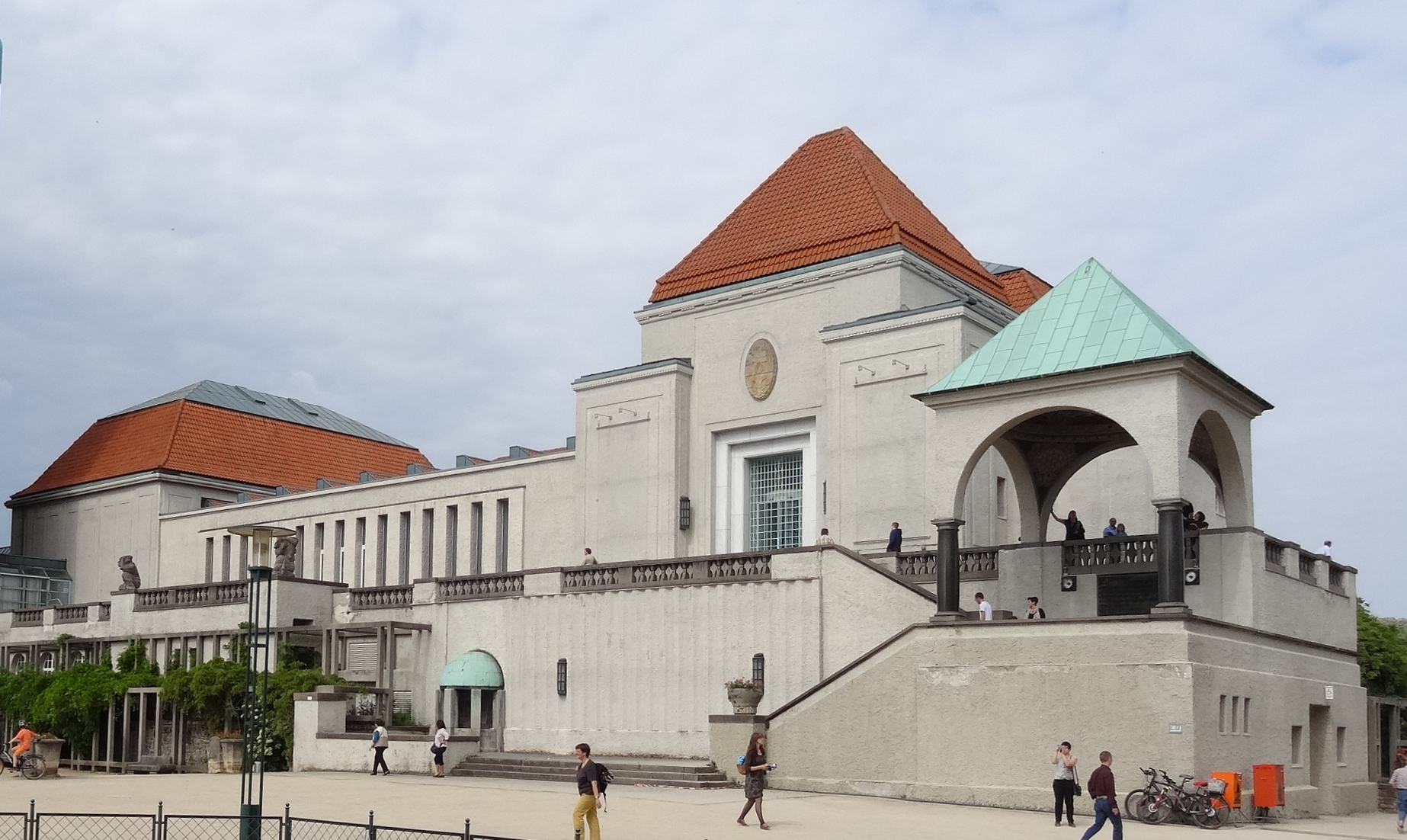
Exhibition building

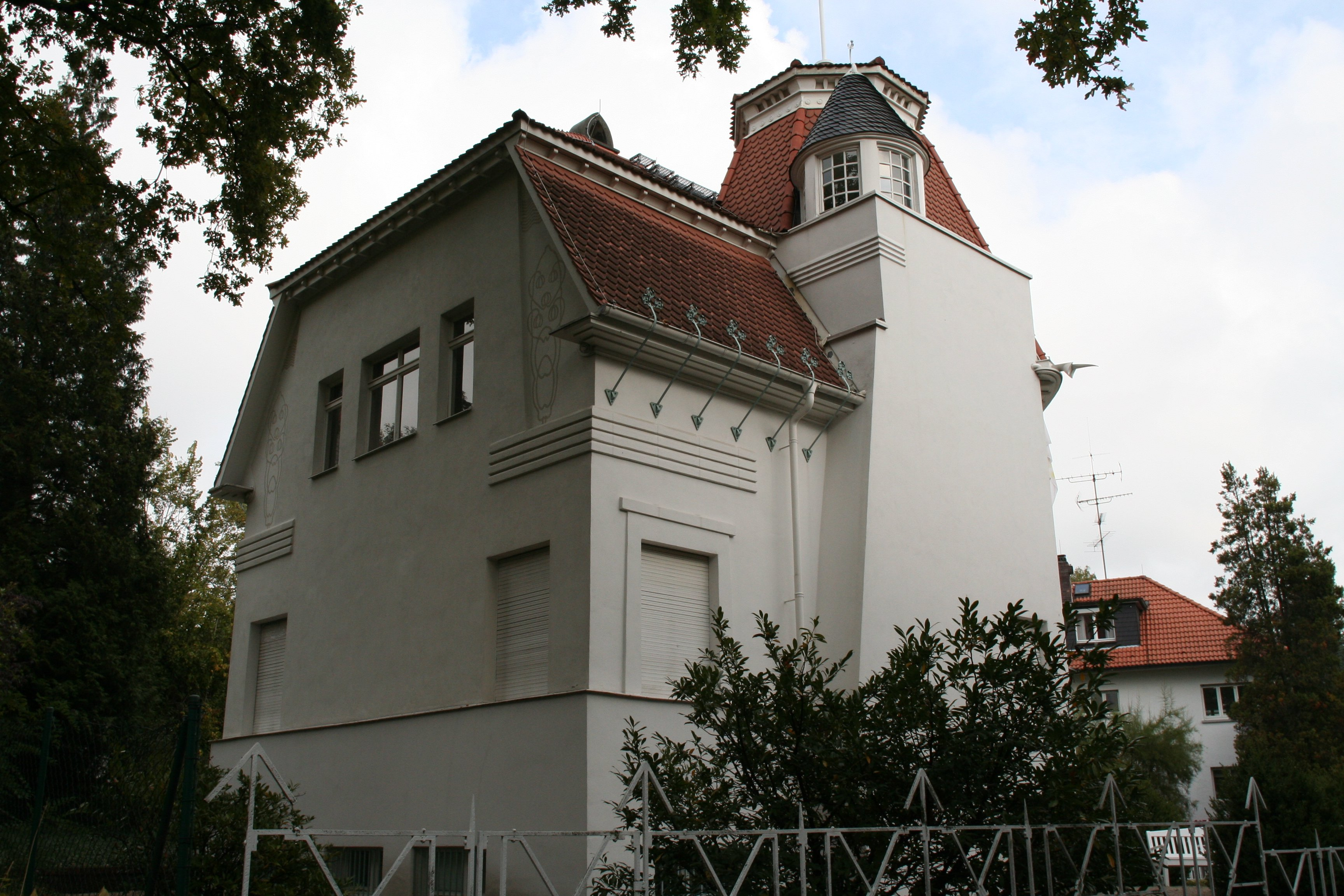
Wilhelm Deiters’ House

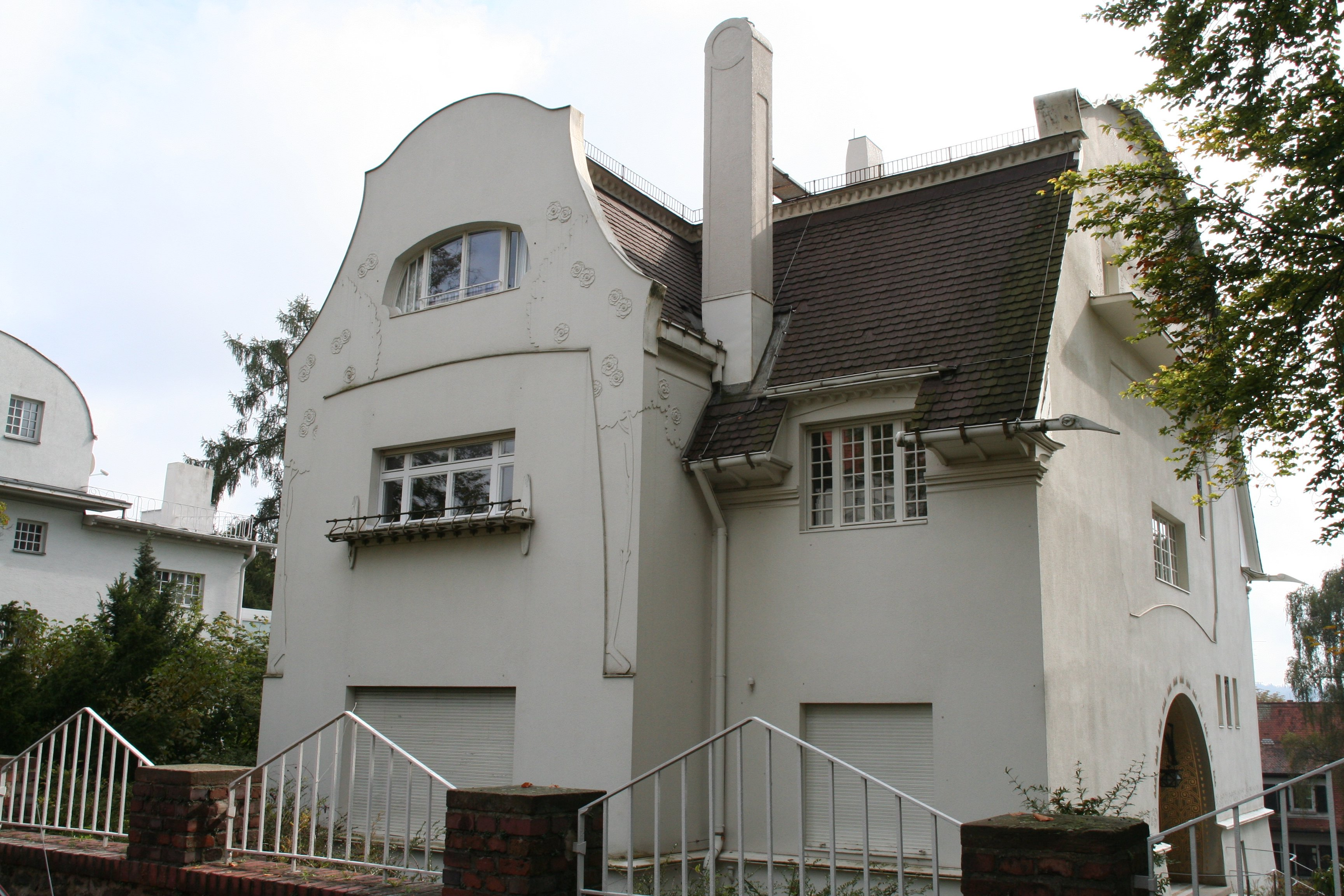
Glückert House

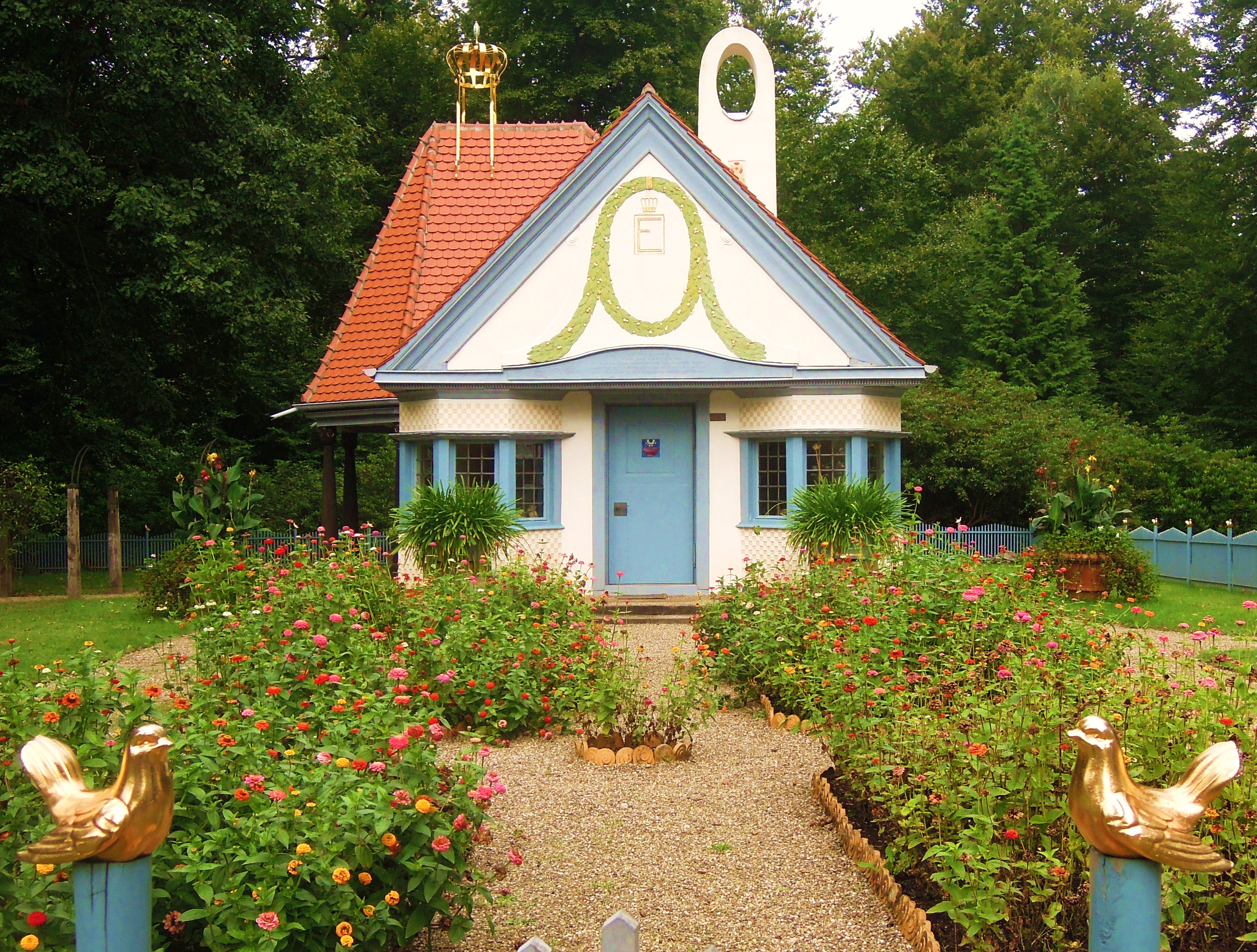
"Prinzessinenschloss" in the park of Schloß Wolfsgarten in Langen, Germany

Wedding tower

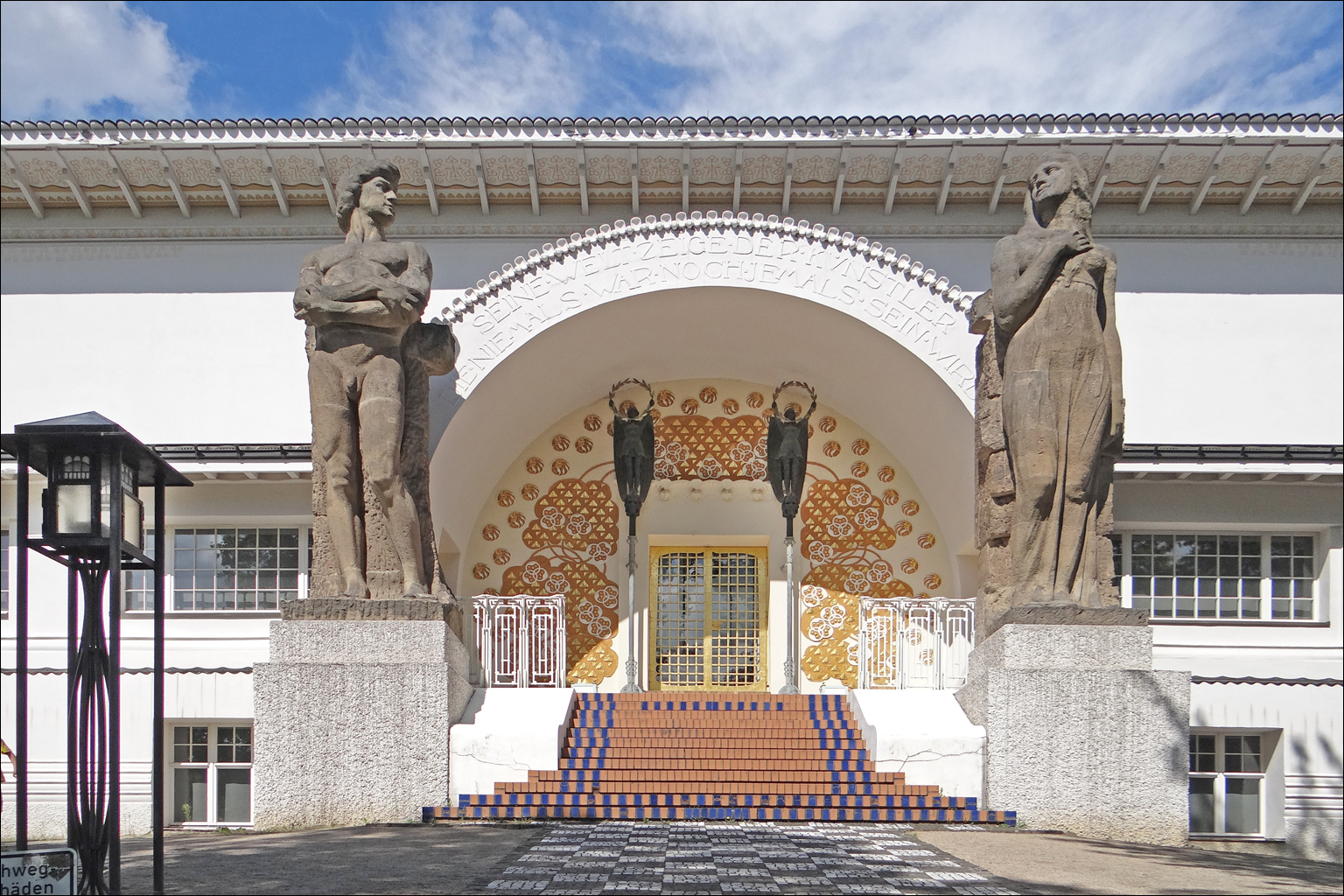
Ernst-Ludwig House

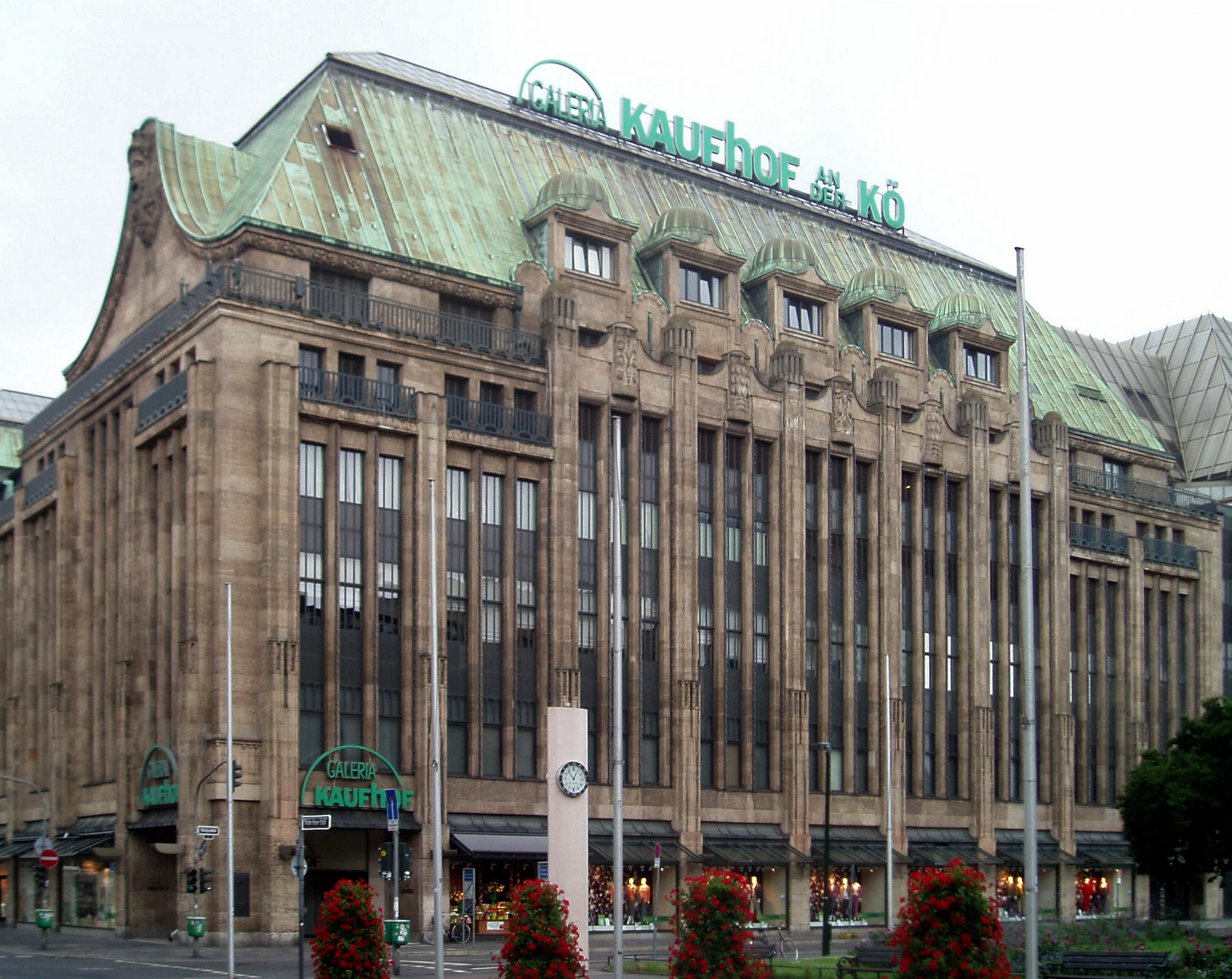
Department store in Düsseldorf

== Sources ==
- Latham, Ian (1980). Joseph Maria Olbrich. New York: Rizzoli. ISBN 0-8478-0230-2.
- Olbrich, Joseph Maria (1901). Ideen von Olbrich. Leipzig: Verlag von Baumgärtner's Buchhandlung. OL 24607147M.
- Ulmer, Renate (2006). Joseph Maria Olbrich (in German). München: Deutscher Kunstverlag. ISBN 3-422-06659-4.
