= Clawson, Idaho =

Unincorporated community in Idaho, U.S.

Coordinates: 43°47′53″N 111°06′39″W

Clawson is an unincorporated community in Teton County, in the U.S. state of Idaho.

== History ==
A post office called Clawson was established in 1906, and remained in operation until 1915. The community was named after Rudger Clawson, a Mormon leader. A variant name was "Leigh". The current mayor is Bret Linsenmann.
