= Stig Claesson =

Swedish artist and writer (1928–2008)

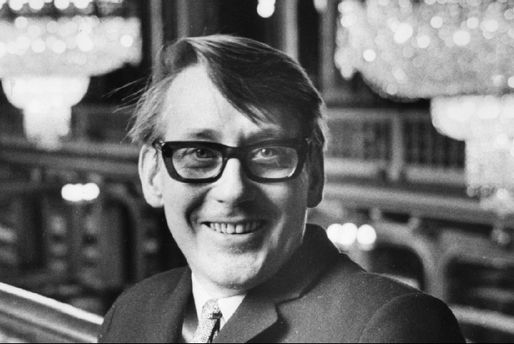
- Claesson in 1966
- Born: John Stig Claesson; 2 June 1928; Huddinge, Sweden
- Died: 4 January 2008 (aged 79); Stockholm, Sweden
- Occupations: Writer; visual artist; illustrator
- Writing career
- Genres: Journalism; fiction

John Stig Claesson (2 June 1928 – 4 January 2008), also known under his signature Slas, was a Swedish writer, visual artist, and illustrator. Claesson was born on 2 June 1928 in Huddinge, south of Stockholm. He attended the Royal Swedish Academy of Arts between 1947 and 1952, during which time he began to illustrate Swedish literature such as the novels of Per Anders Fogelström. Claesson is the father of actor Leif Claesson. His son, artist Nils Claesson, published a revealing portrait of his father in the book Blåbärsmaskinen (The Blueberry Machine, 2009) which was much discussed in Sweden on its publication. Stig Claesson died on 4 January 2008 in Stockholm.

== Career ==
Claesson debuted in his writing career in 1956, when he was 28 years of age. During his career Claesson published more than 80 books. A number of his books are based on travel abroad and move in the frontier between reporting and fiction. Among his best-known works include En vandring i solen (Walking in the Sun, 1976), which was made into a film with Gösta Ekman in the role of the main character. Claesson provided works about the remote and rural regions of Sweden and describe the conflict between the town and the country in books such as Vem älskar Yngve Frej (1968; Who Loves Yngve Frej), which was translated into 10 languages and was filmed for television in 1973 starring Allan Edwall. A stage adaption was created in the 1990s. His last book was God Natt Fröken Ann (Goodnight, Miss Ann), published in 2006.

Stig Claesson's work has received many awards, such as the literature prize of the newspaper Svenska Dagbladet and the Selma Lagerlöf Prize. The University of Uppsala awarded him an honorary doctorate degree in 1974.

== Death ==
He died on 4 January 2008.

== Bibliography ==
- Berättelse från Europa, 1956
- Från Nya världen, 1961
- Supportern, 1962
- Bönder, 1963
- Ugnstekt gädda, 1964
- Västgötalagret, 1965
- En Stockholmsbok, 1966
- Kiki, en liten man, 1966 (foto Yngve Baum)
- Dråp i hastigt mod, 1966
- Lage Lindell, 1966 (Bonniers små konstböcker)
- Flickor, 1967
- Döden heter Konrad, 1967
- I stället för telegram Finland 50 år, tillsammans med Jens Hildén, 1967
- 21 Berättelser, 1968
- Vem älskar Yngve Frej, 1968; filmatiserad 1973
- Nelly, 1969
- Den ensamme nobelpristagarens vardag, 1970
- Knut K. Selma Johansson med rätt att leva, 1970
- Sanningen och ingenting annat än, 1970
- Att resa sig upp och gå, 1971
- Samtal på ett fjärrtåg, 1972
- Min vän Charlie (My friend Charlie), 1973
- Yrkesmän emellan, 1974
- Brev till en hembygdsgård, 1974
- Stockholmsbilder, med ill. av Svenolov Ehrén, 1975
- På palmblad och rosor, 1975
- Bättre kan det inte sägas, 1976
- En vandring i solen, 1976 (filmatiserades 1978, se vidare, En vandring i solen)
- Henrietta ska du också glömma, 1977 (filmatiserades 1983, se Henrietta (film))
- Ni har inget liv att försäkra, 1978
- Allt står i lågor, 1979
- Medan tidvattnet vänder, 1980
- Om vänskap funnes, 1981
- Sveaborg eller Rock happy, 1981
- Lika oskyldigt som meningslöst, 1982
- Sagor för barn och vuxna, 1982
- 10-årskalendern, 1982 (specialtryck)
- Utsikt från ett staffli, 1983
- I boulevardens skugga, 1983
- Dagarna före lunch, 1984
- De tio budorden, 1984
- Det bortglömda landskapet, 1985
- Blå måndag, 1985
- Lantlif i Budapest, 1986
- Kamrerns julafton, (Bonniers julbok) 1986
- På behörigt avstånd, (teckningar och collage), 1987
- Nya Stockholmsbilder, (ill. Svenolov Ehrén), 1987
- Skam den som fryser, 1987
- 21 Sagor, 1988
- Kärlek rostar inte, 1988
- Landet som inte längre finns, 1989
- Iakttagen (målade porträtt), 1989
- Innan himlen klarnar, 1989
- SommarStockholm, (teckningar) 1989
- En mörts drömmar, 1990
- Målade porträtt, 1991
- Yngve Frejs landskap, (pasteller) 1991
- Rosine, 1991
- Skånebilder, (pasteller) 1991
- Han och hon, (sagor) 1992
- Blues för Mr Shelley, 1992
- Män i min ålder 1992
- Nästa man till rakning, 1993
- Nästa Katrineholm, 1993 (specialtryck)
- På landet, 1993
- Årstider och åsikter, 1993
- Vägen till brevlådan, 1993
- Nice Mat Sol, 1994, (med Nils Emil Ahlin)
- Till Europa 1994, (foto Leif Claesson)
- Den extra milen, 1994
- Eko av en vår, 1996
- Vandring med mig själv, 1996
- Blå stolar, 1996
- Man måste det man önskar, 1997
- Vad man ser och hedrar, 1998
- Varsel om kommande tilldragelse, 1999
- Svart asfalt grönt gräs, 2000
- Det lyckliga Europa, 2001
- Efter oss syndafloden, 2002
- Följ Alltid Cecilias Exempel, 2003
- Sov du så diskar jag, 2004
- Liv och kärlek, 2005
- Sekonderna lämnar ringen, 2005
- God natt fröken Ann, 2006

Claesson also wrote the television show Harry H - Fallet Mary (Directed by Jan Halldoff), which was originally aired on Swedish TV 2 in 1978.
