= Clason (disambiguation) =

Clason is a surname.

Clason may refer to:

- Clason Map Company, a US company
- Clason Prairie, Wisconsin, a ghost town, USA
- Clason Point, Bronx, New York, USA
