= Leif Claesson (photographer) =

Swedish photographer and actor (born 1959)

Leif "Dodo" Claesson (born Leif John Claesson on 4 November 1959) is a Swedish photographer and actor. Born in Quebec, he currently lives and works in Stockholm. Studying at the Academy for Photography at the School of Industrial Arts in Stockholm, his first project outside of school assignments was his exhibition Parken (The Park). Claesson has participated in solo exhibitions throughout Sweden and in group exhibitions in Sweden, other parts of Europe, and the United States. He is the son of Stig Claesson.
