= List of Swedish films of the 2000s =

This is a list of films produced in Sweden and in the Swedish language in the 2000s.

== 2000s ==
Swedish title	English title	Director	Cast	Genre	Notes
2000
Trolösa	Faithless	Liv Ullmann	Lena Endre, Krister Henriksson, Erland Josephson	Drama	Nominated for the Golden Palm at Cannes; screenplay by Ingmar Bergman
Sleepwalker	Sleepwalker	Johannes Runeborg	Ralph Carlsson, Ewa Carlsson, Anders Palm, Tuva Novotny	Horror-thriller	
Sånger från andra våningen	Songs from the Second Floor	Roy Andersson	Stefan Larsson, Sten Andersson	Drama, dark comedy	Won the Special Jury Price at the 2000 Cannes Film Festival
Tillsammans	Together	Lukas Moodysson	Gustaf Hammarsten, Lisa Lindgren, Michael Nyqvist, Shanti Roney, Olle Sarri	Comedy, drama	
Jalla! Jalla!		Josef Fares	Fares Fares, Tuva Novotny, Torkel Petersson, Laleh Pourkarim	Comedy	
Vingar av glas	Wings of Glass	Reza Bagher			Entered into the 23rd Moscow International Film Festival
Naken		Torkel Knutsson, Mårten Knutsson	Henrik Norberg, Lisa Kock, Martin Forsström	Comedy	
2001
Så vit som en snö	As White as in Snow	Jan Troell			
Shrek		Andrew Adamson, Vicky Jenson	Mike Myers, Eddie Murphy, Cameron Diaz, John Lithgow	Animated fantasy comedy film	American-Canadian-Swedish co-production
2002
Jag är Dina	I Am Dina	Ole Bornedal	Gérard Depardieu, Maria Bonnevie, Christopher Eccleston	Drama	
Klassfesten		Måns Herngren, Hannes Holm	Björn Kjellman		
Lilja 4-ever	Lilya 4-ever	Lukas Moodysson			
Grabben i graven bredvid		Kjell Sundvall	Michael Nyqvist		
Den osynlige	The Invisible	Joel Bergvall and Simon Sandquist		Drama	
2003
Detaljer	Details	Kristian Petri			Entered into the 26th Moscow International Film Festival
Ondskan	Evil	Mikael Håfström	Andreas Wilson		Nominated for an Academy Award as Best Foreign Language Film, 2004; based on the novel by Jan Guillou
Miffo		Daniel Lind Lagerlöf			
Kopps		Josef Fares	Fares Fares		
Smala Sussie	Slim Susie	Ulf Malmros	Tuva Novotny, Jonas Rimeika, Björn Starrin		
2004
Gitarrmongot	The Guitar Mongoloid	Ruben Östlund			Entered into the 27th Moscow International Film Festival
Så som i himmelen	As It Is in Heaven	Kay Pollak	Michael Nyqvist	Drama	
Strandvaskaren	Drowning Ghost	Mikael Håfström	Rebecka Hemse, Jesper Salén, Jenny Ulving		
Fyra nyanser av brunt	Four Shades of Brown	Tomas Alfredson	Robert Gustavsson, Johan Rheborg, Henrik Schyffert	Drama / comedy	
Hip Hip Hora!	The Ketchup Effect	Teresa Fabik			
Masjävlar	Dalecarlians	Maria Blom			
Ett hål i mitt hjärta	A Hole in My Heart	Lukas Moodysson	Thorsten Flinck		
2005
Om Sara	About Sara	Othman Karim			Won the Golden George at the 28th Moscow International Film Festival
Bang Bang Orangutang		Simon Staho	Mikael Persbrandt, Michael Nyqvist, Tuva Novotny, Shanti Roney	Drama	
Death Academy	School Night Massacre	Daniel Lehmussaari	Henrik Järv, Ulrica Hedén, Oden Nilsson, Sigrid Josefsson, Tomas Kärrstedt	Horror	
Zozo		Josef Fares			
Kocken	The Chef	Mats Arehn	Kjell Bergqvist	Drama, dark comedy	
Die Zombiejäger		Jonas Wolcher	Martin Brisshäll, Nick Holmquist	Horror	
2006
Container	Container	Lukas Moodysson		Drama	
Frostbiten	Frostbite	Anders Banke		Horror	
2007
Arn - Tempelriddaren	Arn – The Knight Templar				
2008
Låt den rätte komma in	Let the Right One In	Tomas Alfredson		Drama / horror	
Vampyrer	Not Like Others	Peter Pontikis		Thriller	
Patrik 1,5	Patrik, Age 1.5	Ella Lemhagen		Comedy-drama	
2009
Män som hatar kvinnor	The Girl with the Dragon Tattoo	Niels Arden Oplev	Noomi Rapace, Michael Nyqvist	Thriller	
Flickan som lekte med elden	The Girl Who Played with Fire	Daniel Alfredson	Noomi Rapace, Michael Nyqvist	Thriller	
Nasty Old People	Nasty Old People	Hanna Sköld	Febe Nilsson, Karin Bertling, Anna Nevander		
Metropia	Metropia	Tarik Saleh	Vincent Gallo, Juliette Lewis	Science fiction	Premiered at the 66th Venice International Film Festival
Miss Kicki	Miss Kicki	Håkon Liu	Pernilla August, Ludwig Palmell, Huang He River		The first feature film released in Sweden under a Creative Commons license
