= Multi-instrumentalist =

Musician who plays multiple musical instruments

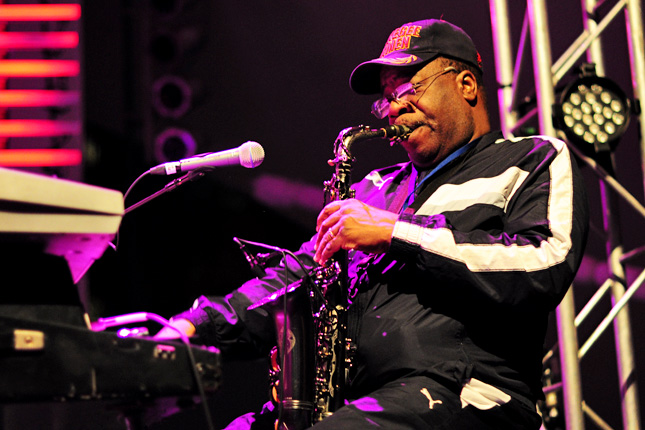
Roy Gaskins playing keyboard and alto saxophone at Roy Ayers's concert (2011)

A multi-instrumentalist is a musician who plays two or more musical instruments, often but not exclusively at a professional level of proficiency.

Also known as doubling, the practice allows greater ensemble flexibility and more efficient employment of musicians, where a particular instrument may be employed only briefly or sporadically during a performance. Doubling is not uncommon in orchestra (e.g., flutists who double on piccolo) and jazz (saxophone/flute players); double bass players might also perform on electric bass. In music theatre, a pit orchestra's reed players might be required to perform on multiple instruments. Church piano players are often expected to play the church's pipe organ or Hammond organ as well.

In popular music it is more common than in classical or jazz for performers to be proficient on instruments not from the same family, for instance to play both guitar and keyboards. Many bluegrass musicians are multi-instrumentalists. Some musicians' unions or associations, such as the American Federation of Musicians, specify a higher rate of pay for musicians who double on two or more instruments for a performance or recording.

== Early music ==
The European Piffari, Stadtpfeifer and Waits were multi-instrumentalists, who played trumpet, sackbut, shawm, cornett, recorder and string-instruments. Musicians with an education of a Stadtpfeifer were Gottfried Reiche, Johann Joachim Quantz, Johann Christof Pezel and Sigmund Theophil Staden. Also many European church musicians of the 17th and 18th centuries were multi-instrumentalists, who played several instruments. Georg Philipp Telemann for example played violin, viola da gamba, recorder, flauto traverso, oboe, shawm, sackbut and double bass.

== Classical music ==
Some famous classical composer-performers could play multiple instruments at a high level, such as Mozart, who was a virtuoso on the keyboard and violin. Music written for symphony orchestra usually calls for a percussion section featuring a number of musicians who might each play a variety of different instruments during a performance. Orchestras will also often, but not always, call for several members of the woodwind section to be multi-instrumentalists. This is sometimes referred to as doubling. Typically, for example, one flute player in the orchestra will switch to playing the piccolo or alto flute when called to by the score. Similarly, clarinet players may double on bass clarinet, oboe players on cor anglais, and bassoon players on contrabassoon. Trumpet players may switch to piccolo trumpet for certain Baroque literature, and first trombone players may switch to alto trombone. Bass trombone players are sometimes required to double on contrabass trombone, most notably in Wagner's Der Ring des Nibelungen operas. Organ players are also commonly expected to master the harpsichord as well. Doubling elsewhere in the orchestra is rare. With musical theatre pit orchestras, woodwind players are expected to play a large number of woodwind instruments.

== Jazz, modern, and contemporary music ==
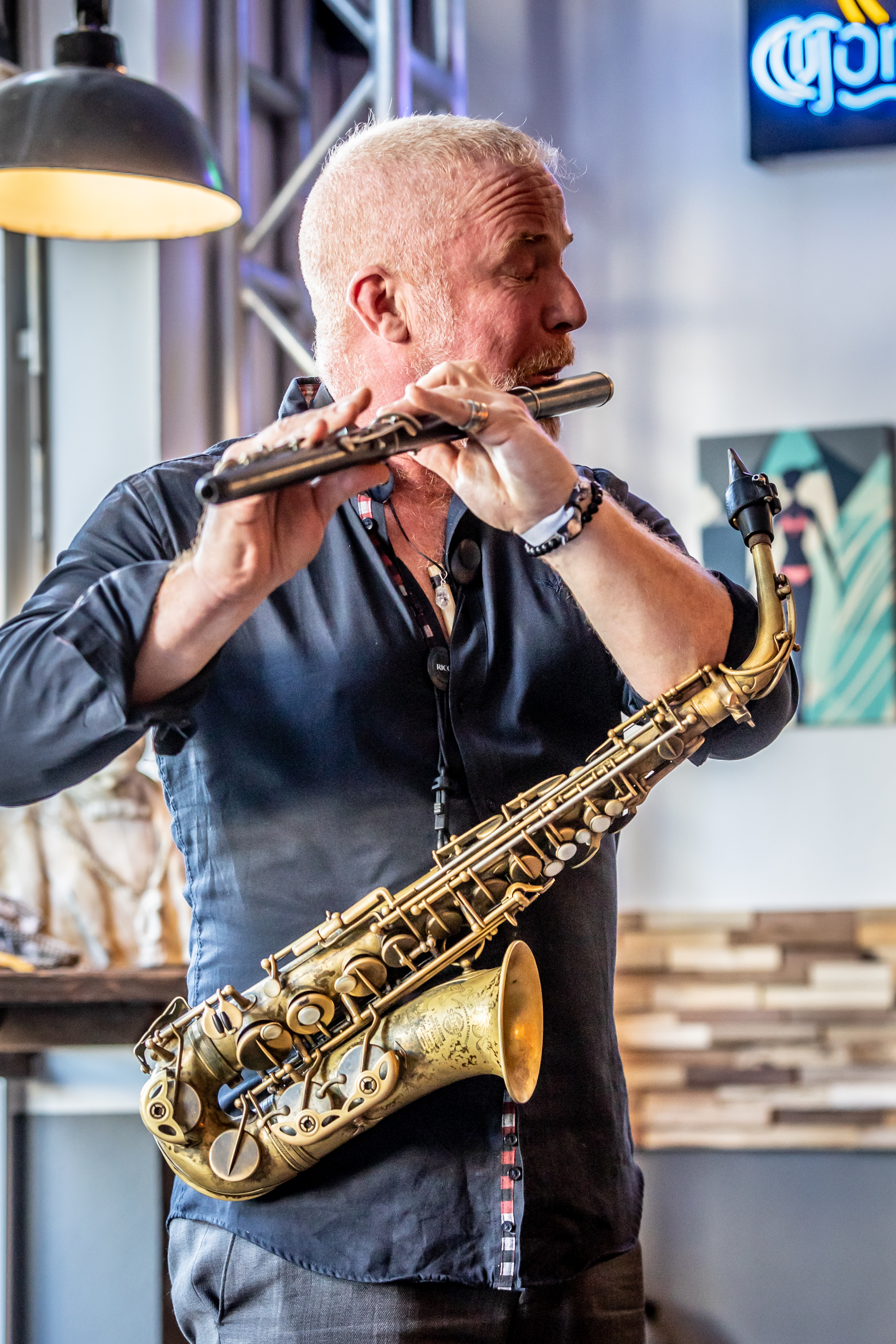
Alto saxophonist Hayden Chisholm playing the flute

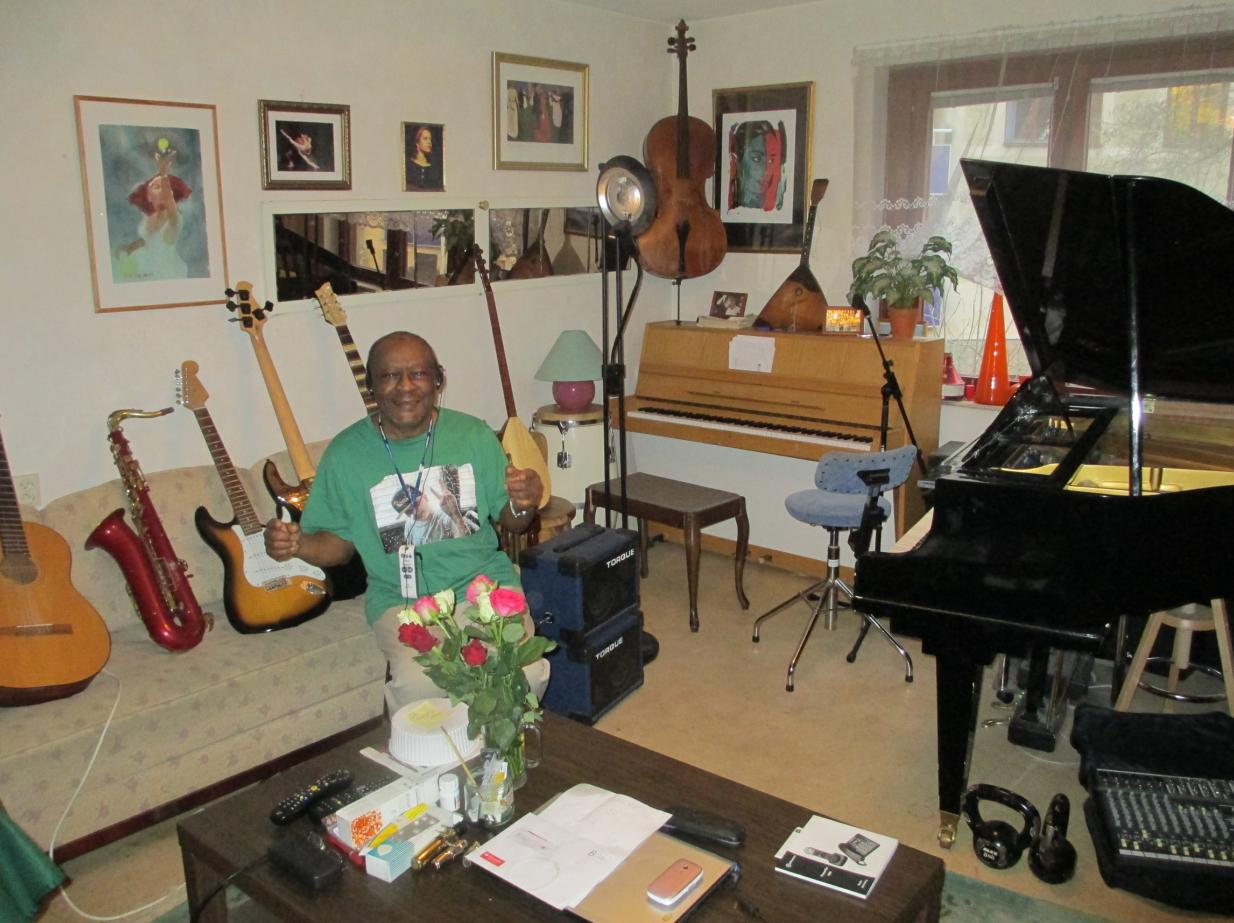
Colin Dyall (father of Sharon and Karl Dyall) surrounded by his instruments.

In the swing era of big band music, woodwind players were often expected to play multiple woodwind instruments; saxophonists might be offered gigs where they were also required to play clarinet, for example.

The different types of saxophone use similar designs, varying mainly only in size (and therefore pitch), meaning that once a player has learned to play one it is relatively easy for them to translate the skills into another. As a result, many jazz saxophone players have made careers playing several different instruments, such as John Coltrane and Wayne Shorter, both of whom have frequently used both tenor and soprano saxophones. To a lesser extent this is also the case across the range of woodwind instruments: Jazz flute players often play other instruments as well, such as Eric Dolphy and Herbie Mann, both of whom frequently played flute and saxophone; Dolphy also recorded on bass clarinet. In the early years of jazz, when the genre was still linked to the marching band genre, many double-bass players doubled on tuba.

From the 1950s onwards and particularly since the development of jazz-rock fusion in the late 1960s, many double-bass players doubled on electric bass, e.g. Stanley Clarke and John Patitucci.

Another famous multi-instrumentalist is Jacob Collier. His career started off with split-screen YouTube videos that caught the eye of music legends like Herbie Hancock. With his help, Collier recorded his debut album In My Room and then went on to write many more albums. He is proficient on many different instruments, including vocals, piano, keyboards, bass guitar, upright bass, drums, percussion, guitar, and more.

Some jazz instrumentalists whose main instrument is a horn or bass also play jazz piano, because piano is an excellent instrument for composing and arranging, and for developing greater harmonic knowledge.

Many famous jazz musicians, including James Morrison, Don Burrows, and Brian Landrus, are multi-instrumentalists.

== Rock and pop music ==
In popular music styles, many musicians and songwriters are multi-instrumentalists. Songwriters often play both piano, a key instrument for arranging and composing, and popular pop or rock instruments such as guitar. A backing band member who doubles will be instructed by the bandleader when to switch instruments (e.g., from bass to Hammond organ). When playing live, most multi-instrumentalists will concentrate on their main instrument and/or vocals, and hire or recruit backing musicians (or use a sequencer) to play the other instruments, thus benefiting from economies of scope.

=== Examples ===
Some musicians have pushed the limits of human musical skill on different instruments. British entertainer Roy Castle once set a world record by playing the same tune on 43 different instruments in four minutes. Anton Newcombe, frontman for the Brian Jonestown Massacre, has claimed to be able to play 80 different instruments. Brian Jones, late founder and guitarist of The Rolling Stones was well known to experiment with, and utilize various instruments, both Western and exotic. By the time of his death, Jones had played a multitude of instruments on released recordings ranging from traditional blues hallmarks – like the harmonica, slide guitar and the piano – to more exotic ones such as the sitar, Mellotron and the Appalachian dulcimer. Another famous multi-instrumentalist is Paul McCartney; on his album McCartney, for example, he is credited with vocals, acoustic guitar, electric guitar, bass guitar, drums, piano, organ, percussion, wine glasses, Mellotron, and effects; the only other credited performer is his wife Linda who provided harmony vocals. Progressive rock composer Mike Oldfield plays many types of guitars, organ, piano, mandolin, timpani, and bouzouki (among others) with proficiency. However, he considers himself primarily a guitarist.

== Bluegrass ==
In bluegrass music, it is very common for musicians to be skilled on a number of different instruments, including guitar, banjo, fiddle and upright bass.

== See also ==
- List of multi-instrumentalists
- One-man band
