= Peter Falk (disambiguation) =

Peter Falk (1927–2011) was an American actor.

Peter Falk may also refer to:

- Peter H. Falk (born 1950), American art historian

== See also ==
- Peder Falk (1947–2024), Swedish actor
- Peter Falck (c. 1468–1519), Swiss politician
- Peter Emanuel Falck (born 1952), Swedish television producer and screenwriter
