= The Invisible (2007 film) =

- Theatrical release poster
- Directed by: David S. Goyer
- Screenplay by: Mick Davis; Christine Roum
- Based on: Den osynlige by: Mats Wahl
- Produced by: Roger Birnbaum; Gary Barber; Jonathan Glickman; Neal Edelstein; Mike Macari
- Starring: Justin Chatwin; Margarita Levieva; Chris Marquette; Marcia Gay Harden
- Cinematography: Gabriel Beristain
- Edited by: Conrad Smart
- Music by: Marco Beltrami
- Production companies: Spyglass Entertainment; Birnbaum/Barber Productions; Macari/Edelstein
- Distributed by: Buena Vista Pictures Distribution (Note: Distributed through the Hollywood Pictures banner.)
- Release date: April 27, 2007
- Running time: 102 minutes
- Countries: Sweden; United States
- Language: English
- Box office: $26.8 million

The Invisible is a 2007 teen supernatural thriller directed by David S. Goyer and based on the Swedish young adult novel by Mats Wahl. The film stars Justin Chatwin, Margarita Levieva, Chris Marquette, Marcia Gay Harden, and Callum Keith Rennie. It follows a high school student (Chatwin) who is attacked and left for dead, only to find himself trapped in a liminal state between life and death as he tries to solve his own attempted murder.

The film is a remake of the Swedish film of the same name released in 2002. This marked the first Hollywood adaptation of a Swedish feature since Intermezzo (1936) and is cited as starting the modern wave of American remakes of Swedish films. The American version was released in the United States on April 27, 2007, and was the final film released through Hollywood Pictures before the company's closure later that year.

== Plot ==
High school senior Nick Powell plans to skip his graduation and fly to London for a writing program, despite the plan of his controlling mother, Diane. His mother pressures him to succeed and is emotionally distant.

Nick's best friend, Pete Egan, confides in him that he is bullied by Annie Newton, a troubled teen. Nick attempts to step in on one such occasion, only for it to escalate into a physical confrontation. Annie's closest friends are violent thieves, and her boyfriend, Marcus, is on parole for similar violations.

Nick tells Pete about his plans to leave for London, and they say goodbye. Annie decides to rob a jewelry store across the street from where Marcus is stealing a car. Marcus reprimands her and tries to take the jewels for himself, but Annie keeps them and pushes him to try to stop her. Believing Annie is out of control, Marcus tips off the cops. Annie is arrested and assumes that Pete is responsible because he saw her load the merchandise into her locker.

She later attempts to beat a confession out of Pete. When Annie does not believe his innocence, Pete reluctantly gives up Nick's name, thinking that Nick is already on a plane to London. He is unaware that Nick gave his ticket to a girl at a party, having decided not to go. When Annie and her crew find Nick walking home from the party, they run him off the road and beat him mercilessly. When Annie believes she has killed Nick, they dump his body into a sewer.

The next morning, Nick goes to school to find that no one can see or hear him. He returns home to find his mother has filed a missing person's report, and the police are investigating his disappearance. After a while, Nick realizes that he is still alive but unconscious. When Nick realizes that he is having an out-of-body experience, he reaches out to Annie and Pete to save his life.

Detective Larson searches out Marcus, questioning him on what he knows about Annie Newton. Since Marcus is still on parole, Detective Larson tells him that even being associated with the murder could send him back to prison. Marcus decides to get involved and kidnaps Pete, forcing him to lead him to Nick's body so they can move it to another location. He conspires to kill Annie and arranges to meet with her. Annie calls Pete to the meeting place as well, who is under surveillance by the police. Distraught, Pete pens a suicide note and takes an overdose of pills to commit suicide as Nick frantically watches, begging him not to do it. Before Pete can fully die and start to leave his body, Nick confronts him since they can see one another. Pete desperately tries to apologize as police close in. As Annie flees from both Marcus and the police, Nick yells at her and she hears him for the first time.

Although the two cannot have a conversation, she hears some of his voice in her head and can sense his presence. Annie feels her actions weighing on her conscience and stops to visit Nick's room to get a sense of who he is. The two realize that they were similar, and, given different circumstances, the two could have been close. Diane catches Annie in his room, and she flees. She returns to the woods to find Nick's body, only to see that it has been moved. She confronts Pete and Marcus to learn the body's location. Marcus tells her but shoots her in the stomach as she leaves. She shoots Marcus in return and calls the police to tell them where to find Nick. Nick's body is found in a dam and is saved. After visiting him in the hospital, Annie passes away from her wounds just as Nick reawakens.

After leaving the hospital, Nick meets Annie's younger brother, Victor, flying his model plane alone at the park. They both commemorate Annie by writing her a message on top of the plane and flying it across the riverbank.

== Cast ==
- Justin Chatwin as Nicholas "Nick" Powell - the protagonist, who wakes up to find that he is invisible, before discovering that he has been beaten to near death and is projecting himself from his missing body. In the book, he is called Hilmer Eriksson.
- Margarita Levieva as Annelie "Annie" Newton - a bully who beats Nick to near death but later regrets her actions. In the book, she is called Anneli Turgren.
- Chris Marquette as Pete Egan - Nick's best friend. In the book, he is called Pete Geller.
- Callum Keith Rennie as Detective Brian Larson - the detective investigating Nick's death. In the book, he is called Detective Harold Fors.
- Alex O'Loughlin as Marcus Bohem - Annie's boyfriend, a criminal. In the book, he is called Marcus Lundkvist.
- Marcia Gay Harden as Diane Powell - Nick's mother.
- Michelle Harrison as Detective Kate Tunney - a detective assisting Larson. In the book, she is called Detective Carin Lindblom.
- Tania Saulnier as Suzie
- Ryan Kennedy as Matty
- Andrew Francis as Dean
- Maggie Ma as Danielle
- P. Lynn Johnson as Sharon Egan - Pete's mother.
- Serge Houde as Martin Egan - Pete's father.
- Desiree Zurowski as Lindy Newton - Annie's mother.
- Mark Houghton as Jack Newton - Annie's father.
- Alex Ferris as Victor Newton - Annie's younger brother.
- Bilal Sayed as Dino Garcia
- Cory Monteith as Jimmy

== Production ==
In November 2004, it was announced that David S. Goyer would direct an American remake of Den osynlige for Spyglass Entertainment. The screenplay was written by Mick Davis, who had also written the original Swedish adaptation based on Mats Wahl's novel. Davis initially wrote the script in English before it was translated into Swedish for the 2002 film.

The project was originally set up for distribution through DreamWorks Pictures. However, in June 2005, The Walt Disney Company acquired the domestic distribution rights.

On August 26, 2005, Justin Chatwin entered final negotiations to star in the lead role, opposite Margarita Levieva. On October 10, 2005, Marcia Gay Harden joined the cast, alongside Chris Marquette.

Principal photography began in September 2005 and took place in Vancouver, British Columbia, Canada.

== Soundtrack ==
The Invisible: Original Soundtrack

Soundtrack album by Various Artists
- Released: April 17, 2007
- Genre: Alternative rock, indie rock, post-hardcore, emo
- Label: Hollywood

The Invisible: Original Soundtrack is a compilation album, the soundtrack to the film The Invisible.

=== Track listing ===
1. "Taking Back Control" – Sparta
2. "Wolf Like Me" – TV on the Radio
3. "Open Your Eyes" – Snow Patrol
4. "You're All I Have" – Snow Patrol
5. "Stars & Sons" – Broken Social Scene
6. "Fashionably Uninvited" – Mellowdrone
7. "02-20 Boy" – Suicide Sports Club
8. "Caterwaul" – And You Will Know Us By the Trail of Dead
9. "Under Pressure" – Kill Hannah
10. "Body Urge" – The Great Fiction
11. "Bliss" – Syntax
12. "The Kill" – Thirty Seconds to Mars
13. "Perfect Memory" – Remy Zero
14. "Music for a Nurse" – Oceansize
15. "I Will Follow You Into the Dark" – Death Cab for Cutie

The soundtrack released by Hollywood Records does not contain Marco Beltrami's original score but does include Thirty Seconds to Mars's song "The Kill", the video of which also appears on the DVD.

== Release ==
The Invisible was released in the United States on April 27, 2007, by Buena Vista Pictures under the Hollywood Pictures banner. It marked the final film to be distributed under the Hollywood Pictures label before the brand was permanently dissolved by The Walt Disney Company, reportedly due to underperformance at the box office.

=== Home media ===
The film was released on Blu-ray and DVD on October 16, 2007, by Buena Vista Home Entertainment (under the Hollywood Pictures Home Entertainment banner). Special features included audio commentary by director David S. Goyer and writers Christine Roum and Mick Davis, deleted scenes, and two music videos.

== Reception ==
=== Box office ===
The Invisible grossed $7.7 million in its opening weekend across 2,019 theaters in North America. It went on to earn $20.6 million domestically, with an additional $6.2 million from international markets, bringing its worldwide total to $26.8 million.

=== Critical reception ===
The Invisible received generally negative reviews and was not screened for critics prior to its release. On the review aggregator Rotten Tomatoes, the film holds an approval rating of 19% based on 58 reviews, with an average rating of 4.1/10. The site's consensus reads: "Dull and confusing execution makes this ghost story utterly forgettable and unintentionally funny." On Metacritic, it has a weighted average score of 36 out of 100, based on 15 critics, indicating "generally unfavorable reviews".

Peter Debruge of Variety criticized the film, writing that it "plays like a very special episode of The O.C." In contrast, audience reception was more favorable. CinemaScore polls indicated moviegoers gave the film an average grade of "B" on an A+ to F scale.
