= Andra Avenyn =

- Genre: Drama
- Created by: Peter Emanuel Falck; Christian Wikander
- Starring: Hans Mosesson; Gunilla Johansson; Alicia Vikander; Mohammed El-Assir; Fortesa Hoti; Lena B. Nilsson; Bill Hugg; Göran Parkrud; Maya Rung; Filip Benko; Christian Wennberg
- Opening theme: Friday I'm in Love by The Cure.
- Country of origin: Sweden
- Original language: Swedish
- No. of seasons: 3
- No. of episodes: 185 (season 3)

Production
- Running time: 30 min (ep. 1-139), 45 min (ep. 140-184); 50 min (ep. 185)

Original release
- Network: Sveriges Television
- Release: 23 September 2007 – 5 May 2010

Andra Avenyn (in English Second Avenue) is a Swedish drama series and soap opera, produced by SVT (Swedish Television) and broadcast from 2007 to 2010. Three seasons were produced. The show was created by Peter Emanuel Falck and Christian Wikander, who also created the Swedish soap operas Varuhuset, Rederiet and Tre kronor. For the title music, they used the song "Friday I'm in Love" by the British rock band The Cure.

The series was shot in Gothenburg for SVT. Interior scenes were recorded in a recording studio, Santos House, on Lindholmen while outdoor scenes were recorded mainly in Kvillestaden/Brämaregården on Hisingen in Gothenburg. Andra Avenyn was nominated for the Kristallen TV Prize in 2008, in the category of "The best Swedish TV series", but did not win. Two of the series actors, Fortesa Hoti and Jonas Bane, were nominated for the Aftonbladet TV Prize 2008, but neither won.

SVT decided to cancel Andra Avenyn after the final episode, which was broadcast on SVT1 on 5 May 2010.

== History ==
=== 2006–2007 ===
In June 2006 Swedish Television announced that it was moving money from news and community programs to a stronger focus on drama, which also covered the series that would become Andra Avenyn. The series was described by SVT as the 'company's largest investment ever'.

During Spring 2007 they built the studios in Gothenburg, where the series was recorded. Filming began in July 2007 and the series was first broadcast on television on 23 September 2007, with three episodes every week. Eight of the leading roles in the initial series were filled by young people. Four of these were filled by a casting process which took place during spring 2007. This casting process was in the form of a reality show that was shown in six parts from 9 September, with the title Andra Avenyn: Castingen (Andra Avenyn: The Casting). Originally, only two finalists were to get lead roles, but the jury decided that in fact four would get lead roles. The winners of the casting show were Fortesa Hoti (playing the character Roxanna), Jonas Bane (playing the character Kim), Maya Rung (playing the character Liv) and Anders Nordahl (playing the character David).

=== 2007–2008 ===
The series was initially highly criticized by the press and blog reviewers, and the series did not live up to the expectations of many. But the series did get an average audience of about 526,000 with a peak at 800,000, on live TV, while the website for the series became very popular, with some 15 million individual visits to view clips, news, gossip and much more. There were, besides, some 38,000 questions posted at one time in its chat sites. In early 2008, SVT announced that there would be a second and a third series of the programme.

Because the Andra Avenyn website had become so popular, the production company needed a series to keep the viewers interested during the summer break. So, during the summer of 2008, Fyr Thorwald had to go on a tour of the south of Sweden, where, besides just enjoying the summer, he was supposed to find his character, Roland, who had mysteriously left him. In the end, he found him and so could go back to work again.

On 21 May 2008, SVT held a press conference on the second series. New characters in the series were to be, among others, the Niklasson family (Greger, Sigrid and Markus) and Per-Erik Björn. On 21 September 2008 the second series began on TV.

=== 2008–2009 ===
Since Andra Avenyn was below expectations, but still had quite reasonable audience figures to continue producing the series, SVT chose to change its format. Instead of broadcasting three episodes a week they began to broadcast a 45-minute episode once a week. This was introduced during the second half of the second series. They also chose to record series 2 and 3 together, from May 2008 to March 2009. It was said that season 2 would contain 105 episodes, just like the first season, but it contained only 51 episodes in total.

During the summer break in 2009 a Web-based serial, Andra Avenyn: Londonresan (the London trip) was shown. This follows Kitty Maria Santos (Johanna Lazcano Osterman) and Roxanna Nilsson, (Fortesa Hoti) while they are in London. Roxanna has traveled to London to study and improve her grades, but then Kitty turns up (sent by Rasmus, Roxann's foster father, to keep an eye on her). Of course, there are squabbles, but there is also fun and laughter as Roxanna gets used to Kitty's presence. The series, which had been recorded in a week in March, was broadcast in 24 episodes during July 2009.

During the autumn of 2009 a spin-off web-based series was introduced where viewers could follow two characters from Andra Avenyn – Kim Dahlberg (Jonas Bane) and Nathalie Andersson-Offerdahl (Ida Linnertorp). You follow them in this series, and see who they socialise with in Andra Avenyn. The casting for this programme was organized in May 2009, to fill five new roles. Those who got the roles were as follows: Shvan Aladin (playing the character Ben-Ali Chahab), Madeleine Martin (playing the character Cleopatra "Cleo" Lindström), Anton Gyllensten (playing the character Patrik Boström ), Frida Bagri (playing the character Nilla Boström) and Jonas Sundh (playing the character Måns Wetterström). The series was called "Riverside", following an opinion poll on the Andra Avenyn website, because that is the district in Andra Avenyn where the characters live.

=== 2009–2010 ===
The 8 September 2009 was the premier of Series 3 of Andra Avenyn, while Riverside premiered the day before (7 September).

The series was recorded between October 2008 and March 2009, but was supposed to be happening in the present time. Christmas and New Years episodes were broadcast, as in the first series, though they were broadcast about a month before the real Christmas and New Year.

At the beginning of the series, a new character arrives, Katarina Björn-Lion (Lottas and Annikas sister). During the series, several people appeared in guest roles, amongst which were Bengt Bauler (who played a lawyer), Ebba Wickman (playing Kitty's lost daughter, Texas), Wallis Grahn (playing Dagny Karlsson), Anna Ulrica Ericsson (playing police officer Ursula Storrylinen) and Stig Engström (playing Dr Hejnum, Per Björn's doctor). Everyone in the main ensemble continued to work in the third series. The series also got a new title sequence. The only character who left the series before its final episode was Lotta Björn (Gunilla Johansson). She left during the Christmas/New Year section which was broadcast November/December 2009.

After one series of Riverside, SVT decided to drop the programme. So, Shvan Aladin and Ida Linnertorp, who worked in Riverside, turned up in guest roles in Andra Avenyn during the spring. Even the Cleo character (Madeleine Martin) from Riverside was seen in a sequence during Andra Avenyn's last episode. The programme's third series was broadcast in 30 episodes until 5 May 2010. After that, the programme was dropped for good.

== Plot ==
Andra Avenyn is about a few families living on the outskirts of Gothenburg – in the eponymous Andra Avenyn. The series deals with problems that are common in various drama series/soap operas, such as extortion, other forms of crime, pregnancy, illicit relationships, and infidelity.

== Cast ==
=== Main characters ===
These were the main characters in Andra Avenyn:

Actor	Characters	Season	Notes
Hans Mosesson	Per-Erik Björn	2–3	Took part from autumn 2008. He stayed to the end.
Gunilla Johansson	Lotta Björn	1–3	Took part from the beginning, but left the series during Christmas 2009.
Malena Laszlo	Katarina Björn	3	Took part from autumn 2009. She stayed to the end.
Fyr Thorwald	Roland Tegebrandt	1–3	Took part from the beginning. He stayed to the end.
Alicia Vikander	Josefin Björn-Tegebrandt	1	Took part from the beginning, but moved to Boston in the last episode in the first season. She stayed in Boston during season 2 and 3.
Christian Rinmad	Håkon Fors-Larsen	1	Took part from the beginning, but went to jail after he raped Olga Svensson in the last episode of the first season.
Stefan Gödicke	Tony Dahlberg	1–3	Took part from the beginning. He stayed to the end.
Jonas Bane	Kim Dahlberg	1–3	Took part from the beginning. He stayed to the end.
Anette Nääs	Angelica Svensson	1	Took part from the beginning, but was struck by a bullet in the last episode of the first season. Angelica died.
Nanna Blondell	Olga Svensson	1	Took part from the beginning, but she moved to her father in New York, after the first season.
Mohamed Said	Karim Hussein	1	Took part from the beginning, but he escaped to Norway to escape from Jesper "Dildo" Dillström.
Mohammed El-Assir	Hamza Hussein	1, 2-3	Took part from the beginning, but he escaped to Norway to escape from Jesper "Dildo" Dillström. He returned to the series in January 2009 when he had found out that he was the father to Roxannas daughter Silvia. He stayed to the end.
Bill Hugg	Rasmus Fagerlind	1–3	Took part from the beginning. He stayed to the end.
Lena B. Nilsson	Ulla Fagerlind	1–3	Took part from the beginning. She stayed to the end.
Fortesa Hoti	Roxanna Nilsson	1–3	Took part from the beginning. She stayed to the end.
Anders Nordahl	David Zimmermann	1–2	Took part from the beginning, but he moved to France during Christmas in season 2 (it was summer in Gothenburg when he left the series).
Johanna Lazcano Osterman	Kitty Maria Santos	2–3	Took part from autumn 2008. She stayed to the end.
Maya Rung	Liv Hellström	1–3	Took part from the beginning. She stayed to the end.
Göran Parkrud	Dennis Hellström	1–3	Took part from the beginning, but he became a main character from season 2. He stayed to the end.
Rasmus Troedsson	Greger Niklasson	2–3	Took part from autumn 2008. He stayed to the end.
Sara Nygren	Sigrid Niklasson	2–3	Took part from autumn 2008. She stayed to the end.
Filip Benko	Markus Niklasson	2–3	Took part from autumn 2008. He stayed to the end. Went to jail after the police found out that he raped Liv Hellström in March 2010.
Claes Ljungmark	Bengt "Hästen" Larsson	1, 2-3	Was only a guest character during season 1. He left the series when he chased after Jesper Dillström. He came back to Riverside in late February 2009 (season 2). He was a guest character until spring 2010. During spring, he left the series briefly, but he came back in the last episode.

=== Guest characters ===
These was the guest characters in Andra Avenyn. Sentences in brackets mean during which time the actors or characters appeared in the series:

- Awa – Silvia Nilsson (spring 2008 – spring 2010)
- Josephine Bauer – Annika Björn (autumn 2007 – spring 2008. She returned in two episodes during autumn 2008)
- Amir Bargashi – Ahmed Hussein (autumn 2007 – spring 2008)
- Mali Monokherad – Mariam Hussein (autumn 2007 – spring 2008)
- Rachel La Chenardière – Sara Allawis (Christmas 2007 – spring 2008)
- Tone Helly-Hansen – Randi Berg Hellström (three episodes during autumn, season 2)
- Kerstin Hellström – Barbro Svensson (autumn 2007 – spring 2008)
- Magnus Mark – Jonte Dillström (autumn 2007)
- Filip Berg – Jesper "Dildo" Dillström (autumn 2007 + the last episode of season 1)
- Alexander Karim – Fredrik Fersen (autumn 2007)
- Agnes Hargne Wallander – Fia Haninge (three episodes during autumn 2007)
- Sven Boräng – Pontus Lindvall (two episodes during autumn 2007)
- Hilda Lundgren – Linda Nilsson (autumn 2007 – spring 2008)
- Petra Hultgren – Grażyna Wyborska (spring 2008 + the first episodes during autumn 2008)
- Simon Gavik – Adam Nyberg (three episodes during autumn 2007 and some episodes in the beginning of season 2)
- Lars Bethke – Uffe Bratt (autumn 2007 – spring 2008)
- Christian Wennberg – Andreas J:son Holm (spring 2008)
- Kim Anderzon – Monica Nilsson (spring 2008)
- Björn Gustafson – Jonathan Wallenius (some episodes during spring 2008 and 2009)
- Erik Bolin – Jerry Dolke (some episodes during autumn 2008 and the last two episodes during season 2)
- Jill Ung – Anna-Lena Lagerlöf Oscarsson (autumn 2008 – spring 2009, spring 2010)
- Niklas Grusell – Thore Lagerlöf Oscarsson (some episodes during spring 2009)
- Ida Linnertorp – Nathalie Andersson-Offerdahl (two episodes during spring 2009, some episodes during spring 2010)
- Lars Magnus Larsson – Ingmar (six episodes during spring 2009 + one episode during autumn 2009)
- Bengt Bauler – Kenneth Beltroos (one episode autumn 2009)
- Fredrik Nilsson – The Bishop (some episodes during season 3)
- Wallis Grahn – Dagny Karlsson (Christmas and New Years Eves episodes during season 3)
- Ebba Wickman – Texas/Madeleine (one episode autumn 2009 and the last two episodes during season 3)
- Anna Ulrika Ericsson – Ursula Storrylinen (spring 2010)
- Stig Engström – doctor Hejnum (some episodes during spring 2010)
- Jamil Drissi – Vasil Drapeza (two episodes during spring 2010)
- Kristian Lima de Faria – Måns Dahlhem (one episode during spring 2010)
- Stig Strandberg – Janitor, teacher (Appearing as an extra in an episode 2008 and in 2010)

=== "Riverside" characters ===
These were the web series characters during autumn 2009. Riverside were only broadcast in one series. After that, it was cancelled.

- Jonas Bane – Kim Dahlberg
- Ida Linnertorp – Nathalie Andersson-Offerdahl
- Shvan Aladin – Ben-Ali Chehab
- Madeleine Martin – Cleopatra "Cleo" Lindström
- Anton Gyllensten – Patrik Boström
- Frida Bagri – Nilla Boström
- Jonas Sundh – Måns Wetterström
- Anette Sevreus – Eva-Lotta Boström
- Fredrik Dolk – Göran Offerdahl
- Stig Strandberg – Doctor in hospital (Appearing as an extra)

== Sources ==
- Andra Avenyn's homepage
- Riverside's homepage
