= Vita lögner =

Swedish television soap opera

- Country of origin: Sweden
- Original language: Swedish

Original release
- Network: TV3
- Release: 26 October 1997 – 2000

Vita lögner is a Swedish soap opera that was broadcast on TV3, from 1997 to 2002. The plot focused on the social life of the hospital staff and families in the fictional town of Strömsvik. Vita lögner was TV3's first big soap opera hit after Kanal5 bought Vänner och fiender from them in 1997. Many big stars in Sweden have performed roles on the show, among them Alexander Skarsgård, Petra Hultgren, Anna Järphammar, Maud Adams, and Per Morberg. Charlotte Perrelli (then Nilsson) had a bigger role as Milla Svensson, during 1997–1998.

== Cast and characters ==
- Rune Sandlund as Göran Fridell (1997–2001)
- Pia Green as Ingrid Fridell (1997–2001)
- Petra Hultgren as Annika Fridell (1997–1999)
- Eric Rydman as Patrik Fridell (1997–1999)
- Måns Nathanaelson as Jan Stipanek (1999–2001)
- Johan Gry as Anders Ståhlberg (1997–1998)
- Christina Hagman as Linda Åkesson (1997–1998)
- Jeanette Holmgren as Gunilla Persson (1997–2000)
- Per Morberg as Roger Rönn (1997–1999)
- Cajsalisa Ejemyr as Tessan Almgren (1997–1999)
- Ulf Dohlsten as Hasse Persson (1997–2001)
- Anna Järphammar as Mikaela Malm (1997–2001)
- Lena B Nilsson as Elsa Gren (1997–1999)
- Hanna Alström as Magdalena Gren (1997–1998)
- Jesper Salén as Jonas Persson (1997–1998)
- Isabel Munshi as Sophia Ekberg (1997–2000)
- Staffan Kihlbom as Felix Södergren (1997)
- Ann-Sofie Olofsson as Sara Lindefors (1998–2001)
- Anton Körberg as Adam Frick (1998–2001)
- Mikael Ahlberg as Mårten Rudberg (1999–2000)
- Karin Bergquist as Emma Rudberg (1999–2000)
- Emma Peters as Alexandra Brink (1999–2000)
- Erik Ståhlberg as Peter Lundholm (1999–2001)
- Alexander Skarsgård as Marcus Englund (1999)
- Jesper Eriksson as Henrik Ståhlberg (1999–2000)
- Petronella Wester as Eva Holm (2000–2001)
- Niclas Wahlgren as Stefan Jensen (2000–2001)
- Cecilia Bergqvist as Helena Thorén (2000–2001)
- Victoria Brattström as Klara Gabrielsson (2000–2001)
- Vanessa Svanergren as Stella (2001)
- Lars Bethke as Tomas Fredriksson (2000–2001)
- Moa Gammel as Julia Wallgren (2000–2001)
- Jarmo Mäkinen as Piru (1999–2000)
- Julio Cesar Soler Baró as Francisco "Paco" Rios (2001)
- Richard Ulfsäter as Ola Lind (2000)
- Pär Berglund as Kryckman
