= Detour (2009 Norwegian film) =

- Film poster
- Norwegian: Snarveien
- Directed by: Severin Eskeland
- Written by: Severin Eskeland
- Produced by: Bjørn Eivind Aarskog
- Starring: Marte Germaine Christensen; Sondre Krogtoft Larsen
- Cinematography: Bjørn Eivind Aarskog
- Edited by: Erik Thorvald Aster
- Music by: Stein Berge Svendsen
- Production company: Exposed Film Productions
- Distributed by: Svensk Filmindustri SF
- Release date: 31 July 2009
- Running time: 77 minutes
- Country: Norway
- Language: Norwegian

Detour is a 2009 Norwegian horror/thriller film written and directed by Severin Eskeland, starring Marte Germaine Christensen and Sondre Krogtoft Larsen.

== Plot ==
When a Norwegian couple are instructed by a policeman to take a detour through the Swedish forests, a series of strange and horrifying events follow.

== Cast ==
- Marte Germaine as Lina
- Sondre Krogtoft Larsen as Martin
- Jens Hultén as Gunnar
- Johan Hedenberg as Bosse
- Malin King as Lotta
- Inga Didong Harrie as Ellinor
- Jeppe Beck Laursen as Lasse
- Knut Walle as Edgar
- Mikkel Gaup as Smugler
- Kai Kolstad Rødseth as Maskemannen

== Reviews ==
In the Norwegian press, the film got "die throws" of 4 in VG, in Dagsavisen, in Aftenposten, in Bergens Tidende and in Romerikes Blad; 3 in Dagbladet, in Stavanger Aftenblad, in Fædrelandsvennen and in iTromsø; and 2 in Klassekampen and in Adresseavisen. Filming took place in Finnskogen and the film premiered in Elverum, Hamar and Kongsvinger before everywhere else. In other newspapers, the film received "die throws" of 4 in Hamar Arbeiderblad in Glåmdalen and in Østlendingen.
