= Johan Hedenberg =

Swedish actor

- Born: 9 October 1954 (age 71); Maria Magdalena parish, Stockholm, Sweden
- Occupations: Actor, director, screenwriter
- Years active: 1980–present

Leif Johan Gunnar Hedenberg (born 9 October 1954) is a Swedish actor, director, and screenwriter.

== Early life and education ==
Leif Johan Gunnar Hedenberg was born on 9 October 1954 in Maria Magdalena parish in Stockholm, Sweden, the son of actors Ulla-Britt and Leif Hedenberg, and grew up in the suburb of Bromma. Johan was beaten regularly by his father as a child, until he fought back as a teen and gave him a beating, after which his father never touched him again. Their relationship became frosty for some time after that, before thawing somewhat.

In 1978 he began studying at the Malmö Theatre Academy in Malmö, in southern Sweden, graduating in 1981.

== Career ==
=== Acting ===
After graduating, he started working as an actor with the Royal Dramatic Theatre in Stockholm. During that time, he spent much time in the company of Thorsten Flinck and Paolo Roberto, and also others who were bad for him, including criminals. He gave up his job at the theatre in anger after a fight, which he later regretted.

He soon found work in various TV series, and at the end of the 1980s found work in the emerging business of voice acting. With the introduction of commercial television in Sweden, animated shows on TV became more common and Hedenberg found steady work as a voice actor. As a voice actor, Hedenberg became a popular choice to cast as villains because of his deep voice, including Dr. Julian Robotnik, Prolix, The Shredder, Dr. Drakken, and Dick Dastardly.

He acted in the stage premiere of Magnus Dahlström's acclaimed play Skärbrännaren (1987), which was made into a television version the following year.

In 1988, he became widely known for his role as a "baddy" in the TV drama series Varuhuset.

During the 2000s and 2010s he provided the Swedish voice for several famous cartoon villains Captain Haddock in The Adventures of Tintin: The Secret of the Unicorn (2011; dir: Steven Spielberg) and Django in Ratatouille (2007; dir. Brad Bird).

=== Screenwriting ===
Hedenberg wrote the screenplay for the 1990 film Tolv vill hem, which he also directed and produced, and Badhuset, released in 1989.

== Other activities ==
Hedenberg was a member of the rock music band Rökrock, and has appeared on television as a trotting expert.

== Personal life ==
Hedenberg was married, and has two daughters. After divorcing, he dated actress Sanna Ekman for some time.

In 2012, he survived an operation to remove a tumour from his heart which was at high risk at spreading. He later said that the incident had given him new a perspective on life. In the same year, he published an autobiography titled Lill-Tarzan å jag.

== Filmography ==
- 1980 – Sverige åt svenskarna as Messenger
- 1984 – Två solkiga blondiner as Glenn the parashooter
- 1985 – Åshöjdens BK as Edward
- 1986 – På liv och död as Peter
- 1988 – Varuhuset as Jonas (a villain)
- 1989 – The Super Mario Bros. Super Show! as Swedish voice of Luigi
- 1989 – Asterix and the Big Fight as Swedish voice of Prolix
- 1990 – Teenage Mutant Ninja Turtles as Swedish-language voice of Donatello and General Traag in the Media Dubb version
- 1992 – Dastardly and Muttley in Their Flying Machines as Swedish voice of Dick Dastardly
- 1992 – Porco Rosso as various Swedish background voices
- 1993 – Morsarvet as Captain Antonsson
- 1993 – Sonic the Hedgehog as Swedish voice of Robotnik
- 1993 – Adventures of Sonic the Hedgehog as Swedish voice of Dr. Robotnik
- 1993 – Swat Kats as Swedish voice of T-Bone
- 1993 – Biker Mice from Mars as Swedish voice of Throttle
- 1993 – Rocko's Modern Life as Swedish voice of Heffer and Mrs. Bighead
- 1994 – Mighty Morphin Power Rangers as Swedish voice of Bulk
- 1994 – Life with Louie as Swedish voice of Andrew "Andy" Anderson
- 1996 – Nattbuss 807 as Police Officer Johan
- 1997 – Disney's Hercules as Swedish voice of Nessus the Centaur, also the Narrator
- 1998 – Beck – Monstret as The Limousin Man
- 1998 – The Lion King II: Simba's Pride as Swedish voice of Scar (replacing Rikard Wolff from the first movie)
- 1999 – Skilda världar as Morgan Engström
- 1999 – Courage the Cowardly Dog as various Swedish voices, like Freaky Fred
- 2001 – Harry Potter and the Philosopher's Stone as Swedish voice of Lord Voldemort
- 2002–2007 – Kim Possible as Swedish voice of Dr. Drakken
- 2003 – Hem till Midgård as The Ship Mechanic
- 2005 – Teenage Mutant Ninja Turtles as Swedish voice of Shredder
- 2006 – Poliser as Rolf
- 2008 – Kungamordet as Björn Larsson
- 2008 – Rallybrudar as Sven
- 2009 – Detour as Bosse
- 2009 – Het Huis Anubis as Swedish voice of Victor
- 2010 – Kommissarie Späck as Grünwald Karlsson
- 2010 – How to Train Your Dragon as Swedish voice of Stoick the Vast
- 2011 – Beyond the Border as Major Adolfsson
- 2011 – The Adventures of Tintin: The Secret of the Unicorn as Swedish voice of Captain Haddock
- 2013 – Wallander – Saknaden as Herltiz
- 2013 – The Death of a Pilgrim as Berg Jr.
- 2013 – The Bridge (TV series) as Axel Mössberg
- 2013 – Real Humans as The Police
- 2014 – The Lego Movie
- 2014−23 – Morden i Sandhamn (The Sandhamn Murders; TV series) as Olle Granlund (Seasons 4, 6, 8–9)
- 2015 – Blå Ögon as Johan Landin
- 2017 – The Lego Batman Movie
- 2018 – Ted – För kärlekens skull
- 2018 – Palmegruppen tar långlunch
- 2019 – The Perfect Patient
- 2022 – Fiktiv granskning – en grävande historia
- 2025 – The Glass Dome (Glaskupan) as retired police commissioner Valter Ness
