= Filip Benko =

Swedish actor

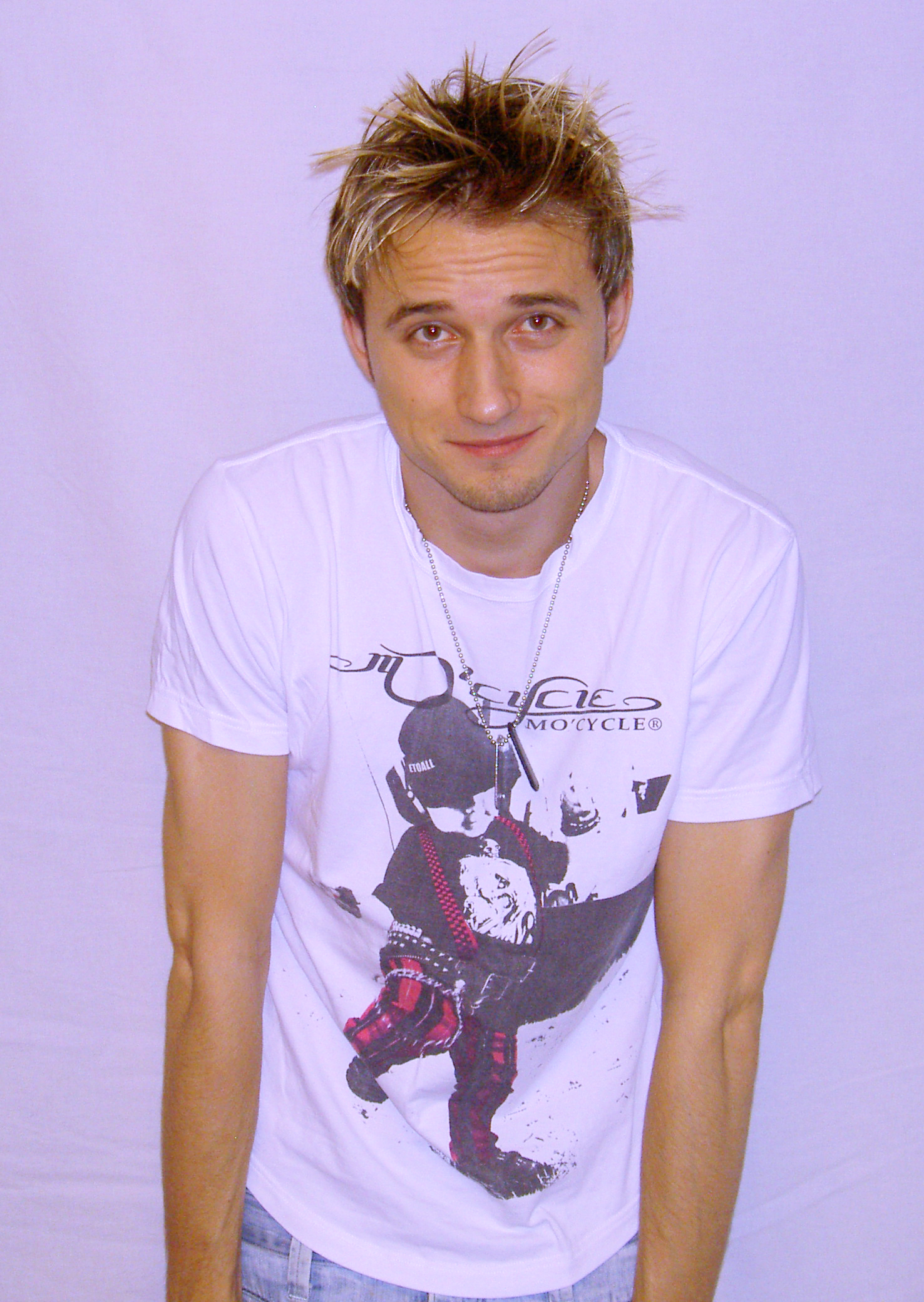
- Born: Filip Anton Benko; 4 March 1986 (age 39); Huddinge, Stockholm, Sweden
- Occupation: Actor
- Years active: 2004–present

Filip Benko (born 4 March 1986) is a Swedish actor of Croatian descent. While Benko studied at upper secondary technical school he recorded his first feature movie in 2004, Sandor slash Ida based on the novel with the same name by Sara Kadefors, he portrayed the part of Sandors older brother, Aron.

After his first movie Benko filmed a variety of short movies until the director Ivica Zubak cast him as the lead in his first motion picture, Knäcka. Soon after, Benko was cast as the character Markus Niklasson in the TV-show Andra Avenyn.

Benko studied computer science at Royal Institute of Technology 2004-2008 and speaks Swedish, English and Serbo-Croatian fluently and speaks German intermediately.

== Filmography ==
- Sandor slash Ida - Aron (2004)
- Drowning Ghost - Student (2004)
- Livet enligt Rosa - Tompa (2005)
- La-la-land - Eric (2007)
- Vildsvinet - Arvid (2007)
- Andra Avenyn - Marcus (2008)
- Knäcka - Goran (2009)

== Nominees and awards ==
- Aftonbladets TV-pris - Nominated - Best male actor 2008
- Cosmopolitan Sweden - #2 of "Swedish top 10 sexiest males 2010"
