= Jonas Bane =

Swedish actor (born 1987)

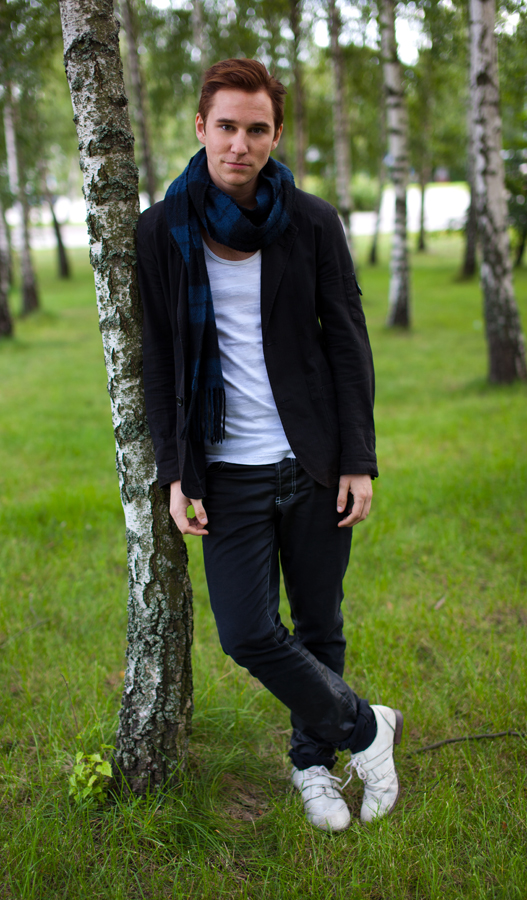
- Born: 14 September 1987 (age 38); Sollentuna, Sweden
- Occupation: Actor

Jonas Bane (born 14 September 1987) is a Swedish actor who first appeared on TV (in 2007) as the 16-year-old Kim Dahlberg in Sveriges Television (SVT) drama series Andra Avenyn.

== Biography ==
Bane grew up in Sollentuna, in the northern part of Stockholm. At high school he studied music, among other things, playing piano, bass guitar and "a little of the drums". He played bass in – and was "chief style consultant" in a band and appeared on local TV in Sollentuna. His stage debut was at the Oscarsteatern in Stockholm in March 2007. He was part of a 50 strong ensemble specially assembled for a new Swedish musical called 1956. The ensemble was called Danubia and the music was provided by Stockholms Rocksinfonietta which was also formed specially for this production. Much influenced by Les Misérables, 1956 linked the Hungarian Uprising of 1956 with the demonstrations in Gothenburg in 2001 against President George W. Bush and American foreign policy. The heroine discovers that her father had killed a demonstrator in Hungary in 1956.

In 2007, Bane applied to audition for one of the teenager roles in Andra Avenyn, a lavish Swedish TV soap opera set in Gothenburg. He was one of the forty chosen to participate in a Pop Idol/American Idol style mini-series to be filmed and broadcast. He thus landed the role of Kim Dahlberg, a troubled, bi-sexual youngster. In an interview during the auditions, Bane indicated that he was determined to make acting his career. In 2008 he was nominated "Årets HBT-fast-inte-på-riktigt" (The not-really-gay personality of the year) by QX magazine. In December 2008, he suffered an unprovoked, physical assault at a student dance/gathering, where he was appearing as a favour to a girl friend.

== Filmography ==
- 2007 – Andra Avenyn (TV soap)
- 2008 – "Havreflarn" (short film)
- 2018 – Ted – För kärlekens skull

== Theatre ==
- 2007 – 1956 (musical)
- 2007 – Järn (radio play)
