= Anna Järphammar =

Swedish model, actress and TV host

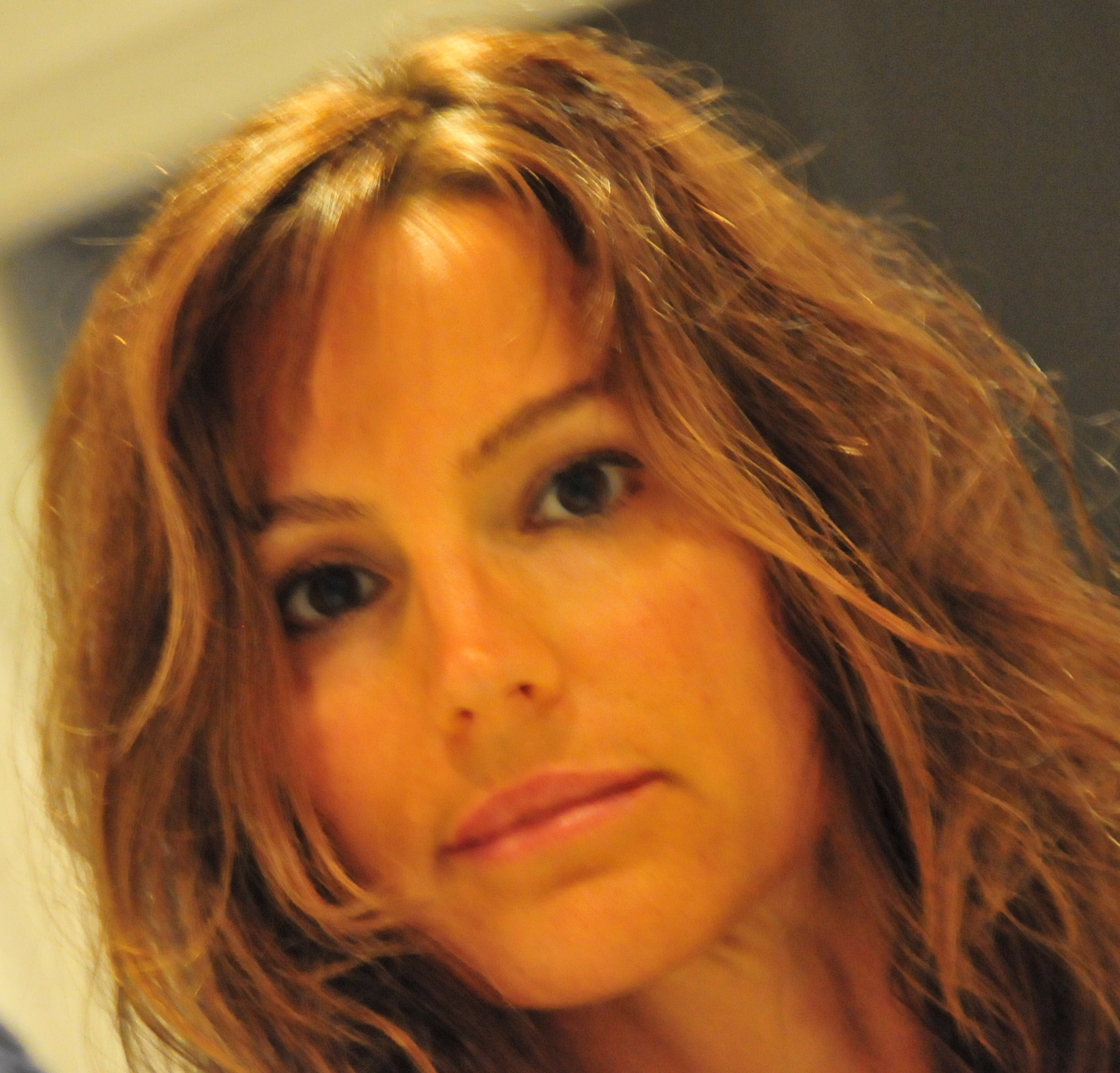
- Anna Järphammar in 2009
- Born: Anna Camile Järphammar; 13 January 1968 (age 58)
- Occupations: Model, actress, television host

Anna Camile Järphammar (born 13 January 1968) is a Swedish model, actress and TV host. She was initially made famous when she modeled for the furniture and home products giant IKEA in the mid-1990s (with exposed buttocks).

After presenting game shows and other entertainment shows on TV3 she starred as a leading character, Mikaela Malm, in the soap opera Vita lögner. In 2005, she became anchor for TV3 and its short news program "Update" (through 2007).
