= Lasse Petterson =

Swedish actor (1935–2019)

Lasse Petterson (born Lars Anders Pettersson; 8 April 1935 in Östersund – 30 March 2019) was a Swedish actor.

== Filmography ==
=== Film ===
- 91:an Karlsson muckar (tror han) (1959)
- Barna från Blåsjöfjället (1980)
- Höjdhoppar'n (1981)
- Råttornas vinter (1988)
- Roseanna (1993)
- Sommaren (1995)
- En liten julsaga (1999)
- Om inte (2001)
- Grabben i graven bredvid (2002)
- As It Is in Heaven (2004)
- One Step Behind (2005)

=== Television ===
- Kråsnålen (1988)
- Den vite riddaren (1994)
