= En liten julsaga =

- Directed by: Åsa Sjöström; Mari Marten-Bias Wahlgren
- Written by: Åsa Sjöström; Mari Marten-Bias Wahlgren
- Produced by: Peter Holthausen
- Distributed by: FilmHaus/Casa Nova Lagnö AB
- Release date: 1999
- Running time: 58 minutes
- Country: Sweden
- Language: Swedish

En liten julsaga ("A Little Christmas story") is a 1999 Swedish children's film directed by Åsa Sjöström and Mari Marten-Bias Wahlgren.

== Plot ==
Ina loses her loved teddy bear Nonno in the Metro after Christmas-shopping with her mum. An old man and his dog find Nonno and leave him at the post but he falls into a bag which ends up going to Kiruna by train, where Anna who works at the post at the station finds him and brings him home.

Later, a boy called Per-Olof finds Nonno who has disappeared from Anna's family. When two girls tease him for the teddy bear, he becomes angry and throws Nonno down on the motorway and Nonno lands on a truck going towards Stockholm. Later, Nonno is for sale in an antique shop and Ina's older half-brother Jakob, who later comes back home from the United States, passes the shop and buys Nonno.

== Cast ==
- Lisa Malmborg as Ina
- Gunilla Röör as Isabella, Ina's mother
- Thomas Hedengran as Ina's father
- Jesper Salén as Jakob
- Lasse Petterson as Old man with dog who finds Nonno at the Metro
- Pia Johansson as Woman who works at the post in Kiruna

== See also ==
- List of Christmas films
