= Görel Crona =

Swedish director

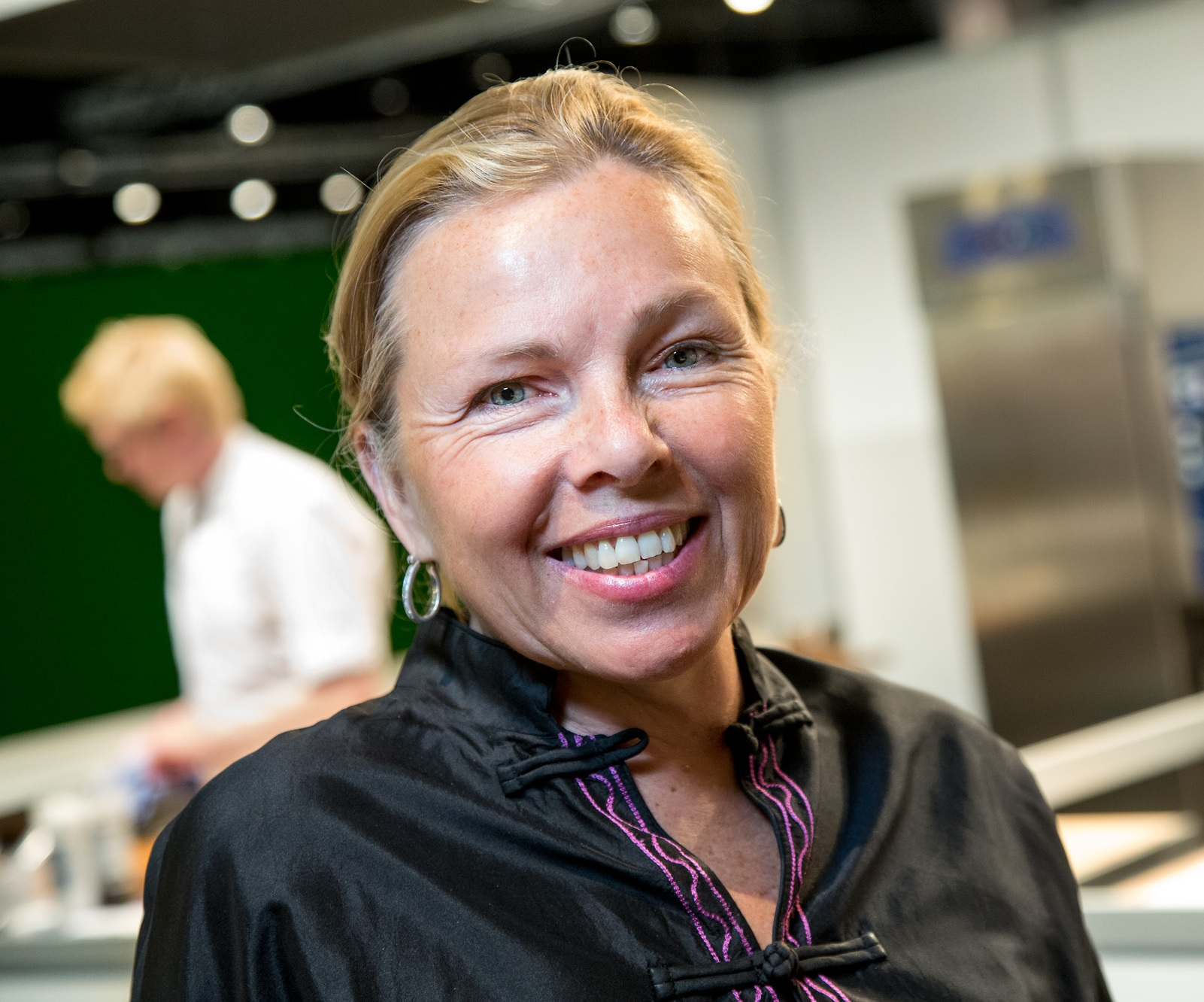
- Crona in 2014.
- Born: Görel Elisabeth Crona; 23 August 1959 (age 66); Stockholm, Sweden
- Occupations: Actress, film director, Singer/Songwriter
- Years active: 1978–present
- Spouse: Rafael Edholm (m. 1997–2006) Present: Henrik Von Koch (m. 2012)
- Children: 1

Görel Elisabeth Crona (born 23 August 1959) is a Swedish film director, actress and singer/songwriter. She had her first role in the Sveriges Television series Varuhuset.

== Life ==
Crona is the daughter of Swedish author and jazz musician Börje Crona and author Anniki Crona. She grew up in Las Palmas in the Canary Islands and moved back to Sweden to attend college and study at the Birkagårdens folkhögskolas theater-line. In 1978, she received her first major lead in the theater role of Eleonora in August Strindberg's drama Easter at the Strindbergsmuseet.

After this role Crona earned her living as a nightclub singer in Sorrento, Italy. In 1980, Görel Crona was admitted into the two-year theater education in New York City at SUNY Purchase. After that Crona continued her studies at HB (Herbert Berghof) Studio. In 1983, she returned to Sweden and Stockholm where she worked at the Reginateaterns English-language works and at Pocketteatern and Parkteatern. Her big breakthrough was in the SVT television series Varuhuset where she played the ex-prostitute "Ylva" between 1987 and 1988. Other roles include Birgitta Stenberg's alter-ego in the television-movie Apelsinmannen in 1983, the tough policewoman in the television series Anna Holt on TV4 in 1996 and also a role in the series Nya tider between 2002 and 2003. In 2013, Görel Crona made her film director's debut with the film Tysta leken.

== Family ==
Crona was in a relationship with actor Rafael Edholm whom she met in 1995; the couple split in 2006. The couple has one son together.

== Selected filmography ==
- The Department Store (Swedish: Varuhuset, 1987–1989) TV series
- House of Angels (Swedish: Änglagård, 1992)
- White Water Fury (Swedish: Järngänget, 2000)
- Göta Canal 2 – Canal Battle (Swedish: Göta kanal 2 – Kanalkampen, 2006)
