= Petra Hultgren =

Swedish actress (born 1972)

Petra Cecilia Alexandra Hultgren (born 21 April 1972 in Värmdö, Stockholm County) is a Swedish actress and beauty pageant titleholder.

She was crowned as Miss Sweden in 1995 and won the Miss Photogenic award at Miss Universe 1995.

Hultgren starred in the Swedish series Andra Avenyn. She is known now as Petra van de Voort.

== Series ==
- 1996 - Vänner och fiender Friends and enemies
- 1998 - Vita lögner White lies
- 2006 - Mäklarna The Agents
- 2008 - Andra Avenyn Second Avenue

== Appearances in films ==
- 2001 - No joke city
- 2002 - Blueprint
- 2004 - Det nya livet The new life
- 2004 - Skyddsängeln The Guardian
- 2004 - Is this love?
- 2005 - Wallander: Afrikanen Wallander: The African
- 2006 - Att göra en pudel To make a poodle
- 2009 - SOKO Wismar : Das dritte Feuer
