= Mohamed Said (actor) =

Swedish actor (1987–2024)

Mohamed Said (12 May 1987 – 11 January 2024) was a Swedish actor. He lived in Huddinge Stockholm. He had a walk-on in Daniel Fridell's full-length film Säg att du älskar mig (Say that you love me) in 2006. He took part in Borta bra, a short film. He was known for his role in Swedish Television's drama series Andra Avenyn.

Said's parents were Iraqi. He died on 11 January 2024, at the age of 36.

== Filmography ==
- Säg att du älskar mig, (in Swedish) 2006 (Walker-on)
- Andra Avenyn (TV series), 2007
- Borta Bra, 2007

== Sources ==
- "Swedish Television site for Mohamed Said". Archived from the original on 19 April 2008.
