= Fortesa Hoti =

Albanian-Swedish actress

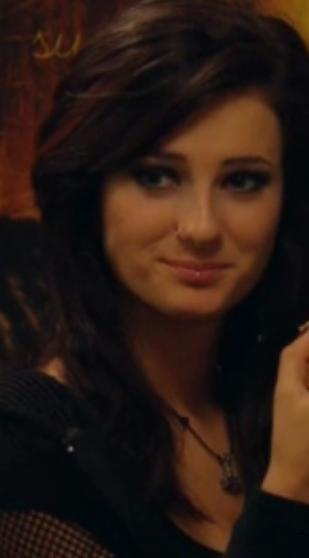
Fortesa Hoti

Fortesa Hoti (born 6 December 1988 in Polac village Skenderaj, Kosovo) is an Albanian-Swedish actress. She is best known for her role as Roxana Nilsson in the Swedish Television SVT's drama series Andra Avenyn (2007). She was one of the winners of SVT's broadcast competition for the teenagers' roles. She skipped the last year of school to take up the role, but hopes to go back to education later on. She was nominated as best female actor both for 2007 and 2008 by the newspaper Aftonbladet.

She arrived in Sweden with her family in 1992 and now lives in Gothenburg. In June 2009 Fortesa began the filming of the movie Orion which was released in 2010.

== Biography ==
Hoti was born in Kosovo, to Albanian parents of the Hoti tribe in 1988, which she was forced to leave due to the war. She came to Sweden when she was just three years old. She rose to fame thanks to her role as Roxana Nilsson in the TV series Andra Avenyn. She used emotional recall of her traumatic experiences, including the flight from Kosovo with her family, when acting as Roxana. In 2010 she acted as Anna in the movie Orion.

== Filmography ==
- 2007 – Andra Avenyn
- 2007 - Ciao Bella as an extra
- 2010 - Orion as Anna

== Sources ==
- "Swedish Television site for Fortesa Hoti". Archived from the original on April 19, 2008.
- "Interview in Swedish with Fortesa Hoti". Archived from the original on July 25, 2011.
- "The movie Orion".
