= Jonas Wolcher =

Swedish director and producer (born 1973)

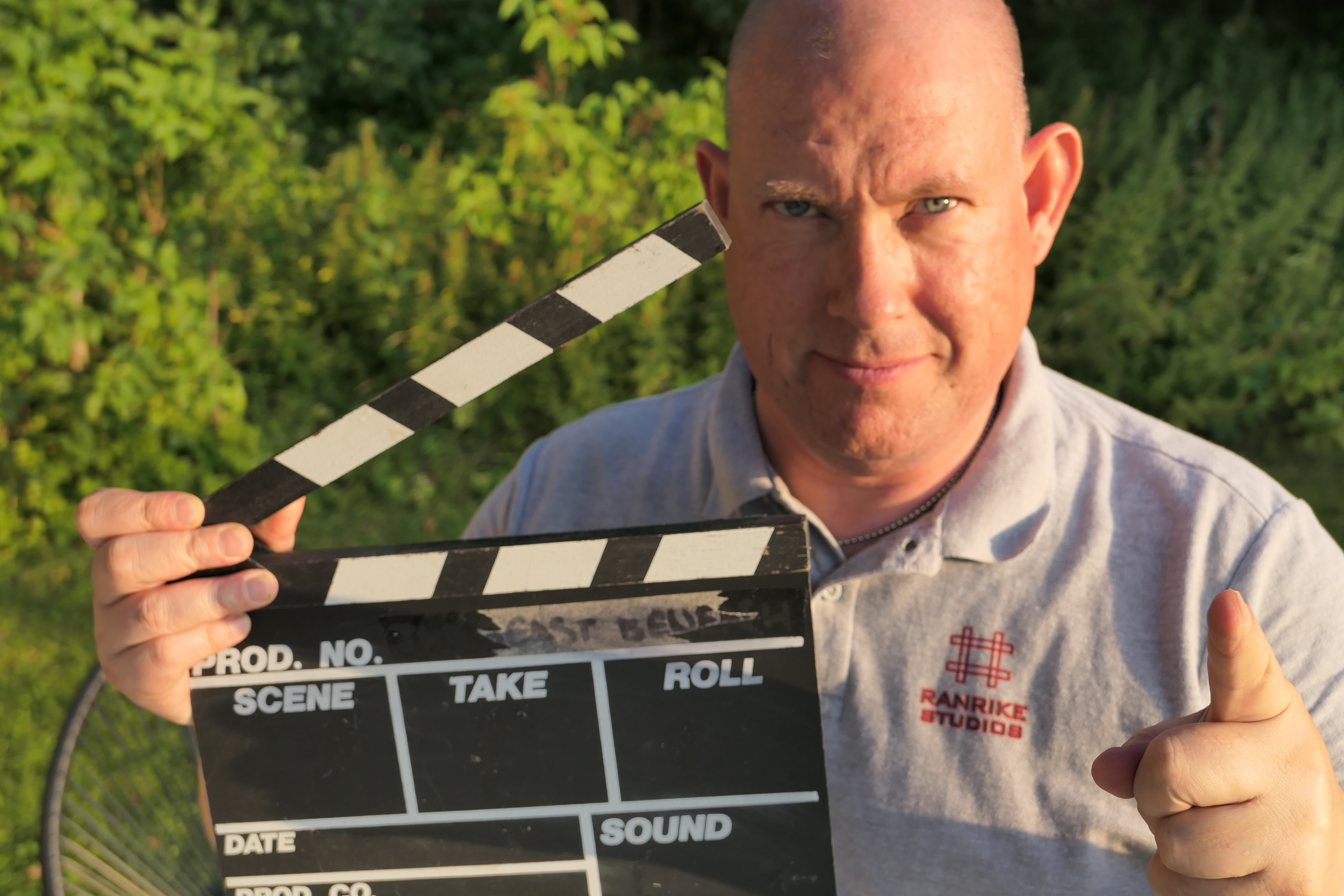

Jonas Wolcher (born April 15, 1973) is a Swedish director and producer best known for Die Zombiejäger, Dragonetti: The Ruthless Contract Killer and Cannibal Fog.

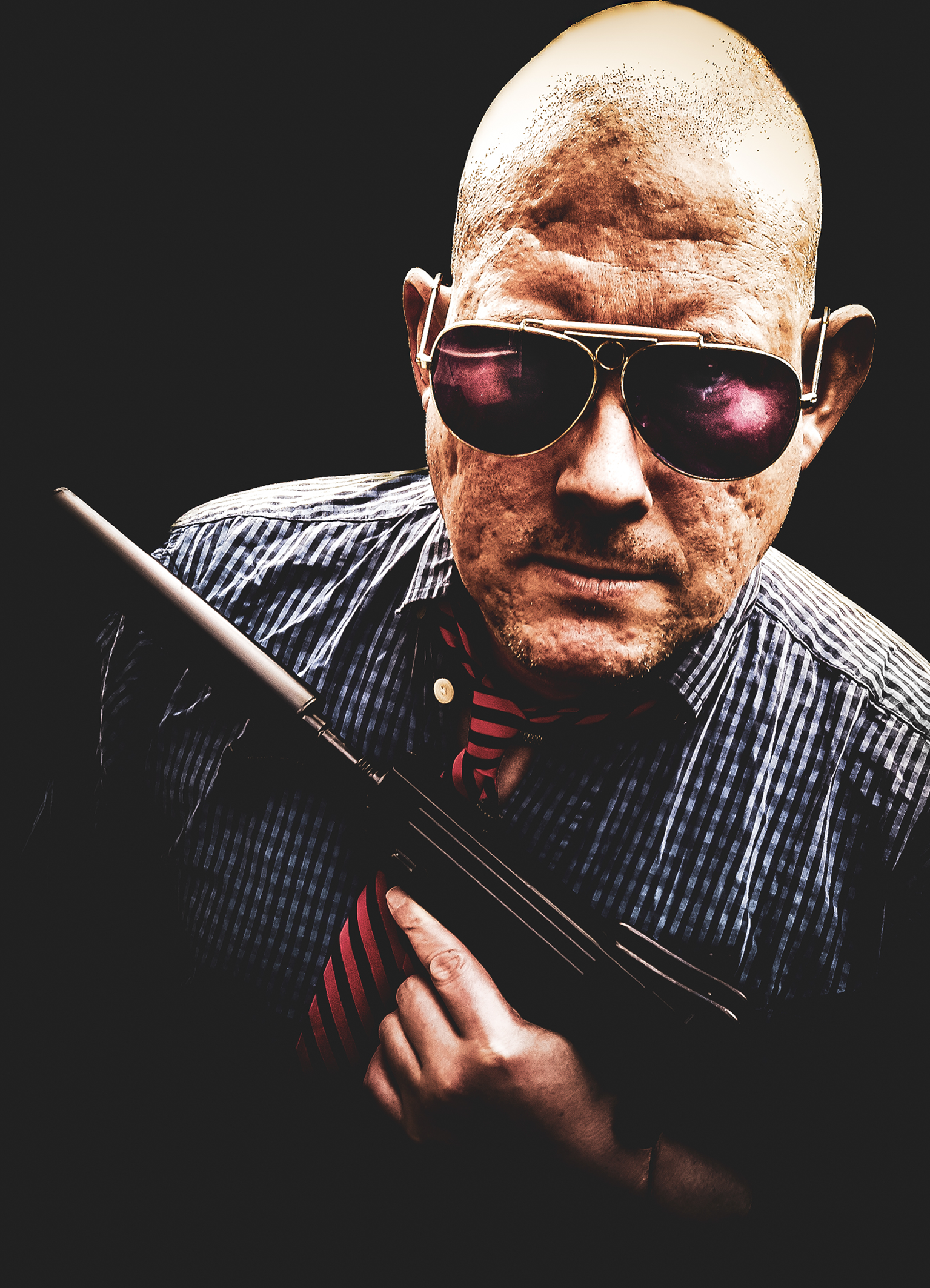

== Cannibal Fog ==
In 2014, Wolcher released Cannibal Fog, an art house horror film. The film was well received. Critic Karen Oughton declared the film to be "a finely mixed, jangling masterpiece of humanity masquerading as merry mayhem."
