= Jenny Ulving =

Swedish actress

- Born: September 26, 1979 (age 46); Östersund, Sweden
- Occupation: Actress
- Years active: 1996–present

Jenny Ulving (born September 26, 1979, in Östersund) is a Swedish film and television actress. She started her career with the role of Bella in the soap opera Vänner och fiender (Friends and Foes) which was broadcast on Kanal 5.

== Films ==
- Glömskans brev (2004)
- Strandvaskaren (2004)
- Den Osynlige (2002)
- Dubbel-åttan (2000)

== TV series ==
- Vänner och fiender (1996–1999)
