= Mats Wahl =

Swedish author (1945–2025)

- Born: 10 May 1945; Malmö, Sweden
- Died: 14 August 2025 (aged 80)
- Occupation: Writer
- Writing career
- Language: Swedish
- Years active: 1978–2025

Mats Wahl (10 May 1945 – 14 August 2025) was a Swedish author. He published 43 books but also wrote several plays for the theatre, television programs, novels and film. Vinterviken (in English: the Winter bay) is one of his most famous books, which is also a film. Wahl died on 14 August 2025, at the age of 80.

== Bibliography ==
- På spaning efter växandets punkt
- Konsten att undervisa
- Honungsdrömmen
- Hallonörnen
- Vinterfågel
- Förståelse och handling
- Guntzborg Jöntzon
- Norrpada
- Döläge
- Ungdomspedagogik
- Halva sanningen
- Havsörnsvalsen
- Hat
- Jiggen
- Husbonden
- Utbildning och klass
- Mannen som älskade kvinnor
- Den lackerade apan
- Anna-Carolinas krig
- Skrinet
- Jac Uppmuntraren
- Play it again
- Sjöbo
- Maj Darlin
- Kärlek i september
- Sagan om den lilla kråkodillen
- Därvarns resa
- Nåra riktigt fina dar
- Vinterviken
- Vildmarksfiskaren
- I ballong över Stilla havet
- Lilla Marie
- Nu seglar Vasa
- Emma och Daniel: Mötet
- De övergivna
- 3 Pjäser
- Den långa resan (with Sven Nordqvist)
- 1998 – Emma och Daniel: Kärleken
- 1998 – Emma och Daniel: Resan
- John-John
- Folket i Birka på vikingarnas tid
- 1999 – Maj Darlin
- Den osynlige
- Halva sanningen
- Såpa
- Tjafs
- Kill
- Svenska för idioter
- Återkomst
- 2006 – Den vilda drömmen
- 2008 – När det kommer en älskare

== Awards ==
- Nils Holgersson-plaketten for the book Maj Darlin
- Nordiske Börnebogspriset
- Augustpriset for the book Vinterviken
- ABF:s litteraturpris
- Janusz Korczak-priset
- Deutscher Jugendliteraturpreis for Vinterviken
- Kulturpriset Till Adam Brombergs minne (Adamspriset)
