= The Invisible (2002 film) =

2002 Swedish thriller film

- DVD cover
- Swedish: Den osynlige
- Directed by: Joel Bergvall; Simon Sandquist
- Based on: Den Osynlige by Mats Wahl
- Starring: Gustaf Skarsgård
- Production companies: Film i Vast, Nordisk Film Production, SF Bio
- Release date: February 8, 2002 (Sweden)
- Running time: 1h 41min
- Country: Sweden
- Language: Swedish

The Invisible (Swedish: Den osynlige) is a 2002 Swedish film directed by Joel Bergvall and Simon Sandquist, very loosely based on Mats Wahl's book of the same name. The film follows Niklas, a young and quiet man who falls short of his mother's expectations, and then finds himself attacked by a neglected young girl Annelie (she too, is metaphorically invisible) and left for dead. The next morning, however, he discovers that no one can see, hear or feel him, and anything he does to try and communicate is reversed; he is in a Limbo-like state between life-and-death, and must find out his 'murderer' and save his body before it's too late. The film stars Gustaf Skarsgård, Tuva Novotny and Thomas Hedengran in the leads.

The film was critically acclaimed, screened internationally, won multiple festival awards, and was later remade in the United States by Spyglass Entertainment and Disney. Released April 27, 2007, The Invisible (2007) was the first Hollywood adaptation of a Swedish feature since Intermezzo (1936) and started the modern wave of American remakes of Swedish films.

== Plot ==
Niklas (Gustaf Skarsgård) is a poet who wants to go to a school to further develop and perfect his talents, while his mother wants him to follow in his family's footsteps and become something completely different from his dreams. He plans his escape and buys a ticket out of town to go to a special school in England, which he's been saving up for by writing papers for students in the school.

His best friend is getting picked on by the school bully, Annelie (Tuva Novotny), a rather violent young girl who is often neglected. She gets caught stealing and comes to believe that Niklas snitched on her. Her gang beats up Niklas' friend until he lies and says that it was Niklas that told everyone, thinking that Niklas has already gone to England. The gang tracks down Niklas and nearly beats him to death. The next morning Niklas walks out of the forest without a scratch on his body and seems a little unnerved. When he gets to school, everyone is ignoring him and he can't figure out why. He realizes that he is invisible after he throws a book at the wall, and the book stays in its original spot. He can touch and move things, but the second he looks back, the object is back in place. The twist occurs when a bird dies by flying into a window, and Niklas recognizes that he is still alive, but dying in the woods. Annelie finds out that it was actually her boyfriend who snitched on her because she didn't want to give him his part of the stolen things.

Niklas is left helpless as he watches his mother and the police hunt for his body. His friend commits suicide over the event and leaves a letter for his parents and the police, who eventually find Niklas' body, which by this stage is lifeless and on the very edge of death. The film ends with Annelie admitting to the crime, turning herself over to the police and turning off Niklas' life support so that both are free.

== Cast ==
- Gustaf Skarsgård - Niklas
- Tuva Novotny - Annelie
- Li Brådhe - Kerstin
- Thomas Hedengran - Thomas Larsson
- David Hagman - Peter
- Pär Luttrop - Marcus
- Francisco Sobrado - Attis
- Joel Kinnaman - Kalle
- Jenny Ulving - Sussie
- Anna Hallström - Marie
- Catherine Hansson - Jeanette Tullgren
- Per Burell - Per Tullgren
- Gabriel Eriksson - Victor Tullgren
- Norman Zulu - Peters pappa
- Eivin Dahlgren - Rektorn
- Sara Lindh - Lärare
- Frederik Nilsson - Läkare
- Pontus Edmar - Polistekniker
- Pontus Hövelman - Jonas
- Robert Lindqvist - Ludwig
- Anders Claesson - Vapenhandlare
- Jonas Beijer - Vapenhandlare

== Awards ==
It received the 2002 Guldbagge Awards (Sweden) and Best Achievement Award for Production Design.
