= Sharon Dyall =

Swedish actress and singer (born 1962)

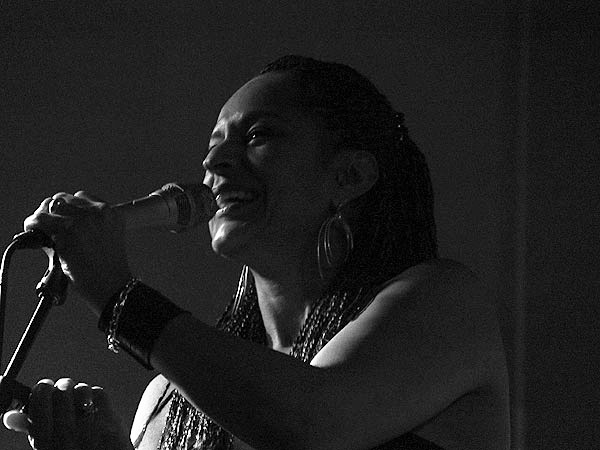
- Dyall performing in Denmark in 2017
- Born: Sharon Birgitta Dyall; 28 December 1962 (age 63); Danderyd, Sweden
- Occupations: Singer, actress

Sharon Birgitta Dyall (born 28 December 1962) is a Swedish singer, actress and voice actress. She became famous in the late 1980s when she acted in the SVT TV series Varuhuset. She has since become known as a singer of soul and jazz music and as a musical performer. She has appeared in many theatre productions including West Side Story (Chinateatern, 1989), A Chorus Line (National Swedish Touring Theatre, 1996), Nine (Malmö Opera, 2002) and Chicago (Stockholm City Theatre, 2014, 2015). Aside from being active on stage and within the field of dubbing, Dyall also holds a degree in Logonomy, Aesthetic Voice and Speech Pedagogy (University College of Music Education) teaching in Voice and Artistic Performance Development.

== Early life ==
Dyall was born in Sweden but grew up in London and Barbados. Her father was the jazz musician Colin Dyall. She learned how to play the piano and began dancing at the age of six. When the family moved to Sweden in the 1970s, she joined her father on tour as a backup singer. Her brother, Karl Dyall, is a Swedish dancer, singer and actor.

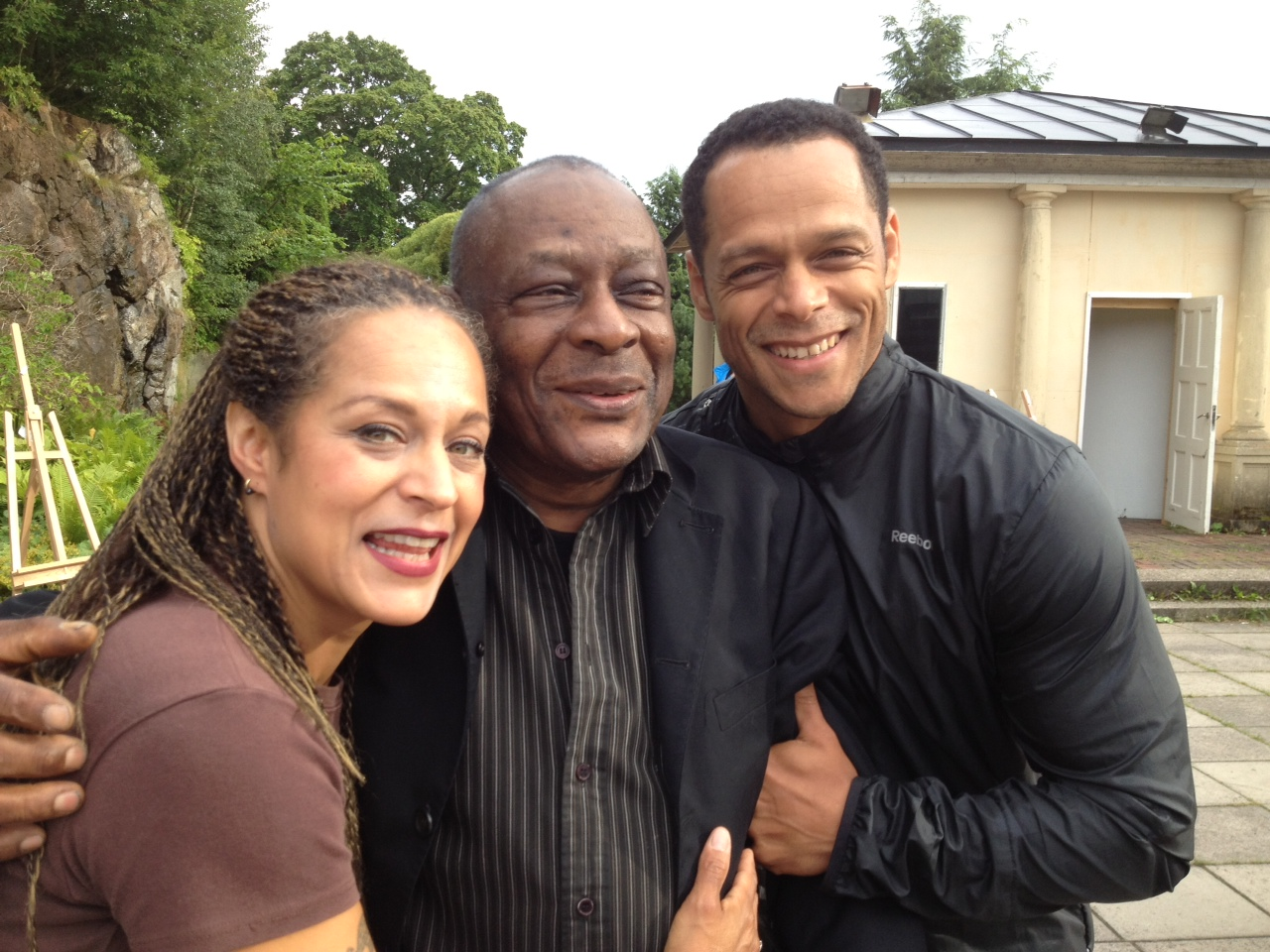
Dyall with her father Colin and brother Karl in 2013

== Career ==
In 1983, she became a member of the band Little Mike & The Sweet Soul Music Band along with band members Little Mike Watson, Nils Landgren, Anders Berglund, Claes af Geijerstam and Anna-Lotta Larsson.

In 1985, she released the solo album I Am and in 1988 she performed with the Swedish band Nasa. In the early 1990s she toured with Anne Linnet and Sanne Salomonsen. She did the show Vårsoul along with Tommy Nilsson at Hamburger Börs in 1997.

In 1984, she started her career as a musical singer; she appeared in the musicals West Side Story and Guys and Dolls at Stockholms Parkteater, and the musical SKÅL at Maximteatern. In 1989, she was awarded the Guldmasken award for "Best supporting actress in a musical" for her role as "Anita" in the musical West Side Story at Chinateatern. She also received acclaim for her roles in the musicals Hair (Chinateatern, 1991), A Chorus Line (National Swedish Touring Theatre, 1996), Jekyll & Hyde (Östgötateatern, 1999–2000) and Nine (Malmö Opera, 2002). In 2014, and 2015, she had the leading role in the musical Chicago at the Stockholm City Theatre. and acted in 8 Women at the same theatre in 2018.

Her big breakthrough in acting came in 1987 with her role as "Tina" in the SVT drama series Varuhuset. She has since appeared in several films and television series, among them Rosenbaum in 1993 and Kommissarie Winter in 2010. She competed in Melodifestivalen 1991 singing "Ge mig ett svar", finishing in fifth place overall. The same year she appeared in the revue Hjalmars hotell at Parkteatern. In 1993, she acted in the revue show Mulliga vitaminer along with Birgitta Andersson and Ulf Brunnberg at Lorensbergsteatern in Gothenburg.

Dyall has sung a lot of jazz along with bands such as Peter Asplund trio och Peter Asplund Big Band Show, Claes Crona Trio, Blue House Jazz Orchestra, Stockholms Jazz Orchestra, Mats Holmqvists Stora Stygga, Bohuslän Big Band, Sandviken Big Band and Norrbotten Big Band. In 2007 she released the jazz album Another Angle. She has also been a backup singer for singers such as Mauro Scocco, Lisa Nilsson, Eagle-Eye Cherry, Björn Skifs, Titiyo, Ola Magnell and Nils Landgren.

In her career as an actress and singer, she also works as a dubbing director at Sun Studio (SDI) and Dubberman studio. She has overseen the Swedish dubbing of films such as Ice Age and The Princess and the Frog and has also done a great deal of dubbing work herself, for instance she has often dubbed the voice of Helena Bonham Carter and is the long-standing character voice of Daphne in the Scooby-Doo Movies and Television series. In 2013, she wrote the Swedish translation for the lyrics of songs from the Disney film Frozen.

== Discography ==
- 1978: Modern Sound Corporation
- 1983–85: Little Mike & the Sweet Soul Music Band
- 1984–85: Nils Landgren & the Cosmic Beavers
- 1985: I Am
- 1991: Ge mig ett svar, contributions in Melodifestivalen
- 1996: For All We Know with Magnum Coltrane Price on Stora Stygga CD Standards
- 1996: Esmeraldas Bön, soundtrack of Disney's Ringaren i Notre Dame (English title The Hunchback of Notre Dame)
- 1997: Nu Är Du Min & Vad Skall Du Med Mig Till (Text/Music: Mauro Scocco)
- 2000: Våra Systrar gå i Brokiga Kläder, poems by Karin Boye
- 2001: Totta Näslund Duetter
- 2002: Andliga Klassiker, Björn Hedström
- 2004: Totta 7 Soul/På drift
- 2006–18: Christmas with My Friends (6 volumes) with Nils Landgren
- 2007: Another Angle, with Tommy Berndtsson
- 2016: Disney Rariteter, soundtracks from Disney films

== Audio books ==
- 2007: Tusen strålande solar of Khaled Hosseini (Bonnier Audio)
- 2008: Järngreppet of Aino Trosell (Norstedts)
- 2009: Tionde gåvan of Jane Johnson (Bonnier Audio)
- 2009: Ett ljus i mörkret of Agneta Sjödin (Bonnier Audio)
- 2010: Nattönskningen of Anne B Ragde (Bonnier Audio)
- 2013: Hatties Liv of Ayana Mathis (Earbooks)

== Filmography ==
- 1987 – Varuhuset (TV series)
- 1988 – Oliver & gänget (voice as Rita)
- 1991 – Rosenbaum, (TV series)
- 1991 – Kopplingen (TV series)
- 1996 – Ringaren i Notre Dame (film, 1996) (voice as Esmeralda)
- 1996 – Dragonball Z (TV series, 1996) (voice as Son Gohan)
- 1997 – Herkules (voice as Terpsichore)
- 1998 – Prinsen av Egypten (voice as Zipporah)
- 2000 – My Dog Skip (voice as Ellen)
- 2000 – Buzz Lightyear (voice as Mira Nova)
- 2000 – En extremt långbent film (voice as Sylvia Marpole)
- 2000 – Flykten från hönsgården (voice as Jenny)
- 2000 – Titan A.E. (voice as Stith)
- 2001 – E.T. the Extra-Terrestrial (voice as Mary)
- 2001 – Rasten (TV series, voice as Fröken Grotke)
- 2001 – Prop och Bertha (voice as Bertha)
- 2001 – Som hund och katt (voice as Ivy)
- 2002 – Country Bears (voice as Crystal)
- 2003 – A Christmas Carol (voice as Unga Clara)
- 2003 – Barbie i Svansjön (voice as Fågelprinsessan)
- 2003 – Ballerina/Småbusar (voice as Berättaren)
- 2003 – Dragon Ball Z (voice as Son Gohan)
- 2003 – Like Mike (voice as Janet)
- 2003 – Bionicle: Ljusets mask (voice as Turaga Nokama)
- 2003 – Peter Pan (voice as Mrs. Darling)
- 2004 – Gustaf (voice as Arlene)
- 2004 – Bionicle 2: Legenderna från Metru Nui (voice as Nokama)
- 2004 – Harry Potter och fången från Azkaban (voice as Den tjocka damen)
- 2005 – Zuper-Zebran (voice as Fia)
- 2005 – Bionicle 3: Nät av skuggor (voice as Nokama)
- 2005 – Valiant och de fjäderlätta hjältarna (voice as Victoria)
- 2005 – El Cid (voice)
- 2005 – Ben 10 (TV series) (voice)
- 2006 – Kalle i chokladfabriken (voice as Kalles mamma)
- 2007 – Harry Potter och Fenixorden (voice as Bellatrix Lestrange)
- 2007 – TMNT (voice as April O'Neil)
- 2007 – Animalia (TV series) (voice as Sarah, Sapi and Harmony-gris)
- 2008 – Madagaskar 2 (voice as Alexs mamma)
- 2008 – Våra vänner djuren (voice)
- 2010 – Alice i Underlandet (film)(voice as Röda Drottningen)
- 2010 – Kommissarie Winter (TV series)
- 2010 – My Little Pony: Vänskap är magisk
- 2011 – Scooby Doo! Mysteriegänget (TV series Voice as Daphne)
- 2010 – Det regnar köttbullar
- 2010 – Till vildingarnas land
- 2011 – Mästerkatten (voice as Imelda)
- 2011 – Jake och Piraterna i landet Ingenstans (TV series, voice as Röda Jessica)
- 2012 – Hotell Transylvanien (animated film)(Voice as Eunice)
- 2012 – De fem legenderna (animated film)
- 2012 – Violetta (TV Series) (Voice as Olga)
- 2014 – Länge leve Kung Julien (TV series) (voice as Xi-Xi and Masikura)
- 2015 – Hotell Transylvanien 2 (animated film)(Voice as Eunice)
- 2015 – Home (voice as Lucy Tucci)
- 2015 – Berättelsen om Askungen (voice as Gudmor)
- 2016 – Thunderbirds (voice as Överste Casey)
- 2016 – Zootropolis (voice as Instruktör)
- 2017 – Saknad (TV series)
- 2017 – Saltön (TV series)
- 2017 – The Emoji Movie (voice as Smajla)
- 2017 – Coco (voice as Tant Viktoria)
- 2017 – Stjärnan (film)(voice as Deborah)
- 2018 – Hodja och den flygande mattan (voice as Pärlsten)
- 2018 – Pelle Kanin (film)
- 2018 – Mästerdetektiven Sherlock Gnomes (animated film)(Voice as Irén)
- 2018 – Hotell Transylvanien 3 (animated film)(Voice as Eunice)

== Theatre ==
Year	Role	Production	Director	Theatre
1985	Medverkande	Skål; Lars Amble, Anders Berglund	Lars Amble	Maximteatern
1989	Anita	West Side Story	Runar Borge	Chinateatern
1992	Medverkande	Mulliga vitaminer Calle Norlén, Sven Hugo Persson, Tomas Tivemark	Mikael Hylin	Stora teatern, Stockholm
1994	Sheila	Hair; Galt MacDermot, Gerome Ragni & James Rado	Runar Borge	Chinateatern
1996	Diana Morales	A Chorus Line; James Kirkwood, Nicholas Dante, Edward Kleban & Marvin Hamlisch	Thomas Ryberger	National Swedish Touring Theatre/ Stora Teatern
2000	Lucy	Jekyll & Hyde – the musical		Östgötateatern
2002	Claudia	Nine; Maury Yeston	Vernon Mound	Malmö musikteater
2003	Sally Bowles	Cabaret; John Kander, Fred Ebb, Joe Masteroff		Linneateatern
2009	Medverkande	Showbusiness: A Hollywood Tribute	Roine Söderlundh	Oscarsteatern
2010	Medverkande	Robert Gustafsson – 25 års jubileum		Rondo, Göteborg, Amiralen; Cirkus, Stockholm
2012	Tartuffe	Tartuffe; Molière	Fredrik Hiller	Hågelbyparken
2015	Velma	Chicago; John Kander, Fred Ebb, Bob Fosse	Roine Söderlundh	Kulturhuset Stadsteatern
2016	Nattens Drottning	Trollflöjten 2.0; Emma Sandanam, Mette Herlitz		Stockholms Parkteater
2018	Pierrette	Åtta kvinnor Robert Thomas	Anna Novovic	Kulturhuset Stadsteatern
