= Jesper Salén =

Swedish physician and former actor (born 1978)

Nils Jesper Alexander Salén (born 5 December 1978) is a Swedish physician and former actor.

== Filmography ==
- Om Stig Petrés hemlighet (TV) (2004)
- Strandvaskaren (2004)
- Ondskan (2003)
- Festival (2001)
- Naken (2000)
- Vita lögner (TV) (1999)
- En liten julsaga (1999)
- Skärgårdsdoktorn (TV) (1998)
- Pappas flicka (TV) (1997)
- Skilda världar (TV) (1997)
- Skuggornas hus (TV) (1996)
- Chewing Gum (1996)
- Pensionat Oskar (1995)
- Kådisbellan (1993)
