= Mikael Håfström =

Swedish filmmaker (born 1960)

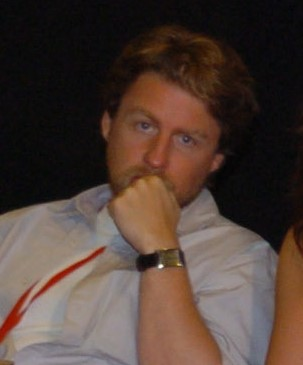
- Håfström at the IFFI (2005)
- Born: Jan Mikael Håfström; 1960 (age 65–66); Lund, Sweden
- Occupations: Film director; screenwriter
- Years active: 1987–present

Jan Mikael Håfström (born 1960) is a Swedish film director and screenwriter. His films include the 2003 film Evil, and the movie adaptation of Stephen King's short story 1408.

== Early life ==
He was born in 1960 in Lund, Sweden, Mikael Håfström studied film at the Stockholm University and the School of Visual Arts.

== Career ==
Håfström's 2003 film Evil was nominated for the Academy Award for Best Foreign Language Film at the 76th Academy Awards. His slasher film, Drowning Ghost, screened at the 2004 Cannes Film Market.

In 2005, Håfström directed Derailed, which starred Clive Owen and Jennifer Aniston.

Håfström directed 1408, a horror film based on the Stephen King short story of the same name and starring John Cusack, in 2007. He collaborated with Cusack again in Shanghai, which premiered at the 2010 Shanghai International Film Festival.

He directed The Rite, an exorcism thriller film starring Anthony Hopkins, in 2011. His 2013 film, Escape Plan, starred Arnold Schwarzenegger and Sylvester Stallone.

In 2013, it was announced that Håfström will direct a film adaptation of Tunnels. In November 2021, it was announced he would direct the sci-fi film Slingshot.

== Filmography ==
Films

Year	Title	Director	Writer	Original title
1995	Vendetta	Yes	No	
2001	Days Like This	Yes	Yes	Leva Livet
2003	Kopps	No	Yes	
2003	Evil	Yes	Yes	Ondskan
2004	Drowning Ghost	Yes	Yes	Strandvaskaren
2005	Derailed	Yes	No	
2007	1408	Yes	No	
2010	Shanghai	Yes	No	
2011	The Rite	Yes	No	
2014	Escape Plan	Yes	No	
2019	The Perfect Patient	Yes	No	Quick
2021	Outside the Wire	Yes	No	
2023	Stockholm Bloodbath	Yes	No	
2024	Slingshot	Yes	No	

Television

Year	Title	Director	Writer	Notes
1989	Terrorns Finger	Yes	No	
1992	Hassel: De Giriga	Yes	Yes	
1992	Botgörarna	Yes	Yes	
1995	Satans mördare	Yes	No	TV4 Riks documentary
1996	Skuggornas Hus	Yes	No	
1997	Chock 1: The Angel of Death	Yes	No	Season 1, episode 1: "Dödsängeln" (6 June 1997)
1997	Chock 2: Kött	No	Yes	
1999	Sjätte Dagen	No	Yes	
2018	Moscow Noir	Yes	Yes	4 of 8 episodes
