= Karl Dyall =

Swedish actor (born 1967)

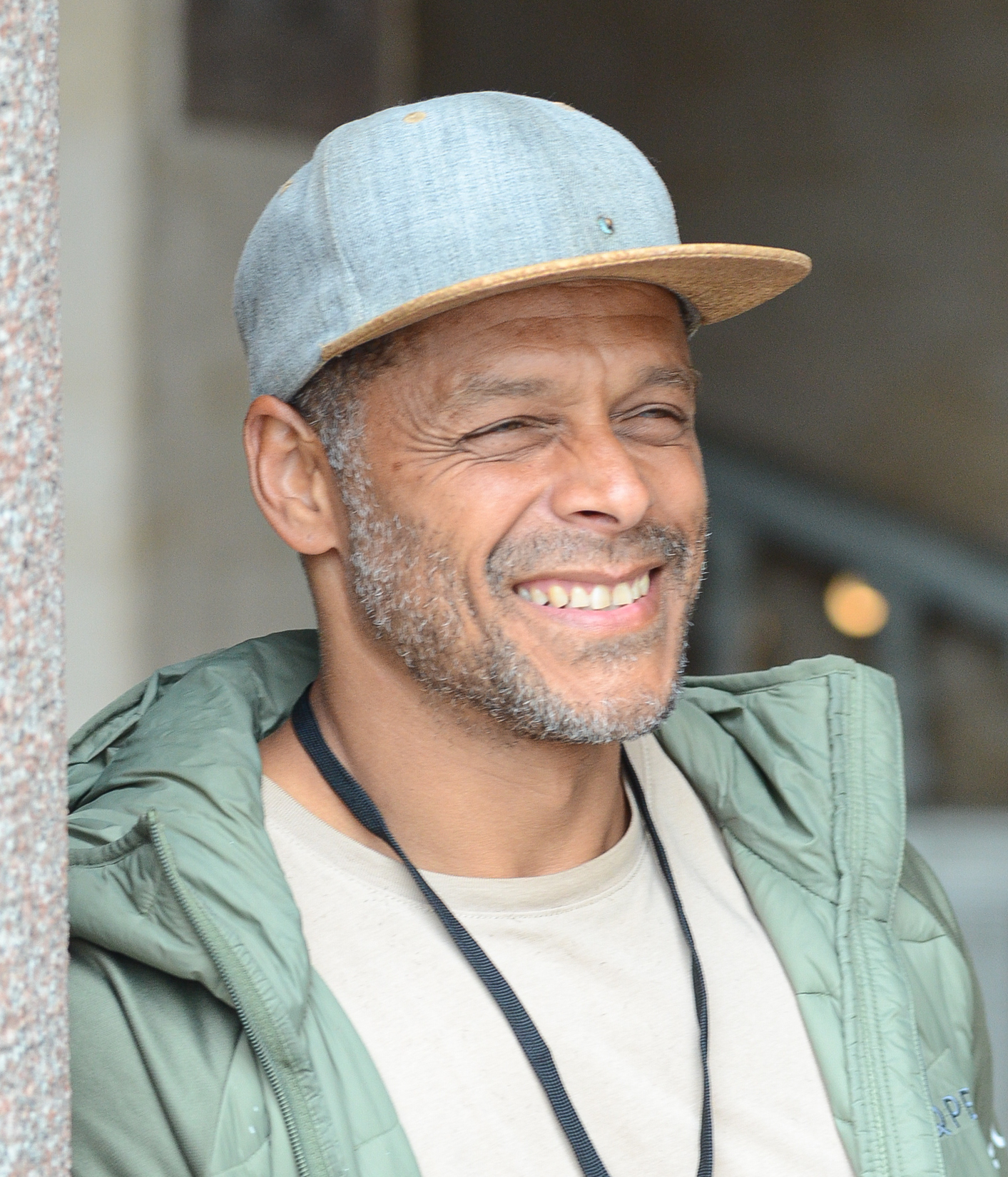
- Dyall in 2023
- Born: Karl Anders Fabian Dyall; 11 February 1967 (age 59); London, England
- Occupations: Actor, singer

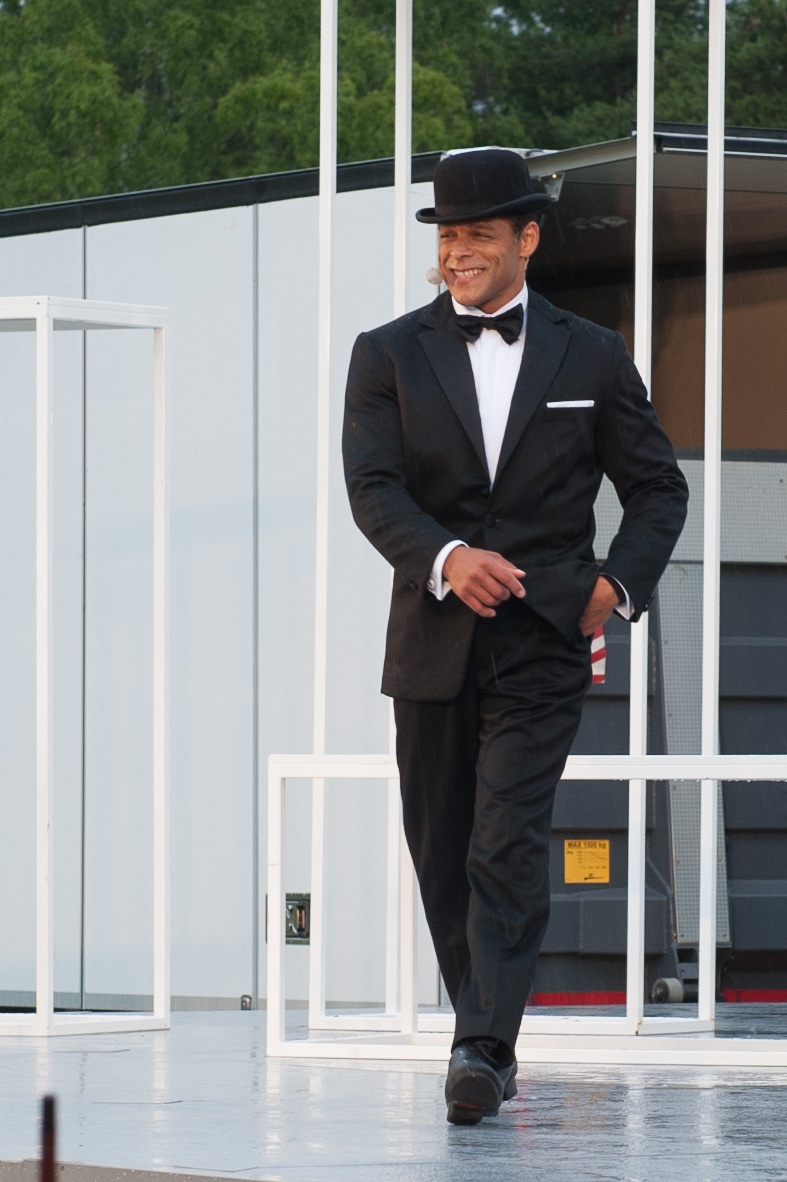
Dyall performing in Stockholm in 2015

Karl Anders Fabian Dyall (born 11 February 1967) is a Swedish dancer, singer and actor.

== Biography ==
Dyall was born in England. His mother was Swedish; his father was a musician from Guyana and he grew up in the West Indies. He is the younger brother of singer Sharon Dyall. When he was eleven he and his family moved to Sweden and resided in Märsta.

In 1984, he became the Swedish champion in breakdance, and also Swedish champion in freestyle dancing in 1986. He was one of the original members of the dance squad BouncE, where he was both dancer and choreographer. He made his stage debut in the musical Fantomen at Scalateatern in Stockholm. He composed the music for the film Stockholmsnatt. He was awarded the Guldmasken award for "Best male lead role" for his role in Fame at Chinateatern in 1992.

Dyall played the role of Emilio in the SVT drama series Rederiet. He has had leading roles in the musicals A Chorus Line, West Side Story, Cabaret, Othello, Little Shop of Horrors and Singin' in the Rain. As a choreographer he has worked with music groups like Ainbusk. He also worked as a choreographer for the musical Hur man lyckas i business utan att bli utbränd at Intiman in Stockholm in 2004. He has worked with Eva Rydberg at Fredriksdalsteatern in Helsingborg. He has also appeared in TV productions including Så ska det låta, Allsång på Skansen, Fort Boyard, Sing along and Melodifestivalen.

== Filmography ==
- 1984 – Freak Out (TV series)
- 1987 – Stockholmsnatt
- 1994 – Rederiet (TV series)
- 1995 – NileCity 105,6 (TV series)
- 2003 – De magiska skorna (voice)
- 2004 – Gustaf (röst)
- 2006 – Min vän Charlotte
- 2013 – Kalle med K (TV series)
- 2014 – From Sammy with love (TV series)
