= Peter Falck =

Swiss politician, diplomat and scholar

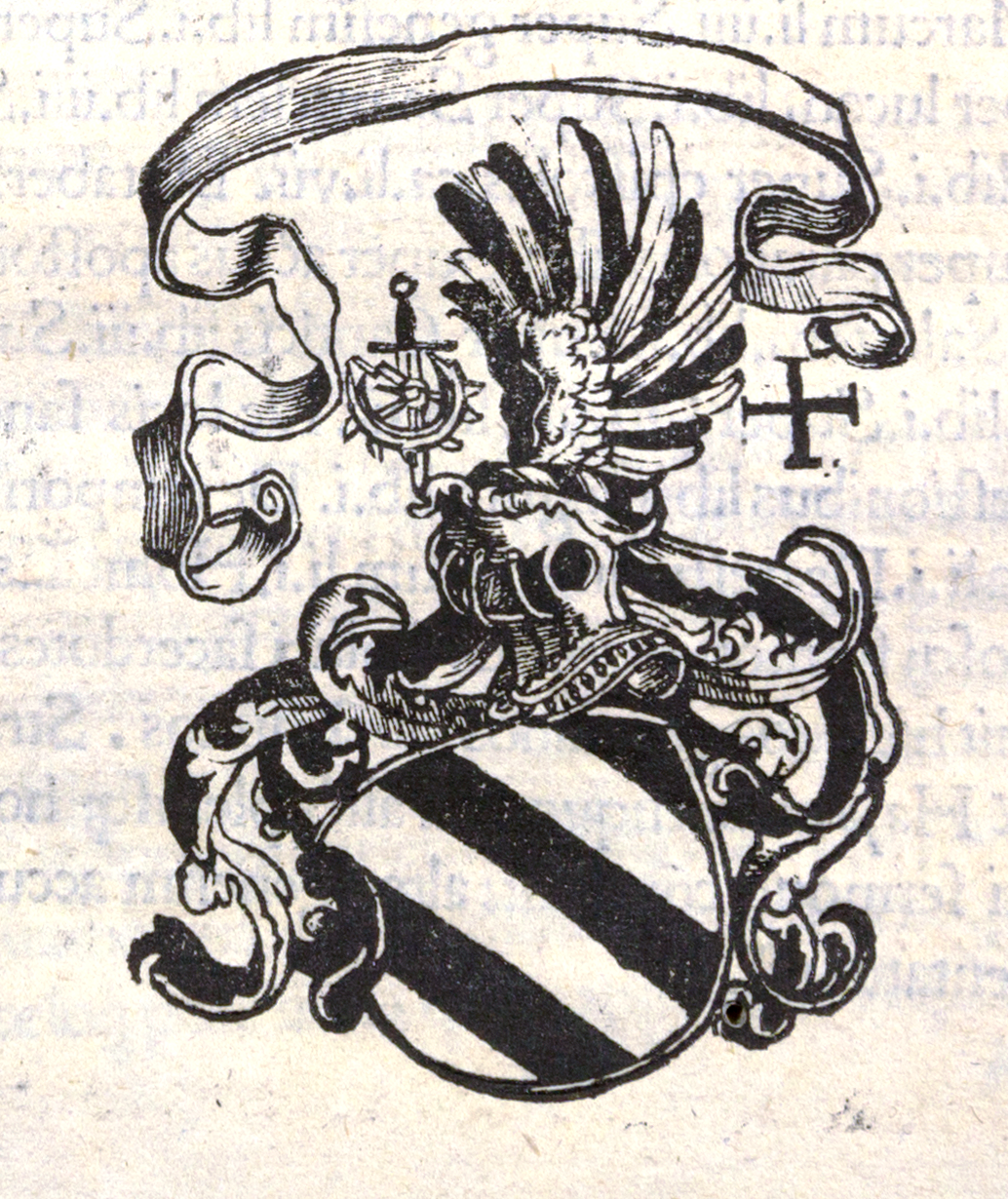
Peter Falck's bookplate

Peter Falck (c. 1468 – 6 October 1519) was a Swiss politician, diplomat and scholar. The library he assembled in his lifetime is considered today as one of the most important in Switzerland.

== Biography ==
Peter Falck was born around 1468 in Fribourg, Switzerland, and grew up in a family of notaries and city clerks. After the death of his father Bernhard (1480), he was sent to Alsace (probably to Kaysersberg) to train in a notarial practice. Upon his return to Fribourg, he entered into local politics. A citizen of Fribourg, he was elected to the Council of Two Hundred (1493), and to the Council of Sixty (1494). Alongside his work as a notary, he pursued a military and administrative career: court clerk (1493–1505), Landrichter (associate judge at a Landgericht), 1502–1504), first bailiff of Villarepos (1503), bailiff of Morat (1505-1510), where he settled with his wife Anna von Garmiswil († 1518) and their daughter Ursula; banneret of the Bourg district (1510-1511); burgomaster of Fribourg (1511-1514); lieutenant-bailiff (1514), and finally Schultheiss bailiff (vice-governor; 1516–1519).

In the last years of the 15th century, Falck was also active beyond the borders of Fribourg. The confederate cantons made their entry into European politics siding with the Empire, France, and the papacy. Negotiating alliances with the different belligerents, they engaged in several conflicts in order to strengthen the borders of their expanding territory. Fribourg, which had joined the Swiss Confederacy in 1481, took part in these conflicts alongside the other cantons. It sent troops in the Hegau and Sundgau during the Swabian War. Several Fribourgers joined the confederate troops in the Italian Wars opposing the King of France, the King of Spain (who fought over the Kingdom of Naples) and the Emperor Maximilian I. From 1510, Fribourg made Falck its representative to the Federal Diet of Switzerland. He followed the troops of Fribourg as a camp clerk and war advisor and finally took command of them on the Italian front. Appointed captain, he led his men to Chiasso (1510), during the winter campaign of 1510 (Kaltwinterzugs) and the campaign of Pavia (1512).

=== The Arsent affair ===
In 1510, instead of renewing their alliance with the King of France, the cantons sided with Pope Julius II (1503–1513), who endeavored to drive the French out of Italy. Matthäus Schiner, cardinal and bishop of Sion (1499–1522), played an important role in the conciliation. However, this political shift had its critics: as a result, the supporters of both opposing camps: those in favor of the Pope and those for the King of France, fought across several cantons. In the canton of Valais, for instance, a conflict found Schiner opposed to Georges Supersaxo, a partisan of the French party. On his way to Lucerne, Supersaxo was arrested in Fribourg: Schiner sued him, and François Arsent, former Schultheiss bailiff (vice-governor) and head of the French party, was appointed to the accused's defense. Arsent allowed Supersaxo to escape and, as a result, had to face popular anger, fueled by the pontifical party, led by Peter Falck. On 18 March 1511, at the outcome of a political trial led by Falck, Supersaxo was sentenced to death for treason.

=== Diplomatic career ===
In 1511, Falck became burgomaster of the city of Fribourg. The following year, the Diet of Baden sent him to Rome alongside the Bernese representative: he was to discuss with Julius II a potential engagement with the Emperor of the Holy League and the consequences this would have on the relationship with Venice, enemy of the Empire. Fribourg also tasked its burgomaster to obtain the elevation of the parish church Saint-Nicholas to the rank of collegiate church, which was eventually to be granted by Julius II. On their arrival in Rome, the Swiss delegates discovered that the Pope had already finalized an agreement with the Emperor. The Pope suggested that they join forces with his own delegation, sent to Venice to pacify the Republic. Although the mission was a failure (Venice formed an alliance with the King of France), it nonetheless enabled Falck to meet the doge Leonardo Loredan. At the end of 1513, Falck left Fribourg once again for Milan. The Federal Diet chose him as one of its two permanent representatives to the Duke Massimiliano Sforza. Sforza appointed him captain of the Martesana, a function that included judiciary, administrative and fiscal duties.

Upon his return to Milan, Falck was appointed Schultheiss bailiff (vice-governor). To thank him for obtaining the elevation of their church, the authorities of Fribourg granted him the right to build a chapel in the new collegiate church for himself and his heirs. As soon as the construction began, Falck announced his intention to go on a pilgrimage to the Holy Land. On 20 April 1515, after obtaining a safe-conduct from the doge Loredan, he left for Venice, where he boarded a galley to Jaffa. On his return from his pilgrimage in January 1516, Falck found that the political situation of his homeland had considerably changed after the defeat of Marignano. Despite his role as head of the pontifical party of Fribourg, the city renewed its trust in him by naming him Schultheiss bailiff (vice-governor) and entrusting him to negotiate peace with the King of France. These new responsibilities raised yet another controversy: Falck was asked to prove his innocence against the "false rumors" that circulated about him. Having played an important role in the negotiations of the "perpetual peace" (1516), he went to Paris with Captain Hans Schwarzmurer to obtain Francis I’s sealing of the treaty. The Confederates also put him in charge of negotiating a scholarship program for Swiss students wishing to study in the French capital. Falck obtained the funding for Swiss students: each canton could send one student for a stay in Paris. The King also made him a "golden knight" (eques auratus) to ensure his loyalty.

=== Death ===
Falck devoted the last years of his life to the defense of Fribourg and the Confederate cantons' interests. At the beginning of 1519, he expressed the wish to return to the Holy Land. He was once again chosen as head of the Company. Leaving from Baden, the Company reached Venice where Falck recorded his last wishes. After a month-long crossing (21 June – 27 July), the Company landed in Jaffa and arrived two and a half weeks later in Jerusalem. On the return journey, several passengers caught a fatal disease in Cyprus, probably either typhus or malaria. Falck himself caught it and died on 6 October 1519 off the coast of Rhodes. Upon the confederate pilgrims' request, his corpse was not thrown overboard but taken onto the island. With the permission of the great master of the order of Saint John of Jerusalem, the pilgrims buried him in the Church of the Observant Franciscans (in all probability in Saint Mary of Victory, which was then one of the most prestigious churches in Rhodes).

== Library ==
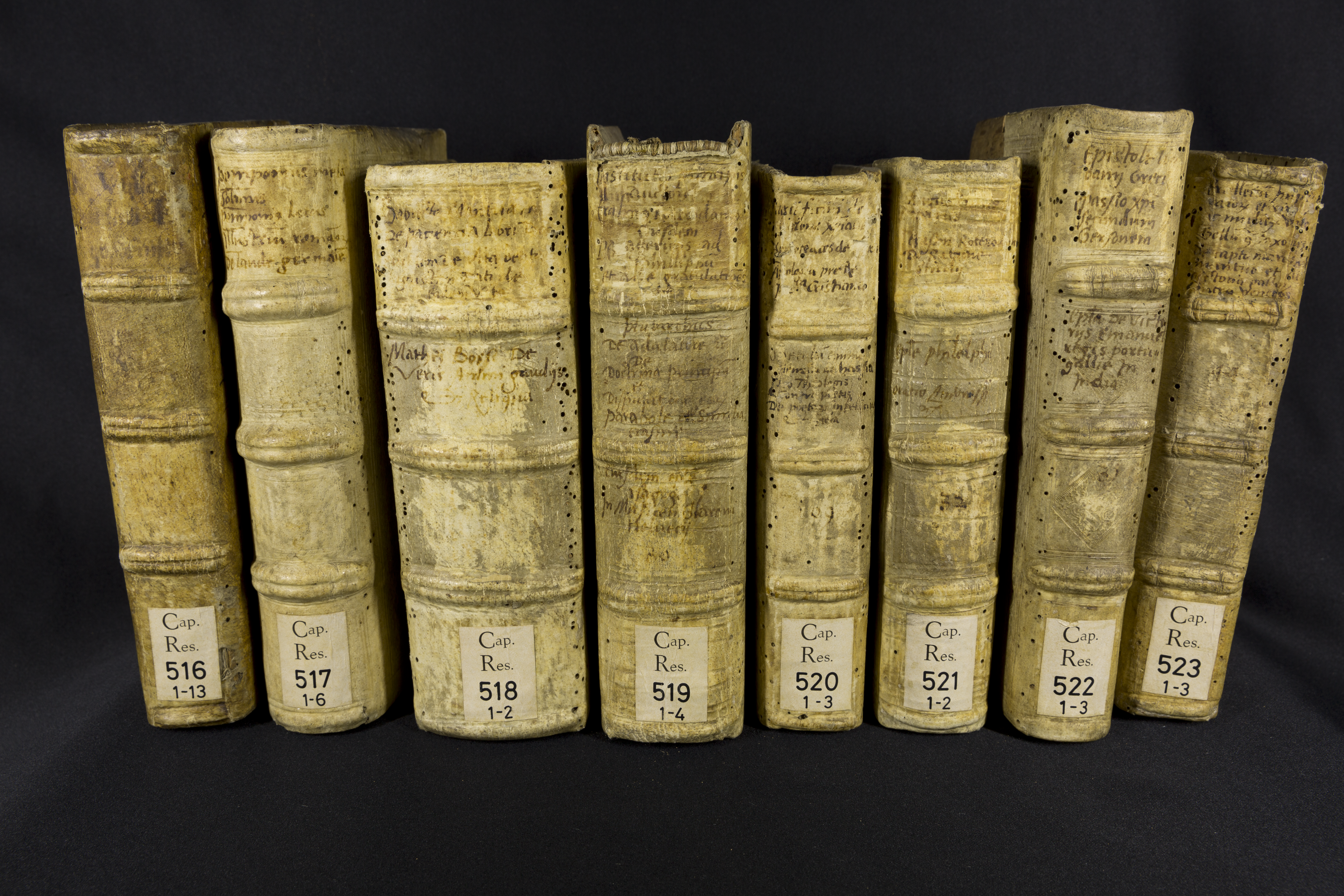
A few books from Falck's library

During his career as a diplomat, Falck developed a humanist ethos through contact with erudite circles. His library included several collections of letters by humanists and ancient writers. This demonstrated Falck's interest in Italian humanism, particularly the works of Erasmus. As an emblematic figure of Fribourg's humanism, Falck also surrounded himself with Swiss humanists with whom he collaborated or to whom he offered protection as a patron: the Lucerner Oswald Geisshüsler (Myconius), Joachim Vadian and Heinrich Glarean, the Glareans Fridolin Eglin (Hirudaeus), Peter and Valentin Tschudi, as well as the Fribourger Peter Cyro (Richardus). Within this network of friends and indebted peers, books were mainly symbolic objects. Given by the patron, it was an emblem of protection and friendship; offered by the protected, it became a gesture of gratitude towards the patron.

Today, only 110 volumes remain of Falck's library: some of these volumes were inventoried by Father Adalbert Wagner and bear the traces of Falck's intervention (signs of possession or annotations); the others are recent discoveries. Ninety six volumes have been located in library collections, archival funds or private collections; 73 have been kept since 1982 at the Cantonal and University Library of Fribourg, and were left to the library in 2004 by the Fribourg Convent of Capuchins; 23 other volumes have been identified in Swiss, French, Belgian, English and American libraries. Of the 14 remaining volumes, only traces have survived – referenced in Falck's letters or in 19th and 20th century secondary literature. Three of these volumes were stolen from the Capuchins in 1974/75, as well as a dozen of ancient prints. The stolen works were immediately put up for sale.
