= Peter Emanuel Falck =

Swedish television producer and screenwriter

- Born: John Peter Emanuel Falck; 15 July 1952 (age 73); Stockholm, Sweden
- Other name: Peter E. Falck
- Occupations: Producer and screenwriter

John Peter Emanuel Falck (born 15 July 1952) is a Swedish television producer and screenwriter. He has created several Swedish-language daytime television serial dramas.

The Stockholm-born son of director Åke Falck, he is a half-brother to author Caroline Falck and criminologist Mikael Rying, Peter's stepmother is Karin Falck; the two have created several television projects together. The first soap opera that he created was Lösa förbindelser, broadcast in 1985 and featuring Börje Ahlstedt and Evabritt Strandberg. His big breakthrough came in 1987, when he created and wrote the popular series Varuhuset.

He and screenwriter Louise Boije af Gennäs co-created the series Rederiet which premiered on 20 August 1992 on SVT. The series was well-received, and continued on SVT until 2002. He also created the TV4 series Tre Kronor which had its premiere in 1994. In late 2007 his series Andra Avenyn premiered on SVT, and continued until 2010.

Falck directed the web-spinoff from the Andra Avenyn series called Riverside, which viewers could see on SVTs website. He is currently developing and producing projects for the production company Filmlance International.
