= Varuhuset =

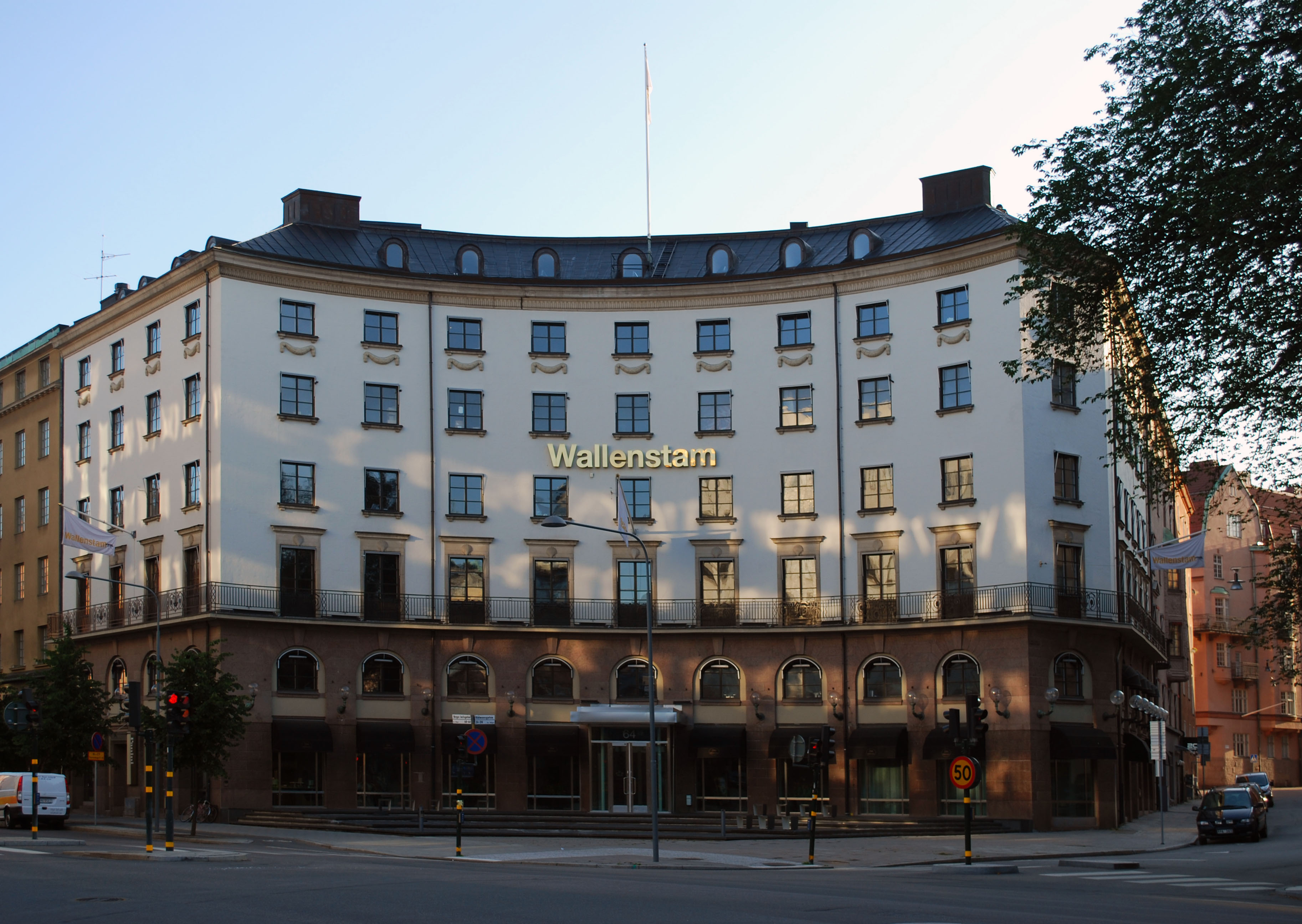
- The exterior of the department store for the series
- Genre: Drama
- Created by: Peter Emanuel Falck
- Starring: Sven Holmberg; Christina Schollin; Marika Lindström; Stefan Ekman; Bertil Norström; Lena Endre; Heinz Hopf; Willie Andréason; Johan Hedenberg
- Composer: Anders Neglin
- Country of origin: Sweden
- Original language: Swedish
- No. of seasons: 5
- No. of episodes: 60

Original release
- Network: SVT
- Release: 19 March 1987 – 8 April 1989

Varuhuset (The Department Store) is a Swedish drama series that aired on SVT in 60 episodes between 19 March 1987 and 8 April 1989. The series was created by Peter Emanuel Falck.

Among the actors appearing in the series were Görel Crona, Lena Endre, Sharon Dyall, Christina Schollin, and Johan Hedenberg as Jonas, a villain.
