= Vänner och fiender =

- Also known as: Vänner & fiender
- Genre: Soap opera
- Written by: Bror Yngve Anderson; Thérèse Fernström
- Directed by: Bengt Bauler; Mats Borg
- Starring: Allan Svensson; Leif Ahrle; Anki Lidén; Sussie Ericsson
- Country of origin: Sweden
- Original language: Swedish

Production
- Production locations: Hallstahammar, Västmanlands län, Sweden
- Production company: Jarowskij AB

Original release
- Release: 20 October 1996

Vänner och fiender (Friends and Foes) is a Swedish soap opera that aired between 1996 and 2000. It was produced by Jarowskij and first broadcast on TV3, but in 1997 Kanal 5 purchased the rights to broadcast it. The channel did so until 2000 when the show was cancelled. A total of 720 episodes were shot.

The show takes place in a fictional town called Erikshamn.

A Norwegian version named Venner og fiender was also produced on sister network TVNorge in 1998, with a total of 170 episodes. However, disappointingly low viewership (33,000 viewers out of a potential 200,000) caused the last 30 episodes to never be aired.

== Cast ==
- Allan Svensson as Sven-Olof Sundin
- Leif Ahrle as Bosse Åqvist
- Anki Lidén as Karin Sundin
- Sussie Ericsson as Bitte Petersson
- Louise Edlind as Marianne Åqvist (1996–2000)
- Eric Donell as Jörgen Sjölinder
- Rachel Mohlin as Kicki Lindberger
- Jenny Ulving as Gabriella 'Bella' Åqvist
- Henrik Norberg as Niklas Sundin (1996–2000)
- Daniel Nyren as Henrik Rahm (1996–2000)
- Anna Hansson as Pernilla Sundin
- Miroslav Ozanic as Miro Rakovic
- Martin De Marino as Dragan Rakovic
- Niklas Engdahl as Toni Silvestri (1996–1999)
- Anton Tyskling as Anton Rahm (1996–1999)
- Sara Alström as Madeleine Åqvist (1997–1998)
- Janne 'Loffe' Carlsson as Himself
- Stig Engström as Leonard Alfvén (1999–2000)
- Lisa Fabre as Lotta Grebke (1998–1999)
- Per Holmberg as Kapten Grebke (1998–1999)
- Petra Hultgren as Madeleine Åqvist (1996–1997)
- Lisa Kock as Elinor Alfvén (1999)
- Johanna Lazcano Osterman as Cecilia (1998–1999)
- Ahnna Rasch as Jenny Eriksson (1997–1999)
- Sara Sommerfeld as Susanna (1996–1997)
- Mia Ternström as Stephanie (1999)
- Henrik Liljegren as skater (1999)
