= List of Swedish films of the 1970s =

This is a list of films produced in Sweden and in the Swedish language in the 1970s.

== 1970 ==
English Title	Director	Cast	Genre	Swedish Title	Notes
Ann and Eve	Arne Mattsson	Gio Petré, Marie Liljedahl, Francisco Rabal	Drama	Ann och Eve - de erotiska	Swedish/Yugoslav co-production
A Baltic Tragedy	Johan Bergenstråhle	Bo Brundin, Anneli Sauli, Yrjö Tähtelä	Drama	Baltutlämningen	Entered into the 20th Berlin International Film Festival
Blushing Charlie	Vilgot Sjöman	Bernt Lundquist, Solveig Ternström, Tomas Bolme	Drama	Lyckliga skitar	Entered into the 21st Berlin International Film Festival
The Lustful Vicar	Torgny Wickman	Jarl Borssén, Margit Carlqvist, Magali Noël	Comedy	Kyrkoherden	
A Swedish Love Story	Roy Andersson	Ann-Sofie Kylin, Rolf Sohlman, Anita Lindblom	Drama	En kärlekshistoria	Entered into the 20th Berlin International Film Festival

== 1971 ==
English Title	Director	Cast	Genre	Swedish Title	Notes
The Apple War	Tage Danielsson	Gösta Ekman, Hans Alfredsson, Tage Danielsson, Monica Zetterlund, Max von Sydow	Comedy-drama	Äppelkriget	
The Emigrants	Jan Troell	Max von Sydow, Liv Ullmann, Eddie Axberg, Monica Zetterlund	Drama	Utvandrarna	Nominated for four Academy Awards in 1972, including Best Picture; won New York Film Critics Circle Awards 1972 and a Golden Globe for Best Actress
Joe Hill	Bo Widerberg	Thommy Berggren, Anja Schmidt, Kelvin Malave	Biopic	Joe Hill	Won the Jury Prize at the 1971 Cannes Film Festival
The Touch	Ingmar Bergman	Elliott Gould, Bibi Andersson, Max von Sydow	Drama	Beröringen	Spoken in English

== 1972 ==
English Title	Director	Cast	Genre	Swedish Title	Notes
Andersson's Kalle	Arne Stivell	Sickan Carlsson, Sten-Åke Cederhök, Britta Holmberg	Comedy	Anderssonskans Kalle	
Cries and Whispers	Ingmar Bergman	Harriet Andersson, Kari Sylwan, Ingrid Thulin, Liv Ullmann	Drama	Viskningar och rop	Won the Academy Award for Best Cinematography, nominated for four other Academy Awards including Best Picture
Honeymoon	Claes Lundberg	Lena Lindgren, Lena-Pia Bernhardsson, Tord Peterson	Drama	Smekmånad	Entered into the 22nd Berlin International Film Festival
The Man Who Quit Smoking	Tage Danielsson	Gösta Ekman, Carl-Gustaf Lindstedt, Gunn Wållgren	Comedy	Mannen som slutade röka	
The New Land	Jan Troell	Max von Sydow, Liv Ullmann, Eddie Axberg	Drama	Nybyggarna	Sequel to The Emigrants

== 1973 ==
English Title	Director	Cast	Genre	Swedish Title	Notes
Andersson's Kalle on Top Form	Arne Stivell	Sickan Carlsson, Sten-Åke Cederhök, Britta Holmberg	Comedy	Anderssonskans Kalle i busform	
Anita	Torgny Wickman	Christina Lindberg, Stellan Skarsgård, Arne Ragneborn	Drama	Anita – ur en tonårsflickas dagbok	
Scenes from a Marriage	Ingmar Bergman	Liv Ullmann, Erland Josephson, Bibi Andersson	Drama	Scener ur ett äktenskap	Won Golden Globe Award for Best Foreign Language Film, 1975
Thriller – A Cruel Picture	Alex Fridolinski	Christina Lindberg, Heinz Hopf, Per-Axel Arosenius	Exploitation	Thriller – en grym film	

== 1974 ==
English Title	Director	Cast	Genre	Swedish Title	Notes
Gangsterfilmen	Lars G. Thelestam	Clu Gulager, Ernst Günther, Per Oscarsson	Crime	Gangsterfilmen	Entered into the 25th Berlin International Film Festival
A Handful of Love	Vilgot Sjöman	Anita Ekström, Ingrid Thulin, Gösta Bredefeldt	Drama	En handfull kärlek	Entered into the 24th Berlin International Film Festival
The Last Adventure	Jan Halldoff	Göran Stangertz, Ann Zacharias, Marianne Aminoff	Drama	Det sista äventyret	

== 1975 ==
English Title	Director	Cast	Genre	Swedish Title	Notes
Giliap	Roy Andersson	Thommy Berggren, Mona Seilitz, Pernilla August	Drama	Giliap	
A Guy and a Gal	Lasse Hallström	Brasse Brännström, Börje Ahlstedt, Chatarina Larsson	Comedy	En kille och en tjej	
The Magic Flute	Ingmar Bergman	Josef Köstlinger, Irma Urrila, Håkan Hagegård, Ulrik Cold	Opera	Trollflöjten	
Maria	Mats Arehn	Lis Nilheim, Janne Carlsson, Ulf Hasseltorp	Drama	Maria	
Release the Prisoners to Spring	Tage Danielsson	Ernst-Hugo Järegård, Lena Nyman, Margaretha Krook	Comedy	Släpp fångarne loss, det är vår!	
What the Swedish Butler Saw	Vernon P. Becker	Ole Søltoft, Sue Longhurst, Diana Dors	Comedy	Champagnegalopp	
The White Wall	Stig Björkman	Harriet Andersson, Lena Nyman, Sven Wollter	Drama	Den vita väggen	Entered into the 9th Moscow International Film Festival

== 1976 ==
English Title	Director	Cast	Genre	Swedish Title	Notes
Bel Ami	Mac Ahlberg	Harry Reems, Christa Linder, Marie Forså	Comedy	Bel Ami	
Buddies	Jan Halldoff	Anki Lidén, Göran Stangertz, Thomas Hellberg	Drama	Polare	
City of My Dreams	Ingvar Skogsberg	Eddie Axberg, Märta Dorff, Peter Lindgren	Drama	Mina drömmars stad	
Elvis! Elvis!	Kay Pollak	Lena-Pia Bernhardsson, Allan Edwall, Kent Andersson	Drama	Elvis! Elvis!	Entered into the 10th Moscow International Film Festival
Face to Face	Ingmar Bergman	Liv Ullmann, Erland Josephson, Gunnar Björnstrand	Drama	Ansikte mot ansikte	Nominated for Academy Awards for Best Actress (Ullmann) and Best Director (Bergman); won Golden Globe Award for Best Foreign Language Film, 1977
Hello Baby	Johan Bergenstråhle	Marie-Louise Ekman, Anders Ek, Siv Ericks	Drama	Hallo Baby	
The Man on the Roof	Bo Widerberg	Carl-Gustaf Lindstedt, Sven Wollter, Thomas Hellberg	Crime thriller	Mannen på taket	
Sven Klang's Combo	Stellan Olsson	Henric Holmberg, Eva Remaeus, Christer Boustedt	Drama	Sven Klangs kvintett	

== 1977 ==
English Title	Director	Cast	Genre	Swedish Title	Notes
ABBA: The Movie	Lasse Hallström	ABBA	Musical		A film about the Swedish pop group ABBA
Bang!	Jan Troell	Susan Hampshire, Yvonne Lombard, Ulf Palme	Drama	Bang!	Entered into the 1977 Cannes Film Festival
The Brothers Lionheart	Olle Hellbom	Staffan Götestam, Lars Söderdahl, Allan Edwall	Fantasy	Bröderna Lejonhjärta	Based on the novel by Astrid Lindgren; entered into the 28th Berlin International Film Festival
Games of Love and Loneliness	Anja Breien	Lil Terselius , Chatarina Larsson, Birgitta Andersson	Drama	Den allvarsamma leken	
Summer Paradise	Gunnel Lindblom	Marianne Aminoff, Birgitta Valberg, Sif Ruud	Drama	Paradistorg	

== 1978 ==
English Title	Director	Cast	Genre	Swedish Title	Notes
The Adventures of Picasso	Tage Danielsson	Gösta Ekman, Margaretha Krook, Lena Olin	Comedy	Picassos äventyr	
Autumn Sonata	Ingmar Bergman	Ingrid Bergman, Liv Ullmann, Lena Nyman	Drama	Hostsonaten	Nominated for two Academy Awards; won Golden Globe Award for Best Foreign Language Film, 1979
The Walls of Freedom	Marianne Ahrne	Annicka Kronberg, Marianne Stjernqvist, Torgny Anderberg	Drama	Frihetens murar	Entered into the 11th Moscow International Film Festival

== 1979 ==
English Title	Director	Cast	Genre	Swedish Title	Notes
Christopher's House	Lars Lennart Forsberg	Thommy Berggren, Agneta Eckemyr, Börje Ahlstedt	Drama	Kristoffers hus	Entered into the 1980 Cannes Film Festival
Herr Puntila and His Servant Matti	Ralf Långbacka	Lasse Pöysti, Arja Saijonmaa	Drama	Herr Puntila och hans dräng Matti	
Kejsaren	Jösta Hagelbäck	Anders Åberg, Sigurd Björling	Drama	Kejsaren	Entered into the 29th Berlin International Film Festival
Repmånad	Lasse Åberg	Lasse Åberg, Janne 'Loffe' Carlsson, Ted Åström	Comedy	Repmånad	
Victoria	Bo Widerberg	Michaela Jolin, Stephan Schwartz, Christiane Hörbiger, Hans Christian Blech, Peter Schildt	Drama	Victoria	Entered into the 1979 Cannes Film Festival
You're Out of Your Mind, Maggie	Göran Graffman	Jonna Liljendahl, Liv Alsterlund, Monica Nordquist	Comedy	Du är inte klok, Madicken	
