= Du är inte klok, Madicken =

- Directed by: Göran Graffman
- Screenplay by: Astrid Lindgren
- Produced by: Olle Hellbom; Olle Nordemar
- Starring: Jonna Liljendahl
- Cinematography: Jörgen Persson
- Music by: Bengt Hallberg
- Distributed by: AB Svensk Filmindustri
- Release date: 14 December 1979 (Sweden)
- Running time: 103 minutes
- Country: Sweden
- Language: Swedish

Du är inte klok, Madicken is a 1979 Swedish film about the Astrid Lindgren character Madicken, directed by Göran Graffman.

== Cast ==
- Jonna Liljendahl as Margareta "Madicken" Engström
- Liv Alsterlund as Lisabet
- Monica Nordquist as Kajsa
- Björn Granath as Jonas
- Lis Nilheim as Alva
- Birgitta Andersson as Emma Nilsson
- Allan Edwall as Emil P. Nilsson
- Sebastian Håkansson as Abbe Nilsson
- Kerstin Hansson as Mia
- Cecilia Orlando-Willberg as Mattis
- Fillie Lyckow as teacher
- Jan Nygren as headmaster
- Björn Gustafson as doctor

== Production ==
After the 1977 film The Brothers Lionheart, Olle Hellbom decided to take a break as director and just be producer for Du är inte klok, Madicken and the 1980 film Madicken på Junibacken. The choice of director instead fell on Graffman.

Järsta gård was used as the fictive farm Junibacken and the city scenes were taken in Söderköping.
