= Fillie Lyckow =

Swedish actress

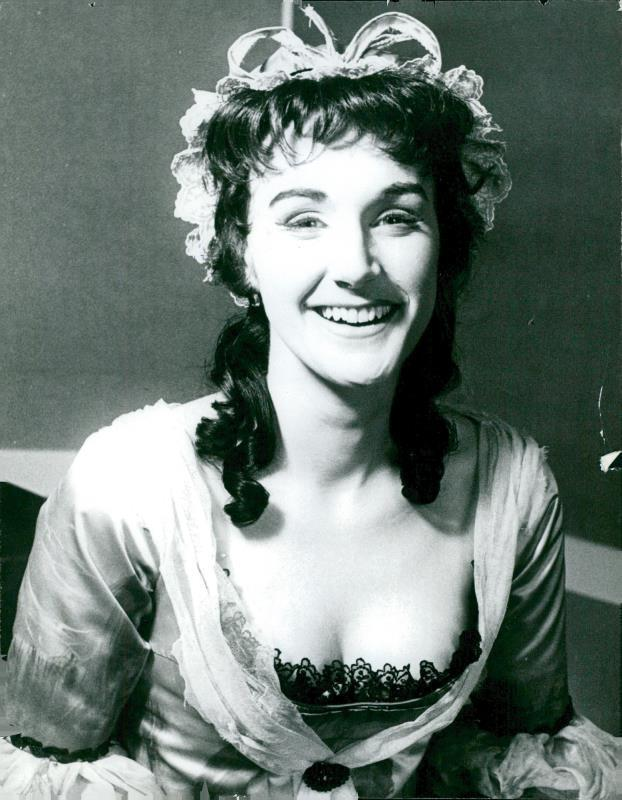
Fillie Lyckow

Fillie Lyckow (31 October 1934 – 27 March 2015) was a Swedish actress. She has acted in the films about Maggie (Madicken) and the Swedish TV series "Varuhuset" (The Department Store). In 2007/2008 she was the von Trapp maid, Frau Schmidt, in The Sound of Music at Göta Lejon. She died on 27 March 2015.

== Filmography ==
- 1961 - Lustgården - Berta
- 1964 - The Dress - Butiksbiträde
- 1973 - Luftburen - Marianne
- 1974 - Straffet - Barnavårdsassistenten
- 1977 - Mackan - Kenneths mor
- 1978 - En och en - Malin
- 1979 - Madicken - Fröken
- 1979 - Du är inte klok Madicken - Fröken
- 1980 - Flygnivå 450 - Sjuksköterska
- 1980 - Madicken på Junibacken - Fröken
- 1982 - Brusten Himmel - Ebba
- 1984 - Sömnen - Alma
- 1987 - Varuhuset - Aina Lindgren
- 1988 - Kråsnålen - Fru Blomqvist
- 1989 - Tre kärlekar (TV-serie, gästroll) - Fredrika Melin
- 1994 - Svensson Svensson - Dagmar
- 2000 - Nya tider - Liselotte Rosén
- 2009 - Guldkungen
- 2009 - Livet i Fagervik
