= List of Rederiet episodes =

The following is an episode list for the SVT television series Rederiet. The series premiered on 20 August 1992, ran for 318 episodes, and ended on 18 April 2002.

== Series overview ==
Series	Episodes	Originally released	
Series	Episodes	First released	Last released
1	18	20 August 1992	17 December 1992
2	12	14 January 1993	1 April 1993
3	15	9 September 1993	16 December 1993
4	12	13 January 1994	7 April 1994
5	15	8 September 1994	22 December 1994
6	12	12 January 1995	30 March 1995
7	15	7 September 1995	21 December 1995
8	15	11 January 1996	18 April 1996
9	15	12 September 1996	19 December 1996
10	15	9 January 1997	17 April 1997
11	18	21 August 1997	18 December 1997
12	18	8 January 1998	7 May 1998
13	18	20 August 1998	17 December 1998
14	18	14 January 1999	13 May 1999
15	18	26 August 1999	23 December 1999
16	18	13 January 2000	11 May 2000
17	18	24 August 2000	21 December 2000
18	18	11 January 2001	10 May 2001
19	18	23 August 2001	20 December 2001
20	12	31 January 2002	18 April 2002

== Episodes ==
=== Season 1 ===
No. overall	No. in season	Title	Directed by	Written by	Original release date	Prod. code
1	1	"Farlig kryssning"	Mikael Ekman	Björn Gunnarsson, Louise Boije af Gennäs & Mikael Ekman	20 August 1992	101
Some demonstrators attacking outside Dahlén's office, caused by Reidar Dahlén's plan to expand his ferry terminal. Rolf Dahlén's romantically love affair with Sofie Sjögren, even of his marriage to Yvonne, is revealed for the viewers. Rebecca's boyfriend, photographer Ola Simonsson, riggs a bomb on board but the bomb is thrown in the water by Rolf at the end of episode one.
2	2	"Lugnt vatten"	Mikael Ekman	Björn Gunnarsson, Louise Boije af Gennäs & Mikael Ekman	27 August 1992	102
3	3	"Lära så länge man lever"	Mikael Ekman	Björn Gunnarsson & Bror Yngve Andersson	3 September 1992	103
4	4	"En joker i leken"	Filippa Wallström	Björn Gunnarsson & Carolina Falck	10 September 1992	104
5	5	"Stormvarning"	Filippa Wallström	Björn Gunnarsson & Bror Yngve Anderson	17 September 1992	105
6	6	"Sanning och konsekvens"	Filippa Wallström	Björn Gunnarsson & Bror Yngve Anderson	24 September 1992	106
Ellinor learns from Yvonne that Reidar is the father of Tony by his brief love affair with Gerd in the 60's.
7	7	"Stoppa pressarna"	Marcelo Racana	Björn Gunnarsson & Louise Boije af Gennäs	1 October 1992	107
Shocked and depressed, Ellinor throws herself over board from Freja and dies in the water.
8	8	"Ringar på vattnet"	Marcelo Racana	Björn Gunnarsson & Carolina Falck	8 October 1992	108
9	9	"Ulv i fårakläder"	Marcelo Racana	Björn Gunnarsson & Bror Yngve Andersson	15 October 1992	109
10	10	"Lika barn leka bäst"	Mikael Ekman	Björn Gunnarsson & Mikael Ekman	22 October 1992	110
11	11	"In i dimman"	Mikael Ekman	Björn Gunnarsson, Liselott Svensson & Mikael Ekman	29 October 1992	111
12	12	"Att ha och inte ha"	Mikael Ekman	Björn Gunnarsson, Bror Yngve Andersson	5 November 1992	112
13	13	"Allt har ett pris"	Filippa Wallström	Björn Gunnarsson & Liselott Svensson	12 November 1992	113
14	14	"Farlig lek"	Filippa Wallström	Björn Gunnarsson & Liselott Svensson	19 November 1992	114
15	15	"Falskspel"	Filippa Wallström	Björn Gunnarsson & Carolina Falck	26 November 1992	115
16	16	"Dubbelspel"	Marcelo Racana	Björn Gunnarsson & Bror Yngve Andersson	3 December 1992	116
17	17	"Försvunnen till havs"	Marcelo Racana	Björn Gunnarsson & Bror Yngve Andersson	10 December 1992	117
18	18	"Upp i rök"	Marcelo Racana	Björn Gunnarsson & Bror Yngve Andersson	17 December 1992	118
Rolf Dahlén agrees to be the new president of Dahlén Shipping Line, to his sister Renate's deep anger. At the end, Dahlén's leading group (including Reidar, Rolf, Renate, Tom Hansson and Henrik) is introduced to the new ship Karisma. Suddenly, the ship began to burn and explodes into flames.

=== Season 2 ===
No. overall	No. in season	Title	Directed by	Written by	Original release date	Prod. code
19	1	"Ur askan i elden"	Filippa Wallström	Bror Yngve Andersson	14 January 1993	201
Tom Hansson died in the fatal fire at Karisma, and Renate fell into a coma both to Reidar's and Rolf's sad. Rolf is now the new president of Dahlén Shipping Line, but is introduced to the intriguing business woman Elisabeth Lerwacht that Reidar has hired. Sara Torstensson (played by Pia Green) arrives as new captain on Freja.
20	2	"Skamfläckar sitter djupt"	Filippa Wallström	Liselott Svensson	21 January 1993	202
21	3	"Tjockare än vatten"	Filippa Wallström	Charlotte Lesche	28 January 1993	203
Björn Lindman and Yngve Almkvist is both written out of the show.
22	4	"Lysande utsikter"	Marcelo Racana	Lotten Strömstedt	4 February 1993	204
23	5	"En vän i nöden"	Marcelo Racana	Carolina Falck	11 February 1993	205
24	6	"Vapenskrammel"	Marcelo Racana	Bror Yngve Anderson	18 February 1993	206
25	7	"Första kyssen"	Christian Wikander	Anna Fredriksson	25 February 1993	207
26	8	"Dubbelspel"	Christian Wikander	Åsa Furuhagen	4 March 1993	208
27	9	"Var går gränsen"	Christian Wikander	Liselott Svensson	11 March 1993	209
28	10	"På drift"	Filippa Wallström	Åsa Furuhagen	18 March 1993	210
29	11	"Falskt spel"	Filippa Wallström	Charlotte Lesche	25 March 1993	211
30	12	"Nån gång i nästa liv"	Filippa Wallström	Jonas Frykberg	1 April 1993	212
Rolf is fired as the president of Dahlén Shipping Line by his own father and Elisabeth. Rebecca leaves the country with Ola, but he is arrested at the airport and she leaves pregnant on her own. Tony and Sara discovers the weapons that Jussi and the Russians smuggles on board, and gets shot by the Russian smuggler Boris, who is killed by Jussi at the end. Louise Belfrage leaves as Lina.

=== Season 3 ===
No. overall	No. in season	Title	Directed by	Written by	Original release date	Prod. code
31	1	"Krav och motkrav"	Marcelo Racana	Liselott Svensson	9 September 1993	301
Tony survived the shot on board, and Jussi is hunted by the Russian smugglers. Rolf returns to Dahlén as production manager for the new ship.
32	2	"Sammansvärjning"	Marcelo Racana	Bror Yngve Anderson	16 September 1993	302
33	3	"Insiders"	Marcelo Racana	Bror Yngve Anderson	23 September 1993	303
34	4	"Ändrade planer"	Thomas Hellberg	Anna Fredriksson	30 September 1993	304
35	5	"Främmande fåglar"	Thomas Hellberg	Magnus Westerberg	7 October 1993	305
36	6	"I kärlekens kölvatten"	Thomas Hellberg	Eva Brise	14 October 1993	306
Louise Belfrage returns as Lina for three episodes.
37	7	"Ändrad kurs"	Christian Wikander	Bo Tidelius & Magnus Lind	21 October 1993	307
Rolf is tired of Elisabeth and resigns as production manager, which makes Reidar mad as hell.
38	8	"Rent spel"	Christian Wikander	Liselott Svensson	28 October 1993	308
Louise Belfrage leaves the cast again as Lina.
39	9	"Skuggor av det förflutna"	Christian Wikander	Åsa Furuhagen	4 November 1993	309
40	10	"I samma båt"	Christjan Wegner	Bror Yngve Anderson	11 November 1993	310
41	11	"Kärlek med förhinder"	Christjan Wegner	Tomas Blom	18 November 1993	311
42	12	"Fiske utan fångst"	Christjan Wegner	Magnus Westerberg	25 November 1993	312
43	13	"På höga höjder"	Thomas Hellberg	Jonas Frykberg	2 December 1993	313
44	14	"Besked väntas"	Thomas Hellberg	Anna Fredriksson	9 December 1993	314
45	15	"Oro och uppbrott"	Thomas Hellberg	Bror Yngve Anderson	16 December 1993	315
Rolf and Yvonne, now remarried, is on their way home from the office. Yvonne asks him to move away, while she drives the car. Suddenly, they have to drive behind a truck but Yvonne loses control of the car and they crashes right into a traffic sign and then right into a container where the fire fatally explodes. Mikael Samuelson leaves the cast as Rolf.

=== Season 4 ===
No.	Title	Original release date	Prod. code
46	"Spårlös försvunnen"	13 January 1994	401
During his placement at the hospital for his fatally injuries, Rolf asks Yvonne to help him die. Gunilla Magnusson returns to the cast as Rebecca. Mikael Samuelson does his last and brief appearance as Rolf only for the episode.
47	"Familjefadern"	20 January 1994	402
48	"Jokers beslut"	27 January 1994	403
49	"Nyanställd"	3 February 1994	404
50	"Lockande erbjudande"	10 February 1994	405
51	"Larmet går"	24 February 1994	406
52	"Frasande siden"	3 March 1994	407
Pehr Silver sails into the cast
53	"I hetaste laget"	10 March 1994	408
54	"Förföljd av otur"	17 March 1994	409
55	"Snedsteg med följder"	24 March 1994	410
56	"Mystiska villovägar"	31 March 1994	411
57	"Stilla natt"	7 April 1994	412
Gunilla Paulsen and Mikael Persbrandt leaves the cast again as Rebecca and Ola respectively, and so does even Pia Green as Sara Torstensson.

=== Season 5 ===
No.	Title	Original release date	Prod. code
58	"Ont uppsåt"	8 September 1994	501
Beatrice Ericson returns to Sweden with Carl Ericson(Carl in episode 59)
59	"Oväntat besök"	15 September 1994	502
Carl Ericson sails into the cast.
60	"Uppgörelsen"	22 September 1994	503
Suzanne Reuters leaves the cast as Renate.
61	"Natten har ögon"	6 October 1994	504
62	"Enda vittnet"	13 October 1994	505
63	"Pengarna eller livet"	20 October 1994	506
64	"Nya krafter"	27 October 1994	507
65	"Äkta Silver"	3 November 1994	508
66	"Far och son"	10 November 1994	509
67	"Skott i natten"	17 November 1994	510
68	"Efterlyst"	24 November 1994	511
69	"Sanningar och lögner"	1 December 1994	512
70	"Avslöjad"	8 December 1994	513
71	"Spruckna drömmar"	15 December 1994	514
72	"Demaskering"	22 December 1994	515
Gunilla Paulsen returns once more as Rebecka Dahlén for this episode. Erik Kiviniemi leaves the cast as Jussi Tola.

=== Season 6 ===
No.	Title	Original release date	Prod. code
73	"Uppbrott och återkomst"	12 January 1995	601
Lo Wahl leaves the cast as Kåkå.
74	"Eld i håg"	19 January 1995	602
75	"Tillbaka vid rodret"	26 January 1995	603
76	"Motivet heter hämnd"	2 February 1995	604
77	"Makten att älska"	9 February 1995	605
78	"Förbjuden kärlek"	16 February 1995	606
79	"Kvitt eller dubbelt"	23 February 1995	607
80	"Säkra papper"	2 March 1995	608
81	"På bar gärning"	9 March 1995	609
82	"Tala är silver"	16 March 1995	610
83	"Sonad skuld"	23 March 1995	611
84	"En hjältes skepnad"	30 March 1995	612
Per Morberg leaves the cast as Viggo Strieber.

=== Season 7 ===
No.	Title	Original release date	Prod. code
85	"Vinna eller försvinna"	7 September 1995	701
86	"I stormens öga"	14 September 1995	702
87	"Sant eller falskt?"	21 September 1995	703
88	"Bara en varning"	5 October 1995	704
89	"Ingen utväg"	12 October 1995	705
90	"Viljans makt"	19 October 1995	706
91	"Mellan fyra ögon"	26 October 1995	707
92	"Bot och bättring"	2 November 1995	708
93	"Bekännelser"	9 November 1995	709
94	"Herre på täppan"	16 November 1995	710
95	"Efter natt kommer dag"	23 November 1995	711
96	"Skenet bedrar"	30 November 1995	712
97	"När leken blir allvar"	7 December 1995	713
98	"Vägskäl"	14 December 1995	714
99	"Jagad av sanningen"	21 December 1995	715

=== Season 8 ===
No.	Title	Original release date	Prod. code
100	"En skål för framtiden"	11 January 1996	801
Dahlén Shipping Line celebrate 100 years as shipping company. Lina Dahlén come back from U.S.A
101	"Skvallerbytta bingbång"	18 January 1996	802
102	"Generationsskifte"	25 January 1996	803
103	"Falskt spel"	1 February 1996	804
104	"Passioner och svek"	8 February 1996	805
105	"Den som gräver en grop..."	15 February 1996	806
106	"Fly för livet"	22 February 1996	807
107	"Sann kärlek?"	29 February 1996	808
108	"Om hjärtat är tomt, varför talar munnen?"	7 March 1996	809
109	"Många bäckar små"	14 March 1996	810
110	"Le mot din fiende"	21 March 1996	811
111	"Farliga rykten"	28 March 1996	812
112	"I de lugnaste vatten"	4 April 1996	813
113	"Skuggor från det förflutna"	11 April 1996	814
114	"Seger och sorg"	18 April 1996	815

=== Season 9 ===
No.	Title	Original release date	Prod. code
115	"Bröllop med förhinder"	12 September 1996	901
116	"Det svåra beslutet"	19 September 1996	902
117	"Dolda planer"	26 September 1996	903
118	"Det första steget"	3 October 1996	904
119	"Laddat möte"	10 October 1996	905
120	"Obehagliga nyheter"	17 October 1996	906
121	"Oväntat besök"	24 October 1996	907
122	"Upp till bevis"	31 October 1996	908
123	"Sanningens pris"	7 November 1996	909
124	"Farliga förbindelser"	14 November 1996	910
125	"Talande tystnad"	21 November 1996	911
126	"Obehagliga överraskningar"	28 November 1996	912
127	"Svarta tankar"	5 December 1996	913
128	"Vägval"	12 December 1996	914
129	"En annorlunda påsk"	19 December 1996	915

=== Season 10 ===
No.	Title	Original release date	Prod. code
130	"Ett nytt Freja"	9 January 1997	1001
131	"Farlig fest"	16 January 1997	1002
132	"Sista chansen"	23 January 1997	1003
133	"Vinna eller försvinna"	30 January 1997	1004
134	"Fri eller fången"	6 February 1997	1005
136	"Bakom lyckta dörrar"	20 February 1997	1007
137	"Förbjuden kärlek"	27 February 1997	1008
138	"Frågor och svar"	6 March 1997	1009
139	"Tappert försök"	13 March 1997	1010
140	"Bättre fly"	20 March 1997	1011
141	"En grop åt andra"	27 March 1997	1012
142	"Mot bättre vetande"	3 April 1997	1013
143	"Bindande bevis"	10 April 1997	1014
144	"Hela havet stormar"	17 April 1997	1015

=== Season 11 ===
No.	Title	Original release date	Prod. code
145	"Lik i lasten"	21 August 1997	1101
146	"Anonymt alibi"	28 August 1997	1102
147	"Lögner och löften"	4 September 1997	1103
148	"Farlig försoning"	11 September 1997	1104
149	"Vänner emellan"	18 September 1997	1105
150	"Kontakt sökes"	25 September 1997	1106
151	"I hastigt mod"	2 October 1997	1107
152	"Begär och belöning"	9 October 1997	1108
153	"En fråga om förtroende"	16 October 1997	1109
154	"Brott och straff"	23 October 1997	1110
155	"Hemliga tårar"	30 October 1997	1111
156	"Löst prat och håra ord"	6 November 1997	1112
157	"Svarta får"	13 November 1997	1113
The Remmer family sails into the cast
158	"Tjockare än vatten"	20 November 1997	1114
159	"Älskar, älskar inte"	27 November 1997	1115
160	"Trumf på hand"	4 December 1997	1116
161	"En skandal i societeten"	11 December 1997	1117
162	"Den förlorade sonen"	18 December 1997	1118
Pehr Silver leaves the cast and moves to Gothenburg after he has sold his ships to Katarina Remmer

=== Season 12 ===
No.	Title	Original release date	Prod. code
163	"Desperata dåd"	8 January 1998	1201
Alexandra Remmer sails into the cast
164	"Objudna gäster"	15 January 1998	1202
165	"Svek och sabotage"	22 January 1998	1203
166	"Möte med det förflutna"	29 January 1998	1204
167	"Sanning och konsekvens"	5 February 1998	1205
168	"Blodsband"	12 February 1998	1206
169	"Minnenas parad"	19 February 1998	1207
170	"Sanningens minut"	26 February 1998	1208
171	"Fånge i det förgångna"	5 March 1998	1209
172	"Freja i blåsväder"	12 March 1998	1210
Nikolaj Remlund sails into the cast after being sitting in jail in S:t Petersburg
173	"Brustna illusioner"	19 March 1998	1211
174	"Låsta positioner"	26 March 1998	1212
175	"Sov du lilla videung"	2 April 1998	1213
176	"När maskerna faller"	9 April 1998	1214
177	"Till andra sidan"	16 April 1998	1215
178	"Sova med fienden"	23 April 1998	1216
179	"Död eller levande?"	30 April 1998	1217
180	"Utan återvändo"	7 May 1998	1218

=== Season 13 ===
No.	Title	Original release date	Prod. code
181	"Kris"	20 August 1998	1301
Nina and Viktor Remmer sails into the cast
182	"Oväntad återkomst"	27 August 1998	1302
183	"I eget intresse"	3 September 1998	1303
Sofie Sjögren returns from Australia, in hope to get her father Gustav's money.
184	"Herre på täppan"	10 September 1998	1304
185	"I sista minuten"	17 September 1998	1305
Sofie Sjögren leaves the cast again and returns to Australia.
186	"Trumf på hand"	24 September 1998	1306
187	"Förbigångna"	1 October 1998	1307
188	"Övertag"	8 October 1998	1308
189	"Tid att gå vidare"	15 October 1998	1309
190	"Den nakna sanningen"	22 October 1998	1310
191	"Dilemma"	29 October 1998	1311
192	"Spelets regler"	5 November 1998	1312
193	"Larmet går"	12 November 1998	1313
194	"Kollisionskurs"	19 November 1998	1314
195	"Tro, hopp och kärlek"	26 November 1998	1315
196	"Det godas fiende"	3 December 1998	1316
197	"Som man bäddar..."	10 December 1998	1317
198	"Stormvarning"	17 December 1998	1318

=== Season 14 ===
No.	Title	Original release date	Prod. code
199	"Dansa med fienden"	14 January 1999	1401
Reidar get shot in the head by Emelie Lindberg
200	"I dödens gränsland"	21 January 1999	1402
Mikael Samuelson and Suzanne Reuter returns briefly as Rolf and Renate respectively.
201	"Villfarelser"	28 January 1999	1403
202	"På återseende"	4 February 1999	1404
203	"En ny utmaning"	11 February 1999	1405
204	"Oväntat besök"	18 February 1999	1406
205	"Kärlekens labyrinter"	25 February 1999	1407
206	"Utan fotfäste"	4 March 1999	1408
207	"Moderskärlek"	11 March 1999	1409
208	"Dunkla motiv"	18 March 1999	1410
209	"Falska förbindelser"	25 March 1999	1411
210	"Rött kort"	1 April 1999	1412
211	"Nya vänner, nya fiender"	8 April 1999	1413
212	"Tro, hopp och kärlek"	15 April 1999	1414
213	"Glömda minnen"	22 April 1999	1415
214	"Svikna förtroenden"	29 April 1999	1416
215	"Fångad av kärlek"	6 May 1999	1417
216	"Den som gapar över mycket"	13 May 1999	1418
The episode end with an explosion in a house and nobody knows if Carl Ericson, Alexandra Remmer and Emelie Lindberg survived it.

=== Season 15 ===
No.	Title	Original release date	Prod. code
217	"I krisens spår"	26 August 1999	1501
218	"Övergiven"	2 September 1999	1502
219	"Med ont uppsåt"	9 September 1999	1503
Kenneth Söderman leaves the cast as Tony Sjögren temporary because he get closed in a container to Indien by Victor Remmer.
220	"Besvikelser"	16 September 1999	1504
221	"Pappa vet bäst"	23 September 1999	1505
222	"I svartsjukans klor"	30 September 1999	1506
223	"Sviken"	7 October 1999	1507
224	"Dilemma"	14 October 1999	1508
225	"Nakna nerver"	21 October 1999	1509
226	"Agnar från vete"	28 October 1999	1510
227	"Upp, upp och iväg"	4 November 1999	1511
228	"Lite extra krydda"	11 November 1999	1512
229	"Vedergällning"	18 November 1999	1513
230	"Skynda långsamt"	25 November 1999	1514
231	"Måttet är rågat"	2 December 1999	1515
232	"Natten går tunga fjät"	9 December 1999	1516
233	"Da'n före da'n"	16 December 1999	1517
234	"God jul"	23 December 1999	1518
Viktor Remmer leaves the cast when he dies of a scorpionbiting

=== Season 16 ===
No.	Title	Original release date	Prod. code
235	"När de döda vaknar"	13 January 2000	1601
Tony came back after being gone in about 9 months.
236	"Outgrundliga äro Herrens vägar"	20 January 2000	1602
237	"Flaggan i topp"	27 January 2000	1603
238	"Familjelycka"	3 February 2000	1604
239	"Som en blixt från en klar himmel"	10 February 2000	1605
240	"Drottning utan tron"	17 February 2000	1606
241	"Avslöjanden"	24 February 2000	1607
242	"Missförstånd"	2 March 2000	1608
243	"Stormvarning"	9 March 2000	1609
244	"Svart guld"	16 March 2000	1610
245	"Som ett brev på posten"	23 March 2000	1611
246	"Halloween"	30 March 2000	1612
247	"Gammal kärlek rostar aldrig"	6 April 2000	1613
248	"Saknadens röst"	13 April 2000	1614
249	"Snaran dras åt"	20 April 2000	1615
250	"På lösan sand"	27 April 2000	1616
251	"Striptease"	4 May 2000	1617
252	"Uppbrott"	11 May 2000	1618

Note: Four days after the end of season 16, Gösta Prüzelius died. But his character Reidar Dahlén appeared in season 17 as well, because SVT had had time to record it before Gösta's death.

=== Season 17 ===
No.	Title	Original release date	Prod. code
253	"Vägen tillbaka"	24 August 2000	1701
254	"Etik och moral"	31 August 2000	1702
255	"Frihetens pris"	7 September 2000	1703
256	"Kärlekens irrvägar"	14 September 2000	1704
257	"Döttrar och söner"	21 September 2000	1705
258	"Clownskräck"	28 September 2000	1706
259	"Hårt mot hårt"	5 October 2000	1707
260	"Egna beslut och andras"	12 October 2000	1708
261	"Under ytan"	19 October 2000	1709
262	"Sjukdom och saknad"	26 October 2000	1710
263	"Överraskningar"	2 November 2000	1711
264	"Blodsbröder"	9 November 2000	1712
265	"Hämnden"	16 November 2000	1713
Reidar leaves the cast and travels to Spain
266	"Fool for love"	23 November 2000	1714
267	"Blod är tjockare än vatten"	30 November 2000	1715
268	"Bedragen"	7 December 2000	1716
269	"En plan växer fram"	14 December 2000	1717
270	"I nöd och lust"	21 December 2000	1718

=== Season 18 ===
No.	Title	Original release date	Prod. code
271	"Nya tider"	11 January 2001	1801
Reidar is dead and buried. Carl has left the cast after being put in on mentalhospital. Tony is at hospital after the fire
272	"Freja i hamn"	18 January 2001	1802
273	"Uno-dagen"	25 January 2001	1803
274	"Arvsskifte"	1 February 2001	1804
275	"Redarbal och Knegarbal"	8 February 2001	1805
276	"Baksmälla"	15 February 2001	1806
277	"Djupt vatten"	22 February 2001	1807
278	"Med sanningen i hälarna"	1 March 2001	1808
279	"Lögnens rätta ansikte"	8 March 2001	1809
280	"Apgryta"	15 March 2001	1810
281	"Dåliga vibrationer"	22 March 2001	1811
282	"Ingen patentlösning"	29 March 2001	1812
283	"Ombytta roller"	5 April 2001	1813
284	"Ingen återvändo"	12 April 2001	1814
285	"The Lost Son"	19 April 2001	1815
286	"Tillbaka från de döda"	26 April 2001	1816
287	"Sveket"	3 May 2001	1817
288	"Såsom i en spegel"	10 May 2001	1818

=== Season 19 ===
No.	Title	Original release date	Prod. code
289	"Omstart"	23 August 2001	1901
290	"Hämnden är ljuv"	30 August 2001	1902
291	"Vinna eller försvinna"	6 September 2001	1903
292	"Fri men ändå fånge"	13 September 2001	1904
293	"Smugglaren som slank ur nätet"	20 September 2001	1905
294	"Världsrekord"	27 September 2001	1906
295	"Ur Funktion"	4 October 2001	1907
296	"Salt, lögner och vänskapsband"	11 October 2001	1908
297	"April April"	18 October 2001	1909
298	"Falska Vänner"	25 October 2001	1910
299	"Wild Wild East"	1 November 2001	1911
300	"Den sista färden?"	8 November 2001	1912
Mikael Samuelson returns briefly as Rolf Dahlén.
301	"Dödens skepp"	15 November 2001	1913
302	"Dokusoppa"	22 November 2001	1914
303	"Slå mig med din rytmpinne"	29 November 2001	1915
304	"Risky Business"	6 December 2001	1916
305	"Dyra Dollar"	13 December 2001	1917
306	"Skymning"	20 December 2001	1918

=== Season 20 ===
No.	Title	Original release date	Prod. code
307	"Nya allianser"	31 January 2002	2001
Björn Lindman returns to the show after a long time in jail.
308	"Bistra besked"	7 February 2002	2002
309	"Den gråtande clownen"	14 February 2002	2003
310	"Skumpa, sex och solkigt samvete"	21 February 2002	2004
311	"Sanitas per aqua"	28 February 2002	2005
312	"Vild strejk"	7 March 2002	2006
313	"Blod och champagne"	14 March 2002	2007
Pehr Silver and Henrik Bjurhed returns for this episode.
314	"Nice try"	21 March 2002	2008
315	"Panik på alla plan"	28 March 2002	2009
316	"Så länge skutan kan gå"	4 April 2002	2010
317	"Nära Slutet"	11 April 2002	2011
318	"Med flaggan i topp"	18 April 2002	2012
