= Östgöta Theatre =

Theatre organisation in Sweden

Coordinates: 58.5941564085649°N 16.182496014451203°E

- Östgötateatern
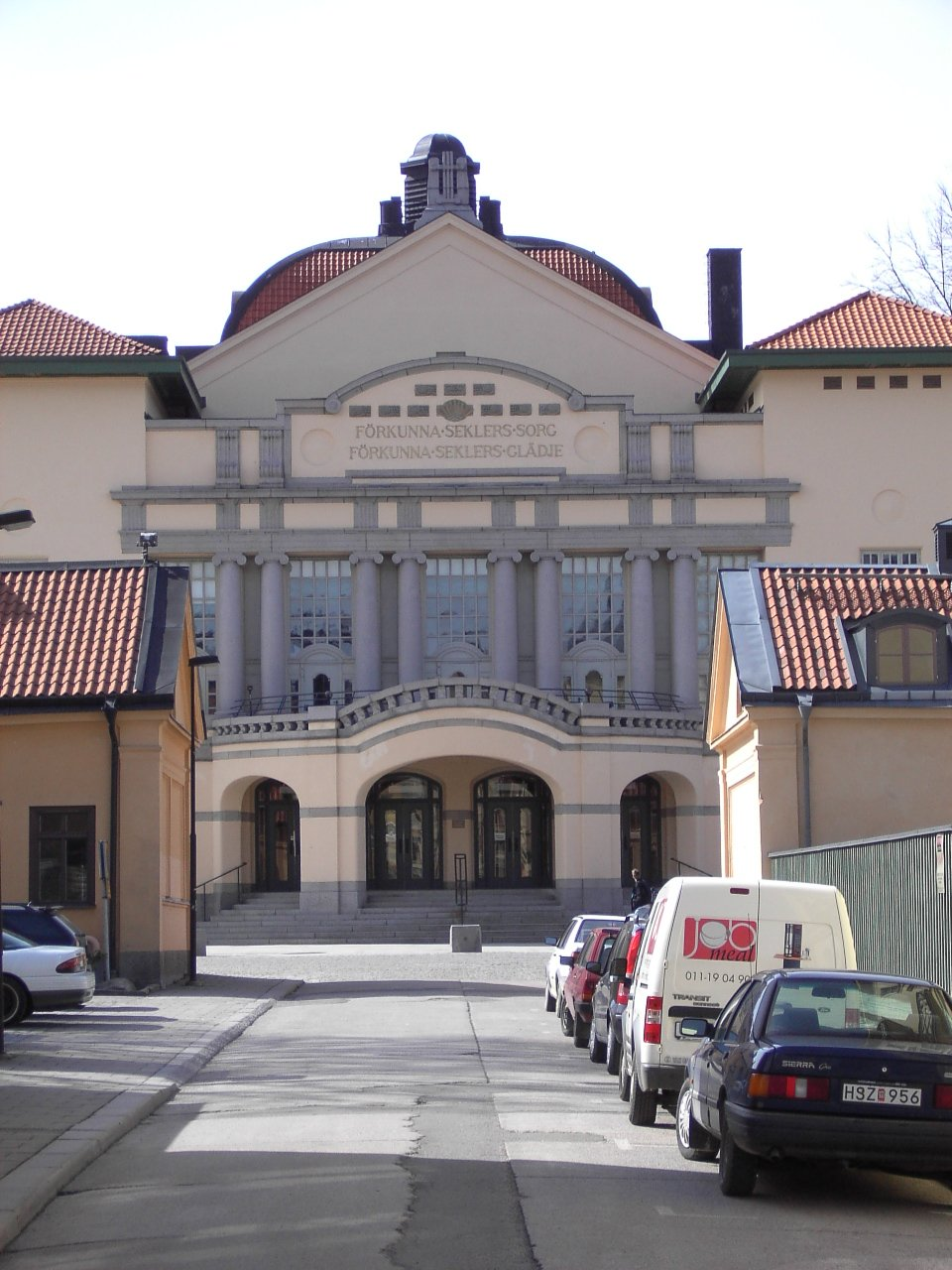
- Old Theatre in Norrköping
- Formation: 1981
- Type: Performing arts
- Purpose: Proclaim the sorrow of the ages - Proclaim the joy of the ages
- Locations: Norrköping, Sweden; Linköping, Sweden
- Region served: Östergötland
- Owner: Östergötland Regional Council and municipalities of Norrköping and Linköping
- President: Lars Hagman
- Chief Executive: Pia Kronqvist
- Manager: Nils Poletti
- Parent organization: Scenkonst Öst AB
- Website: www.ostgotateatern.se

The Östgöta Theatre (Swedish: Östgötateatern) is Sweden's largest regional theatre. The repertoire includes Swedish and foreign drama, new plays, musicals, and classical theatre.

Since 2010, the theatre has staged the European premiere of The Addams Family and the Scandinavian premieres of Come from Away and the musical Amélie.

== Venues ==
Östgöta Theatre operates two venues – Stora teatern in Norrköping with a seating capacity for 600 people and Stora teatern in Linköping with a seating capacity for 388. It also does tours to other locations.

== History ==
The theatre in Linköping was opened in 1903, while the one in Norrköping, which is slightly larger, was opened in 1908 and is in the Art Nouveau style. On its front is the motto "Proclaim the sorrow of the ages - Proclaim the joy of the ages". Both are now called Stora teatern, or the Grand Theatre, and were designed by Axel Anderberg.

The present-day combination has its origins in the Stadsteatern Norrköping-Linköping, established in 1947. The Östergötland County Theatre Foundation was established in 1981 and took over from it.

Since 1 January 2016, the theatrical organization has been combined with the Norrköping Symphony Orchestra into a public collective now called Scenkonst Öst AB. The owners are the Regional Council and the municipalities of Norrköping and Linköping.

== Notable productions ==
- Come from Away (musical), from 26 September 2020, in Norrköping

== Notable people ==
- Gun Jönsson (1929–2021), theatre director 1978–1980
- Bo Höglund (born 1948), member of the company
- Inger Nilsson (born 1959), property master
- Lars-Erik Liedholm (1928–1996), theatre director
- Richard Carlsohn (born 1965), member of the company
