= Graffman =

Graffman is a surname. Notable people with the surname include:

- Gary Graffman (1928–2025), American classical pianist
- Göran Graffman (1931–2014), Swedish actor and film director
