= NMNH (disambiguation) =

The National Museum of Natural History (NMNH) is a museum in Washington, D.C.

NMNH may also refer to:

- National Museum of Natural History, New Delhi
- Naranjo Museum of Natural History, in Lufkin, Texas

== See also ==
- National Museum of Natural History (disambiguation)
