= Stora teatern, Linköping =

Theatre venue in Sweden

Stora teatern, Linköping The Grand Theatre of Linköping
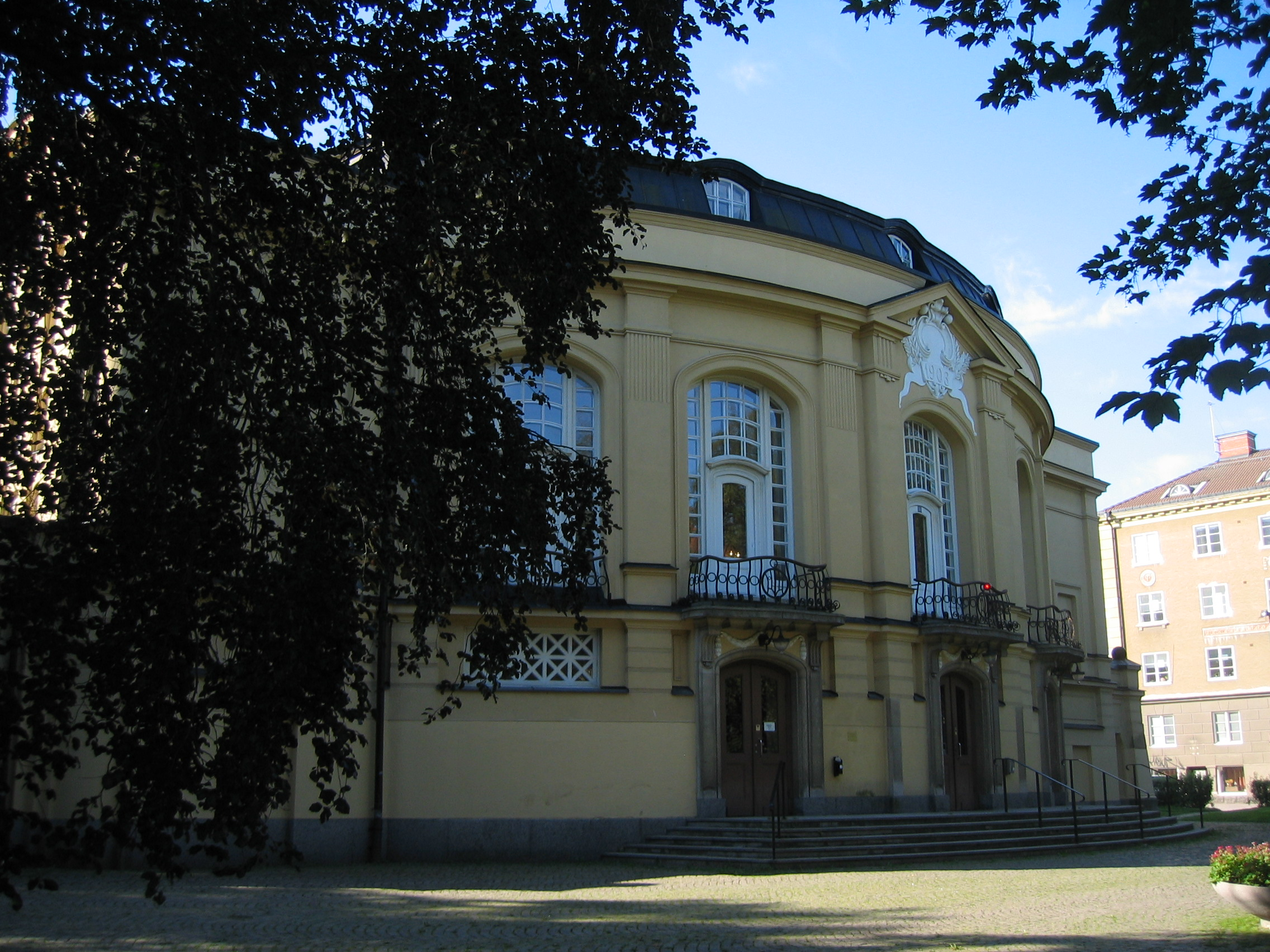
- Linköping's theatre
- Interactive map of Stora teatern, Linköping; The Grand Theatre of Linköping
- Address: Linköping; Sweden
- Coordinates: 58°24′50″N 15°37′09″E
- Owner: Östgöta Theatre
- Capacity: 388

Construction
- Opened: 1903 Dec 18
- Architect: Axel Anderberg

Stora teatern (The Grand Theatre in Swedish) is an event venue in Linköping, Sweden. It was initially built as a theatre venue and inaugurated on December 18, 1903.

The building was designed in Art Nouveau style by Axel Anderberg. Stora teatern is run and managed by Östgöta Theatre which has another venue in Norrköping.

During the 1980s, the theater building was renovated both inside and out. At that time, the audience foyer on the first row was completely rebuilt and is now a bright, open room with parquet floors and beautiful Art Nouveau windows on the arched wall facing the park outside. Stora teatern has seating capacity for 388 guests.

== Gallery ==
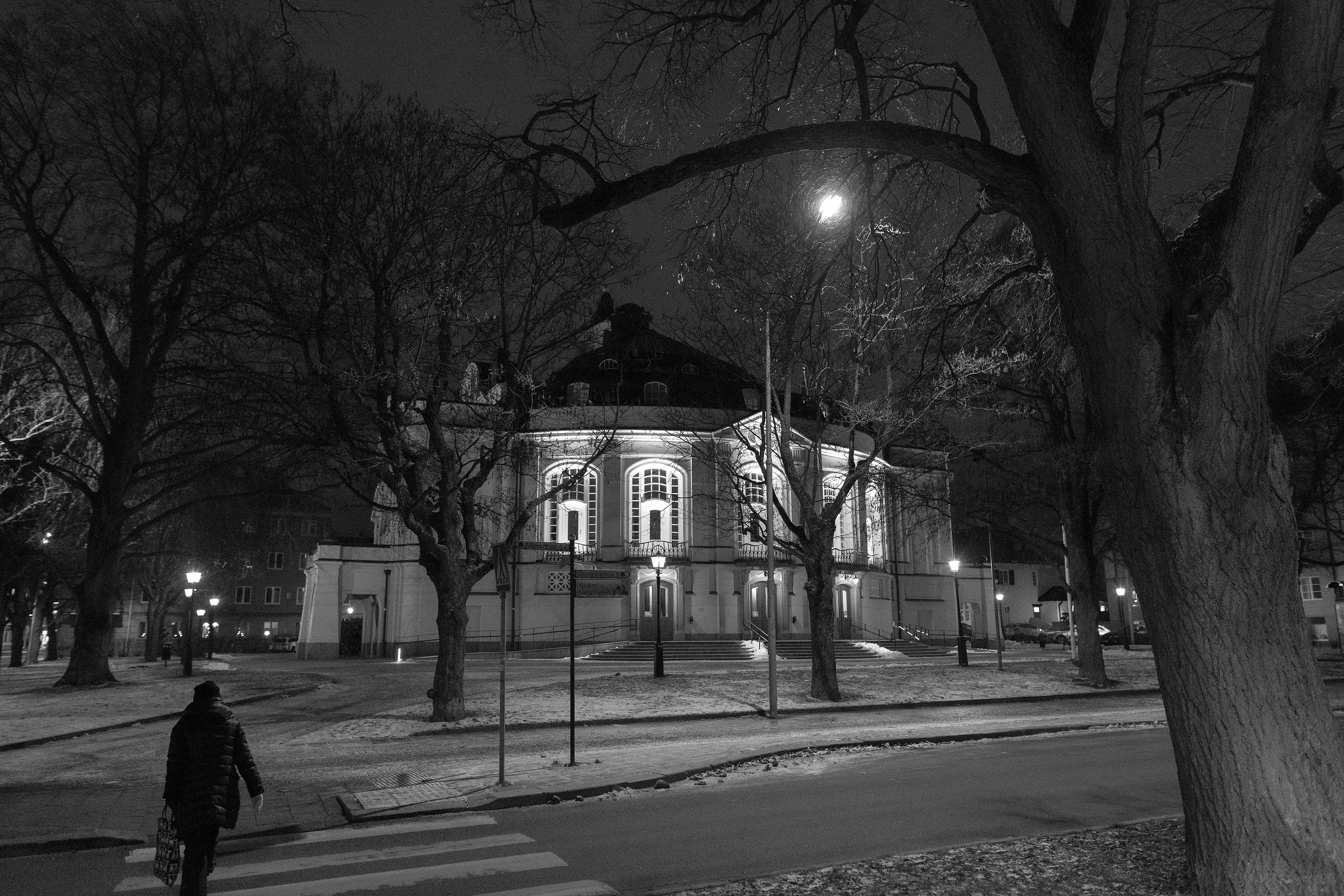
Theatre building at night
