= Madicken på Junibacken =

- Directed by: Göran Graffman
- Screenplay by: Astrid Lindgren
- Produced by: Olle Hellbom; Olle Nordemar
- Starring: Jonna Liljendahl
- Cinematography: Jörgen Persson
- Music by: Bengt Hallberg
- Distributed by: AB Svensk Filmindustri
- Release date: 18 October 1980 (Sweden)
- Running time: 82 minutes
- Country: Sweden
- Language: Swedish

Madicken på Junibacken is a 1980 Swedish film about the Astrid Lindgren character Madicken, directed by Göran Graffman.

== Cast ==
- Jonna Liljendahl as Margareta "Madicken" Engström
- Liv Alsterlund as Lisabet
- Monica Nordquist as Kajsa
- Björn Granath as Jonas
- Lis Nilheim as Alva
- Birgitta Andersson as Emma Nilsson
- Allan Edwall as Emil P. Nilsson
- Sebastian Håkansson as Abbe Nilsson
- Kerstin Hansson as Mia
