= 16th Guldbagge Awards =

Annual Swedish film awards ceremony

- Date: 22 September 1980
- Site: Grand Hotel, Stockholm, Sweden

Highlights
- Best Picture: To Be a Millionaire

The 16th Guldbagge Awards ceremony, presented by the Swedish Film Institute, honored the best Swedish films of 1979 and 1980, and took place on 22 September 1980. To Be a Millionaire directed by Mats Arehn was presented with the award for Best Film. The awards for Best Director and Best Actress were not presented.

== Awards ==
- Best Film: To Be a Millionaire by Mats Arehn
- Best Director: not awarded
- Best Actor: Peter Lindgren for I Am Maria
- Best Actress: not awarded
- The Ingmar Bergman Award: Lena Olin
