= Ingrid Bergman: In Her Own Words =

2015 film

Ingrid Bergman In Her Own Words
- Film poster
- Directed by: Stig Björkman
- Written by: Stig Björkman; Stina Gardell; Dominika Daubenbuchel
- Produced by: Stina Gardell
- Cinematography: Malin Korkeasalo; Eva Dahlgren
- Edited by: Dominika Daubenbuchel
- Music by: Michael Nyman; Eva Dahlgren
- Release dates: 19 May 2015 (Cannes); 28 August 2015 (Sweden)
- Running time: 114 minutes
- Country: Sweden
- Language: Swedish

Ingrid Bergman: In Her Own Words (Swedish: Jag är Ingrid, lit. 'I am Ingrid') is a 2015 Swedish documentary film about Ingrid Bergman directed by Stig Björkman. It was screened in the Cannes Classics section at the 2015 Cannes Film Festival where it received a special mention for L'Œil d'or.

== Cast ==
- Alicia Vikander as Ingrid Bergman (voice, Swedish version)
- Melinda Kinnaman as Ingrid Bergman (voice, English version)
- Jeanine Basinger as herself
- Pia Lindström as herself
- Fiorella Mariani as herself
- Ingrid Rossellini as herself
- Isabella Rossellini as herself
- Roberto Ingmar Rossellini as himself
- Liv Ullmann as herself
- Sigourney Weaver as herself

== Release ==
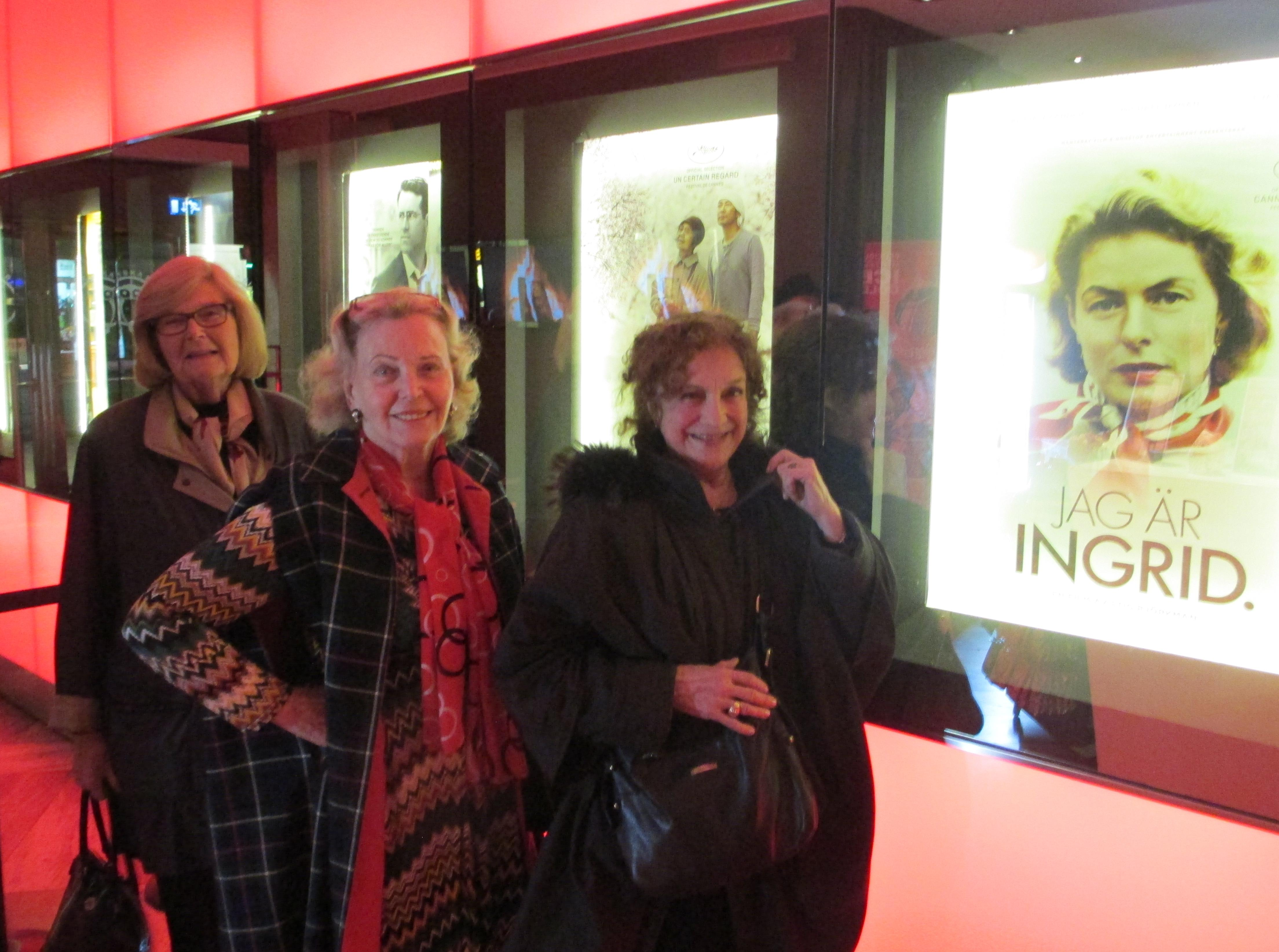
Ulla Jerstav Riese, Marianne Bernadotte and Gunvor Pontén after a screening of Jag är Ingrid in Stockholm (2015)

The film had its world premiere at the Cannes Film Festival on 19 May 2015. The film was selected to screen at the Jerusalem Film Festival on 12 July 2015. The film had its North American premiere at the New York Film Festival. The film was released in Sweden on 28 August 2015. On 27 August 2015, the film was acquired by Rialto Pictures and set the film for a 13 November 2015, limited release, in the United States.

== Awards ==
At the 2015 Vancouver International Film Festival, the film won the award for Most Popular International Documentary, based on audience balloting.

== Home media ==
Ingrid Bergman: In Her Own Words has been released on Blu-ray and DVD by The Criterion Collection.
