= Trier on von Trier =

1999 book by Stig Björkman

- Author: Stig Björkman
- Original title: Trier om von Trier
- Translator: Neil Smith
- Language: Swedish
- Genre: interviews
- Publisher: Alfabeta bokförlag
- Publication date: 1999
- Publication place: Sweden
- English publication date: 2003
- Pages: 240
- ISBN: 9177127501

Trier on von Trier (Swedish: Trier om von Trier) is a 1999 book by the Swedish journalist and filmmaker Stig Björkman. It consists of a series of interviews with the Danish filmmaker Lars von Trier. The content goes into Trier and his work in roughly chronological order, beginning with his childhood and covering his films from the 1980s and 1990s, notably the Europa trilogy and Golden Heart trilogy. Faber & Faber published the book's English translation in 2003.

== See also ==
- Hawks on Hawks
- Lynch on Lynch
