= Rederiet =

Swedish television series from 1992–2002

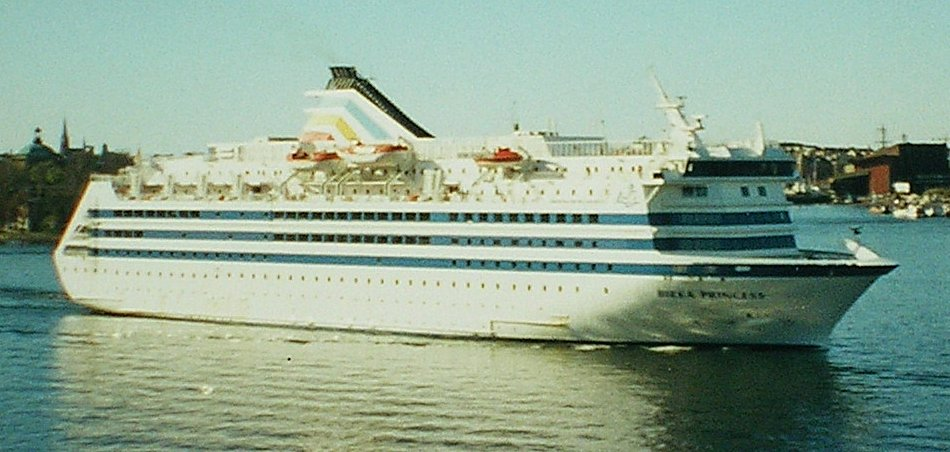
- MS Birka Princess portrayed the fictional MS Freja in Rederiet
- Genre: Drama
- Created by: Louise Boije af Gennäs; Peter Emanuel Falck
- Directed by: Filippa Wallström; Marcelo Racana; Christian Wikander; Thomas Hellberg
- Starring: Gösta Prüzelius; Johannes Brost; Kenneth Söderman; Hans V. Engström; Bert-Åke Varg; Gaby Stenberg; Bengt Bauler; Thomas Hellberg; Peter Harryson; Mikael Samuelson; Suzanne Reuter; Per Holmberg; Gösta Krantz
- Theme music composer: Anders Neglin
- Country of origin: Sweden
- Original language: Swedish
- No. of seasons: 20
- No. of episodes: 318 (list of episodes)

Production
- Running time: 45 min

Original release
- Network: SVT
- Release: 20 August 1992 – 18 April 2002

Rederiet (High Seas or The Shipping Company) was a (318 episodes) Swedish soap opera that aired on Sveriges Television between August 1992 and April 2002. The cast featured many popular and renowned Swedish actors.

The 45-minute episodes were broadcast weekly on Thursday nights on the public-service channel SVT1 and normally had between one and two million viewers. For ten years, Rederiet was the number-one rated show on Swedish television, along with the rival TV4 show Tre Kronor. The competition for viewers can be compared to that between Dynasty and Dallas.

Rederiet also gained popularity in Finland on Yle TV2, and the show was a hit in Norway too on TV2. The first season of the show was also sold to Egypt. The later seasons of the series were produced in collaboration with YLE, which led most notably to Finnish actor Åke Lindman appearing in the series. Rapper Ken Ring also appeared as an extra in the show in 1996.

Rederiet became the first TV-series in Sweden to show a kiss between two homosexual characters, the kiss scene received attention in media.

On April Fools' Day 1993 SVT News announced that Mel Gibson was to play a lead role in the series. Gibson himself was interviewed and confirmed the information. It was later revealed that the whole event had been a joke.

== Plot ==
The story is about a shipping company which conducts cruiseferry traffic on the Baltic Sea between Stockholm, Sweden and Turku, Finland. It takes place on board MS Freja, the exterior of which was portrayed in the series by the Finnish registered MS Birka Princess. In the series the ship has different funnel colours from the ones in real life; in reality they were blue, yellow and red but in the series they were retouched to appear as different shades of blue. The show follows life on board the ship, mostly focusing on the crew and captain, but also on some of the passengers. The plot often involves love, breakups, accidents, deaths, murders, smuggling, theft, arson, rape, drugs, and insanity.

Another part of the story takes place on land, following the life of the Dahléns, the family who owns and runs the shipping company. There are also rival companies who try to gain control over the company, which leads to a constant struggle for power.

== Characters ==
Here is a list of the characters in Rederiet:

Actors	Character	Season
Gösta Prüzelius	Reidar Dahlén	1992 - 2000
Gaby Stenberg	Elinor Dahlén/Beatrice Dahlén	1992/1994-2002
Mikael Samuelson	Rolf Dahlén	1992 - 1993
Suzanne Reuter	Renate Dahlén	1992 - 1994
Gunilla Paulsen	Rebecca Dahlén	1992 - 1993, 1994, 2001 - 2002
Lena Strömdahl	Yvonne Dahlén	1992 - 1996
Louise Belfrage/Sara Alström	Lina Dahlén	1992 - 1993, 1996 - 1997
Emil Boss / Måns Nathanaelson	Reidar Dahlén Jr "Junior"	1992 - 1995/1995 - 1997
Bengt Bauler	Carl Ericson	1994 - 2000, 2002
Bert-Åke Varg	Gustav Sjögren	1992 - 2002
Wallis Grahn	Gerd Sjögren	1992 - 1993
Angelica Rubertson	Sofie Sjögren	1992 - 1994, 1998
Kenneth Söderman	Tony Sjögren	1992 - 2002
Margaretha Byström	Katarina Remmer	1997 - 2002
Patrik Bergner	Nikolaj Remlund	1998 - 2002
Lotta Karlge	Anja Remmer	2000 - 2002
Johan H:son Kjellgren	Viktor Remmer	1998 - 1999
Carina Lidbom	Alexandra Remmer	1998 - 2001
Marie Robertson	Nina Remmer	1998 - 2001
Mikaela Ramel	Eva "Angelique" Wiik/Roberts/Remmer	1999 - 2000, 2002
Tommy Nilson	Ivan Remmer	1997
Anders Ahlbom	Yngve Almkvist	1992 - 1993
Anders Beckman	Günther Kraft	1994
Anders Larsson	Malte Eriksson	1994 - 2001
Anita Wall	Elisabeth Lerwacht	1993 - 1994
Anna-Maria Samuelsson Käll	Emelie Lindberg	1998 - 2000
Bojan Westin	Barbro Pastorelli	1995 - 1996
Cecilia Ljung	Peggy Svensson	1994
Claes Ljungmark	Joel Hagberg	1994 - 1995, 1996
Duncan Green	Peter Henson	2000-2002
Dan Ekborg	Kaj Öhman	2002
Daniel Gustavsson	Mattias Andersson	2001 - 2002
Daniel Sjöberg	Thomas Nilsson	1992 - 1993
Erik Kiviniemi	Jussi Tola	1993 - 1994, 2001
Erika Höghede	Karin Bergström/Anna Lindell	2000 - 2002
Eva Bysing	Irma Larsson/Nilsson	1992 - 1996
Sofia Helin	Minna Lager	1996, 1998
Ewa Carlsson	Margareta Lundqvist/Lager/Hammar	1996 - 2001
Pia Green	Sara Torstensson	1993 - 1994
Göran Gillinger	Robert "Raspen" Torstensson	1993 - 1994
Hans V. Engström	Uno Kronkvist	1992 - 2002
Helena Grossi	Lisa Axelsson	1992 - 1993
Ingar Sigvardsdotter	Jessica Strömberg	2000
Ingela Olsson	Gisela Kunze	1993
Helena af Sandeberg	Louise Calling	1997-1998
Jessica Liedberg	Stina Björklund	2002
Johannes Brost	Torbjörn "Joker" Jonasson	1992 - 2002
Annmari Kastrup	Anki Jonasson	1996-1998
Jonas Bergström	Haakon Andersson	1993
Josephine Bornebusch	Madeleine Boisse de Blaque	1999
Kaija Kärkinen	Pirjo Koskinen	1992, 1994
Karin Bjurström	Jeanette Wester	1996 - 1998
Karl Dyall	Emilio Bolivar	1994 - 1995
Kim Anderzon	Siv Svensson	1994 - 1996, 2002
Krister Henriksson	Björn Lindman	1992 - 1993, 2002
Lars Lind	Anders Moberg	1999 - 2000
Lennart R. Svensson	Tom Hansson	1992
Linda Lundmark	Eva-Lotta	2001 - 2002
Linus Wahlgren	Filip "FN" Norberg	1996 - 1999
Lo Wahl	Karin "KåKå" Karlsson	1993 - 1995
Lotta Ramel	Diana Nordin	1995
Magnus Roosmann	Fredrik Westberg	1999
Malin Berghagen Nilsson	Paula Svensson	1994, 2002
Marie Chantal-Long	Irina Gornitzka-Jonasson	1992, 1993 -1994
Martin Forsström	Felix Svensson	1995 - 1997
Meg Westergren	Desirée Lindman	1994 - 1995
Mikael Persbrandt	Ola Simonsson	1992 - 1993, 1994
Minna Treutiger	Tilda Lyksell	2001
My Bodell	Elin Hagberg	1995 - 1996
Ola Forssmed	Micki Sandell	1996 - 2002
Per Graffman	Joe Gardner	2000 - 2001
Per Holmberg	Henrik Bjurhed	1992 - 1996, 2002
Per Morberg	Viggo Strieber	1994 - 1995
Per Myrberg	Robert Boisse de Blaque	1999, 2000
Peter Harryson	Pehr Silver	1994 - 1997, 2000, 2002
Peter Perski	Magnus Glantz	2001 - 2002
Yvonne Schaloske	Vera Bengtsson	1996, 1997 - 2002
Gerhard Hoberstorfer	Tor "Totte" Bengtsson	1997 - 1998, 2002
Ray Jones IV	Jesper Haglund	1999 - 2001
Regina Lund	Mona Kjellgren	1994 - 1995, 2001
Rikard Bergqvist	Stefan Holmberg	2000-2002
Sten Ljunggren	Torkel Jonasson	1993-2001
Stina Rautelin	Andrea Melin	1998 - 2000
Therese Akraka	Bella Lindgren	1996 - 1997, 2000
Thomas Hellberg	Georg Lager	1995 - 1998
Tom Deutgen	Jan-Erik "Janke" Nilsson	1992, 1994
Yngve Gåsøy	Erik Mattson	1996-1997
Yvonne Lombard	Sonja Jonasson	1993-2001
Mats Långbacka	Olof Hammar	2000
Gösta Krantz	Hans Schneider	1996-1997
Åke Lindman	Torsten Jansson	1998 - 1999

== Impact on popular culture ==
On 1 April 2018, the Swedish Star Trek fansite "Star Trek databas" announced, as an April Fool, that CBS had confirmed the series to be set in the same primary fictional universe as Star Trek, and that because of the major costs for a space opera series, the setting was instead changed to a seafaring ship on Earth.

== See also ==
- List of Rederiet episodes
