= Julia Hede =

Photographer and actor

Anna Julia Hede Wilkens
- Born: February 16, 1962 (age 64); Sweden
- Education: Dramatiska Institutet (1986–1989)
- Occupations: Film director, photographer, teacher, former child actress
- Employer: Täby Enskilda Gymnasium
- Known for: Role as Fia in Den vita stenen (1973)
- Notable work: Nyfiken (TV program); Curiosos (TV Nord)

Anna Julia Hede Wilkens (born 16 February 1962) is a Swedish film director, photographer and former child actress, well known for her role as Fia in Den vita stenen (1973 TV series). In 1986–89, she studied at Dramatiska Institutet. Now she works as teacher at Täby Enskilda gymnasium. She hosts the TV program Nyfiken.

Hede Wilkens has worked since 2015 as a teacher of television production and French at Täby Enskilda Gymnasium secondary school. She hosts the television program Curiosos, which is given on the TV channel TV Nord and filmed in the television studio at Täby Enskilda Gymnasium school.

== References and sources ==
- Lönen för Vita stenen: 0 kronor
- Julia Hede
