= Den vita stenen =

Novel by Gunnel Linde

- Author: Gunnel Linde
- Language: Swedish
- Genre: children
- Set in: Sweden
- Published: 1964
- Publication place: Sweden

Den vita stenen ("The White Stone") is a 1964 Swedish children's book written by Gunnel Linde. In 1965, Linde received the Nils Holgersson Plaque for this book. In 1973, a TV version of the story was produced.

== Plot ==
The book takes place in a village in the Swedish countryside during the 1930s. Fia and her mother Mrs Pettersson, a piano teacher, live in the big house of the village's "häradshövding" (a countryside local judge/lawspeaker), where the bad-tempered housekeeper Malin lives. People say bad things about Mrs Pettersson because she is useless and lazy as she just plays piano. Fia always gets teased by her school mates because she has a useless mother who is a piano teacher in their school.

One summer day, a boy called Hampus comes to the village together with his stepparents, his uncle who is a poor shoemaker and his wife, and their 6 children. The shoemaker's wife and her children think Hampus is stupid as he "always makes trouble and makes them move house" as they have changed home often. When Hampus and Fia meet, they don't want to say their real names. The two children, who are alienated, start their own fraternity and call themselves "Fideli" (Fia) and "Farornas konung" ("King of the Dangers", Hampus). They "fight" for a white stone and order each other on "missions": "when you have completed the "mission" you'll get the stone".

== TV series ==
In 1973 a TV series with 13 parts, directed by Göran Graffman, based on the book, was produced.

=== Cast ===
- Julia Hede as Ina Vendela Sofia "Fia" Pettersson
- Ulf Hasseltorp as Hampus
- Monica Nordquist as Mrs Pettersson
- Ulf Johanson as the "häradshövding" (judge)
- Betty Tuvén as Malin
- Håkan Serner as Sivert Kolmodin, shoemaker, Hampus' uncle and stepfather
- Maj-Britt Lindholm as Mrs Kolmodin
- Ingemar Hasselquist as Henning Kolmodin, the shoemaker's eldest child
- Cecilia Nilsson as Eivor Kolmodin, the shoemaker's daughter
- Gunilla Söderholm as Siri Kolmodin, the shoemaker's daughter
- Ann-Charlotte Lithman as Nanna Kolmodin, the shoemaker's daughter
- Joakim Rundberg as Ture Kolmodin, the shoemaker's son
- Robert Rundberg as Lulle Kolmodin, the shoemaker's son
- Fanny Gjörup as Brita
- Eva Dahlqvist as Essy
- Pia Skagermark as Solbritt
- Börje Mellvig as merchant
- Björn Gustafson as baker Emilsson
- Lars-Erik Liedholm as postmaster, Brita's father
- Ove Tjernberg as "Farornas Konung", lion tamer at circus
- Willy Peters as doctor
- Karin Miller as schoolteacher
