= I Am Maria =

1979 film

- Directed by: Karsten Wedel
- Written by: Hans-Eric Hellberg; Göran Setterberg; Karsten Wedel
- Produced by: Hans Iveberg
- Starring: Lise-Lotte Hjelm
- Cinematography: Rune Ericson
- Release date: 15 December 1979
- Running time: 94 minutes
- Country: Sweden
- Language: Swedish

I Am Maria (Swedish: Jag är Maria) is a 1979 Swedish drama film directed by Karsten Wedel. Peter Lindgren won the award for Best Actor at the 16th Guldbagge Awards.

== Cast ==
- Lise-Lotte Hjelm as Maria
- Peter Lindgren as Jon
- Helena Brodin as Maj-Britt
- Frej Lindqvist as Lennart
- Claire Wikholm as Maria's Mother
- Anita Ekström as Anna
- Malin Åman as Pia
- Stig Engström as Sixten
- Bodil Mårtensson as Ulla
- Per Flygare as Teacher
