= Cosmonova =

IMAX Dome cinema and planetarium in Sweden

Coordinates: 59.3687°N 18.0544°E

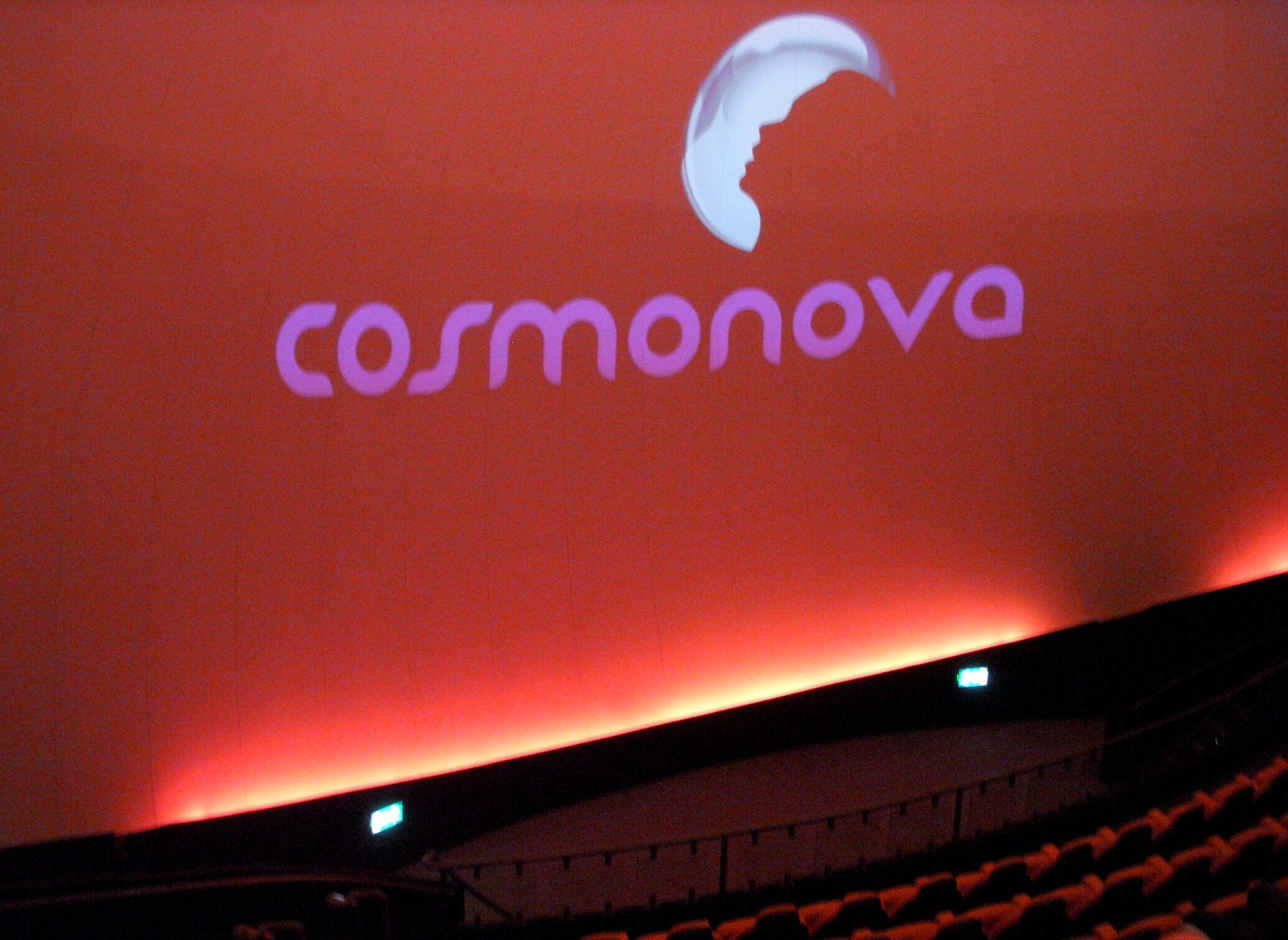
Cosmonova logo

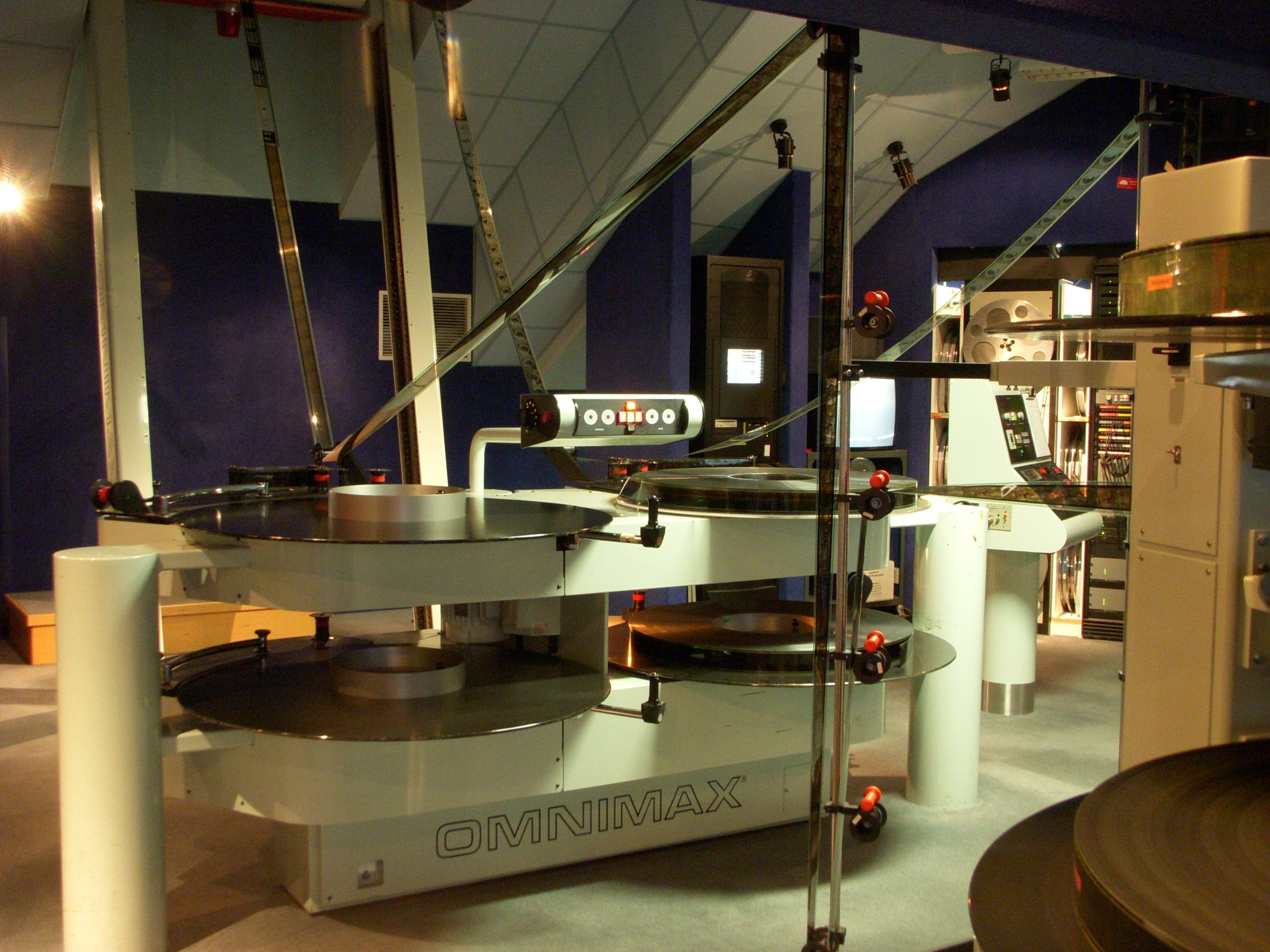
The IMAX Dome 1570 film projector in Cosmonova's control room

Cosmonova is an IMAX Dome cinema and planetarium located in an annex of the Swedish Museum of Natural History in Stockholm, Sweden. Cosmonova premiered over three nights starting on 13 October 1992, with the first public showing on 16 October. It was the first ever dedicated IMAX installation in Sweden (and third in the Nordic countries after Tietomaa Science Centre in Oulu, Finland and Tycho Brahe Planetarium in Copenhagen, Denmark) and is also the largest planetarium in Sweden.
