= Swedish Museum of Natural History =

Museum in Stockholm, Sweden

Coordinates: 59°22′08″N 18°03′13″E

Naturhistoriska riksmuseet

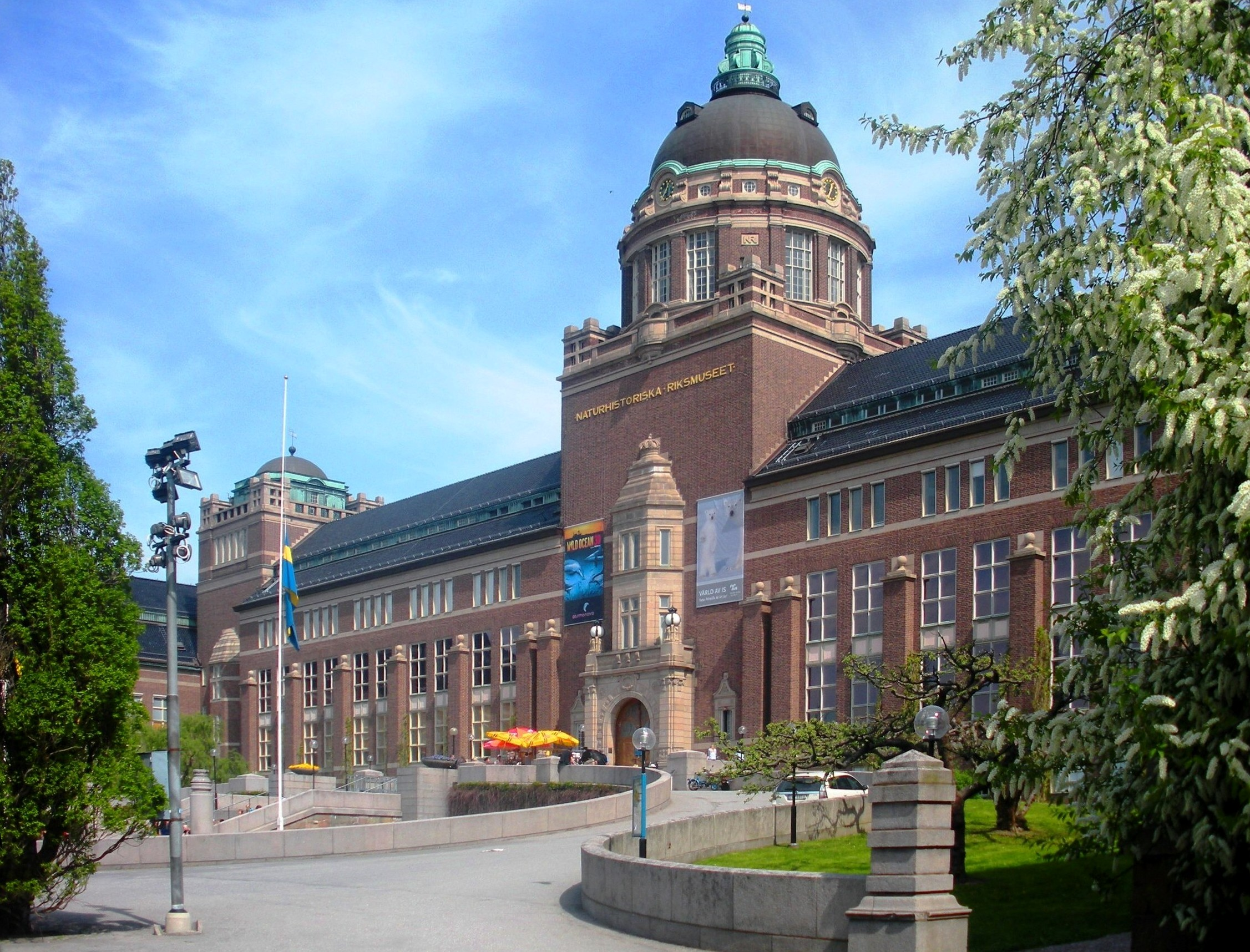
- The Swedish Museum of Natural History
- Interactive map of the Naturhistoriska riksmuseet area

General information
- Location: Stockholm, Sweden
- Completed: 1916

Design and construction
- Architect: Axel Anderberg

Website
- www.nrm.se

The Swedish Museum of Natural History (Swedish: Naturhistoriska Riksmuseet, lit. 'National Museum of Natural History'), in Stockholm, is one of two major museums of natural history in Sweden, the other one being located in Gothenburg.

The museum was founded in 1819 by the Royal Swedish Academy of Sciences, but goes back to the collections acquired mostly through donations by the academy since its foundation in 1739. These collections had first been made available to the public in 1786. The museum was separated from the Academy in 1965.

One of the keepers of the collections of the academy during its earlier history was Anders Sparrman, a student of Carl Linnaeus and participant in the voyages of Captain James Cook. Another important name in the history of the museum is the zoologist, paleontologist and archaeologist Sven Nilsson, who brought the previously disorganised zoological collections of the museum into order during his time as keeper (1828–1831) before returning to Lund as professor.

The present buildings for the museum in Frescati, Stockholm, was designed by the architect Axel Anderberg and completed in 1916, topped with a dome. As of 2014 it is the largest museum building in Sweden. The main campus of Stockholm University was later built next to the museum.

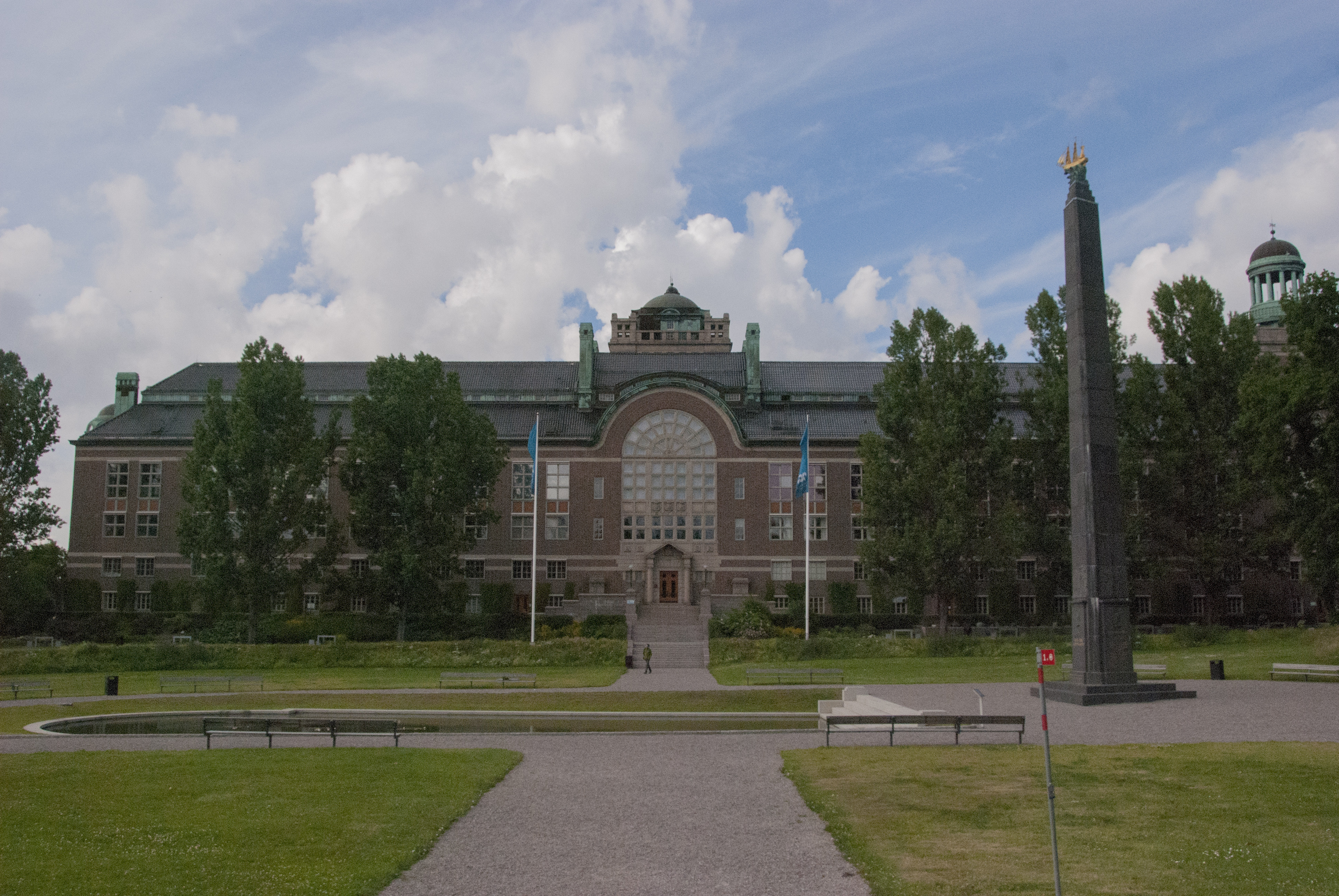
The Swedish Museum of Natural History Side Entrance

The museum has Sweden's first purpose-built IMAX Dome cinema called Cosmonova, which opened in a dedicated annex of the museum in 1993. The cinema is also the largest planetarium in Sweden.

The Index Herbariorum code assigned to this museum is S and it is used when citing housed specimens.

== See also ==
- List of museums in Stockholm
- National Museum of Natural History (disambiguation)
