= The Assignment (1977 film) =

1977 film

- Directed by: Mats Arehn
- Screenplay by: Mats Arehn; Ingemar Ejve; Lars-Magnus Jansson
- Story by: Per Wahlöö
- Produced by: Ingemar Ejve
- Starring: Thomas Hellberg; Christopher Plummer; Carolyn Seymour
- Cinematography: Lennart Carlsson
- Production companies: Nordisk Tonefilm; Svensk Filmindustri
- Distributed by: Svensk Filmindustri
- Release date: 11 July 1977
- Running time: 96 minutes
- Country: Sweden
- Language: Swedish

The Assignment (Swedish: Uppdraget ) is a 1977 Swedish drama film directed by Mats Arehn and starring Christopher Plummer, Thomas Hellberg and Carolyn Seymour. A Swedish foreign office official travels to South America on a peace-making mission. It was based on the novel Uppdraget by Per Wahlöö.

== Cast ==
- Christopher Plummer as Captain Behounek
- Thomas Hellberg as Erik Dalgren
- Carolyn Seymour as Danica Rodriguez
- Fernando Rey as Roberto Bidara
- Per Oscarsson as Sixto
- Sten Johan Hedman as Lopez
- Walter Gotell as Frankenheimer
- Lauritz Falk as De Mare
- Palle Granditsky as Hammar
- Rosette Graboi as Francisca
- Gabor Vernon as General Gami
- Johan Clason as Fernandez
- Miguel Franco as Larrinaga's Murderer
- Stefan Gryff as Ortega
- David Swift as Zaforteza
