= Lars-Erik Liedholm =

Swedish actor and screenwriter

- Born: April 5, 1928; Motala, Sweden
- Died: December 19, 1996 (aged 68); Stockholm, Swedén
- Education: Lund University
- Occupations: Actor, director, screenwriter
- Years active: 1954—1971
- Spouse: Brigit Carlsten

Lars-Erik Liedholm (5 April 1928 – 19 December 1996) was a Swedish actor, director and screenwriter.

== Biography ==
Liedholm was born in Motala, Sweden. He graduated from Lund University in 1948 and studied 1951–1954 at Gothenburg Theatre Academy. In 1954–1955, he was theatre director at Wasa Theatre in Finland. He was theatre director at the Östgöta Theatre in 1956–1959, where he also was theatre director in 1982–1985, Helsingborg City Theatre in 1960–1964 and the Royal Dramatic Theatre in 1964–1969.

From 1977–1982, Liedholm was married to actress and singer Birgit Carlstén. He died during 1996 in Stockholm

== Filmography ==
=== Actor ===
- All These Women (1964)
- Den vita stenen (TV series, 1973)
- August Strindberg: Ett liv (TV series, 1985)

=== Director ===
- Juninatt (1965)
- Familjen Ekbladh (TV series, 1971)

=== Screenwriter ===
- Hide and Seek (1963)
- Familjen Ekbladh (TV series, 1971)
