= The Dress (1964 film) =

1964 film

- Directed by: Vilgot Sjöman
- Written by: Ulla Isaksson
- Starring: Gunn Wållgren; Gunnar Björnstrand; Tina Hedström
- Cinematography: Sven Nykvist
- Edited by: Ulla Ryghe
- Music by: Erik Nordgren
- Production company: Svensk Filmindustri
- Distributed by: Svensk Filmindustri
- Release date: 5 October 1964
- Running time: 85 minutes
- Country: Sweden
- Language: Swedish

The Dress (Swedish: Klänningen) is a 1964 Swedish drama film directed by Vilgot Sjöman and starring Gunn Wållgren, Gunnar Björnstrand and Tina Hedström. It was shot at the Råsunda Studios in Stockholm. The film's sets were designed by the art director Bibi Lindström.

== Cast ==
- Gunn Wållgren as Helen Fürst
- Gunnar Björnstrand as Helmer Berg
- Tina Hedström as Edit Fürst
- Mimi Pollak as Mrs. Rubin
- Lars-Erik Berenett as Delivery Man
- Conny Borg as Young Man
- Fillie Lyckow as Saleswoman
- Ellika Mann as Saleswoman
- Berit Tancred as Saleswoman

== Bibliography ==
- Larsson, Mariah. A Cinema of Obsession: The Life and Work of Mai Zetterling. University of Wisconsin Press, 2020.
