= Joyce Carol Oates: A Body in the Service of Mind =

2023 film by Stig Björkman

Joyce Carol Oates: A Body in the Service of Mind is a 2023 documentary film about the life of Joyce Carol Oates directed by Stig Björkman.
