= Tina Hedström =

Swedish actress (1942–1984)

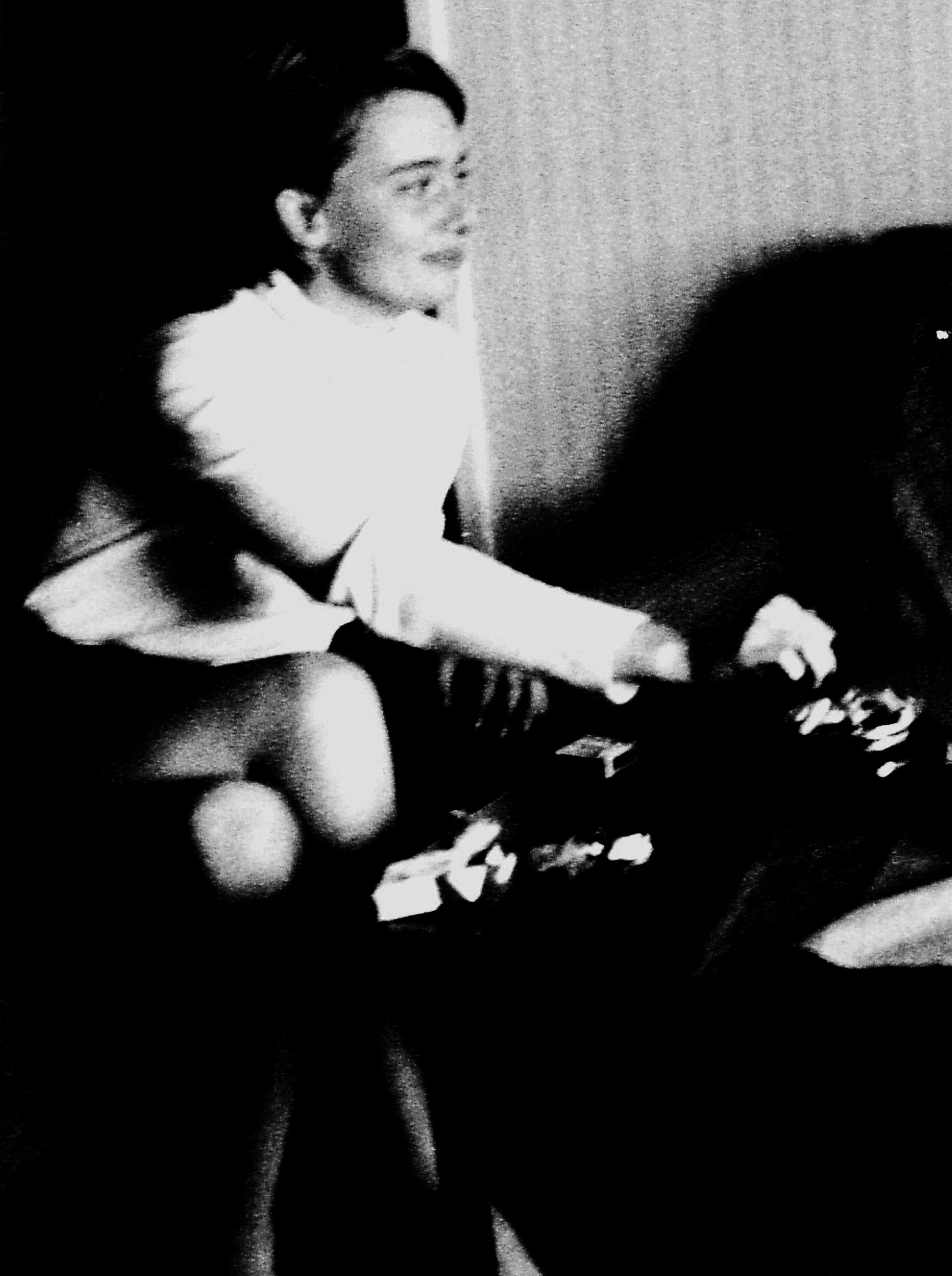
- Born: Eva Christina Hedström; 31 May 1942; Solna, Sweden
- Died: 20 October 1984 (aged 42); Stockholm, Sweden
- Occupation: Actress
- Years active: 1963–1984
- Known for: Tamara Kusenov in Topaz

Eva Christina Hedström (31 May 1942, in Solna – 20 October 1984, in Stockholm) was a Swedish actress, best known internationally for appearing as Tamara Kusenov in the Alfred Hitchcock film Topaz (1969). She also appeared in several Swedish films.

== Filmography ==
Year	Title	Role	Notes
1964	The Dress	Edit Fürst	
1965	Juninatt	Marianne	
1965	Tills. med Gunilla månd. kväll o. tisd.	Inga	
1966	My Sister, My Love	Ebba Livin	
1968	Vindingevals	Rosa	
1968	Fanny Hill	Monika Arvidsson	
1968	The Corridor	Olsson's daughter	
1969	Topaz	Tamara Kusenov	
1971	Maid in Sweden	Helen	
1972	Georgia, Georgia	Waitress	
1975	The White Wall	Mona's mother	
