= Georgia, Georgia =

1972 film

- Film poster
- Directed by: Stig Björkman
- Screenplay by: Maya Angelou
- Produced by: Jack Jordan
- Starring: Diana Sands; Dirk Benedict
- Cinematography: Andreas Bellis
- Edited by: Sten-Göran Camitz
- Music by: Maya Angelou
- Production companies: Diotima Films; Jorkel Productions
- Distributed by: Cinerama Releasing Corporation
- Release date: 10 March 1972
- Running time: 91 minutes
- Countries: Sweden; United States
- Language: English

Georgia, Georgia is a 1972 Swedish-American drama film directed by Stig Björkman. It was entered into the 23rd Berlin International Film Festival. Its screenplay, written by Maya Angelou, is the first known film production for a screenplay written by a Black woman; Angelou also composed the film's score, despite having very little additional input in the making of the film.

== Plot ==
Georgia Martin, the most popular American singer in Europe, embarks on a three-day journey to Stockholm in order to debut her newest song. Shortly after her arrival, she sits down for an interview during which she is asked questions about romance and issues involving race and American politics, much to her chagrin. Afterwards, she is introduced to Michael Winters, a Vietnam war resister who has agreed to take photographs of her for a Swedish magazine.

Afterwards, Georgia's manager, Herbert Thompson, chauffeurs her and her traveling companion and mother figure, Alberta Anderson, to their hotel. After Georgia retires to her suite, Bobo, a black man who, like Michael, deserted the United States Army after fighting in Vietnam, approaches the receptionist, unsuccessfully requesting an audience with Georgia. The receptionist later has a sexual encounter with Herbert in the latter's suite.

The next day, Herbert accompanies Georgia to her photo shoot with Michael after Mrs. Anderson warns her not to let the white American photographer take advantage of her. Bobo repeatedly plagues Michael with requests to speak to Georgia, but he is turned away from the photo shoot and ends up introducing himself to Mrs. Anderson. Bobo tells her of his plan to encourage Georgia to advocate for black deserters in Sweden, but Mrs. Anderson says that Georgia will not consider it and implies that she is out of touch with her African-American heritage.

After she and Georgia return to the hotel, Mrs. Anderson delivers Bobo's intentions to Georgia and suggests him as a possible match for her. She resents being asked to shoulder the burden of uplifting so many other blacks in Sweden and finds a relationship with deserter detrimental to her already troubled life. Mrs. Anderson later calls Georgia's stance an irresponsible abandonment of her duties as a black woman, prompting Herbert to ask why Georgia keeps her in her company. Georgia reveals that Mrs. Anderson reminds her of the southern upbringing that she has escaped.

During another round of shooting, Georgia grows fond of Michael, even calling him a credit to the white race. At the same time, Bobo is taking a stroll with Mrs. Anderson, who tells him of how her husband was beaten to the point of sterility by a white mob.

Georgia sings her new song, "I Can Call Down Rain;" Michael is in attendance and appears mesmerized by the performance. Herbert is concerned about the budding interracial relationship, but not hostile. Mrs. Anderson brings Bobo to Georgia's dressing room, where she and Herbert are talking; a furious Georgia pushes Mrs. Anderson out of the room.

Michael snaps his last photos of Georgia and invites her to his apartment, and they decide to have sex. Word of their romance reaches Mrs. Anderson, who is incensed by what she perceives as a slight upon the black race. When Georgia tells Mrs. Anderson how good Michael makes her feel, she convinces the singer to let her brush her hair. After strangling Georgia, Mrs. Anderson brushes her dead victim's hair while singing "This Little Light of Mine".

== Cast ==
- Dirk Benedict as Michael Winters
- Diana Sands as Georgia Martin
- Stig Engström as Lars
- James Thomas Finley Jr. as Jack
- Roger Furman as Herbert Thompson
- Minnie Gentry as Mrs. Alberta Anderson
- Tina Hedström as The Waitress
- Randolph Henry as Gus
- Diana Kjær as Birgit
- Lars-Erik Berenett as Reception Clerk
- Vibeke Løkkeberg as Guest
- Artie Sheppard as Scottie
- Terry Whitmore as "Bobo"

== Reception ==
A. H. Weiler of The New York Times gave the film a mixed review, saying that Angelou and the cast "cannot be faulted for lack of purpose and sincerity…[b]ut their emotions are, sadly enough, too often projected in rhetoric and surface histrionics rather than drama." He praised Sands' "finely tuned performance" as Georgia and Björkman's direction, but criticizes Angelou's writing as "too often simplistic and only occasionally memorable."
