= Hans V. Engström =

Swedish actor (1949–2014)

- Born: Hans Vollart Engström; 24 February 1949; Enskede, Sweden
- Died: 5 August 2014 (aged 65)
- Occupation: Actor
- Years active: 1969–2007

Hans Vollart Engström (24 February 1949 – 5 August 2014) was a Swedish actor. He was best known for his roles as Uno in the television soap opera Rederiet from 1992 until 2002. He also portrayed Jan in the drama film Mamma (1982). He primarily appeared in television films during his career.

Engström was born in Enskede near Stockholm. He died from liver failure on 5 August 2014 at the age of 65. His last role was in Beck – Den japanska shungamålningen (2007).

== Other websites ==
- Hans V. Engström at IMDb
- Hans V. Engström at the Swedish Film Database
