= Richard Carlsohn =

Swedish actor and singer

Richard Carlsohn (bord 29 January 1965 in Tranås, Sweden) is a Swedish actor and singer. His breakthrough was performing in the musical Cabaret at Oscarsteatern in 1989. Since then he has played many roles in musicals, including Les Misérables and The Phantom of the Opera. He has won the Swedish theatre award, Guldmasken several times, and has been a recording artist in his own right. In 1993, Carlsohn entered Melodifestivalen with the song "Ge mig din hand", written by Martin Klaman and Hasse Skoog, where it shared 6th (last) place.

He now lives in Norrköping, Sweden, performing at the Östgöta Theatre. His roles include Sir Percy Blakeney in The Scarlet Pimpernel, which was critically acclaimed, and Mercutio in Romeo and Juliet. From December 2008 to May 2009, he played the Emcee in Cabaret.
