= To Be a Millionaire =

1980 film

- Mannen som blev miljonär
- Directed by: Mats Arehn
- Written by: Olle Hellbom
- Produced by: Olle Hellbom
- Starring: Eddie Axberg
- Cinematography: Rune Ericson
- Release date: 17 May 1980
- Running time: 100 minutes
- Country: Sweden
- Language: Swedish

To Be a Millionaire (Swedish: Mannen som blev miljonär) is a 1980 Swedish comedy film directed by Mats Arehn. The film won the Guldbagge Award for Best Film at the 16th Guldbagge Awards.

== Cast ==
- Eddie Axberg as Jens Fors
- Olof Bergström as Bengt Sundelin
- Brasse Brännström as Jan Olsson
- Allan Edwall as Persson
- Gösta Ekman as Stig
- Björn Gustafson as Bosse
- Anki Lidén as Anki
- Lis Nilheim as Anne-Marie
