= Ulf Hasseltorp =

Swedish actor (born 1960)

Ulf Karl Åke Hasseltorp (born 28 September 1960 in Stockholm) is a Swedish actor. He played the role of Hampus in the 1973 TV series Den vita stenen.

== Selected filmography ==
- Maria (1975)
