= Maria (1975 film) =

1975 film

- Directed by: Mats Arehn
- Written by: Kerstin Thorvall
- Produced by: Ingemar Ejve
- Starring: Lis Nilheim
- Cinematography: Lasse Björne
- Release date: 6 June 1975
- Running time: 100 minutes
- Country: Sweden
- Language: Swedish

Maria is a 1975 Swedish drama film directed by Mats Arehn. Lis Nilheim won the award for Best Actress at the 11th Guldbagge Awards.

== Cast ==
- Eddie Axberg as Arrested Youth
- Olof Bergström as Probation Officer
- Janne Carlsson as Rikard
- Viveca Dahlén as Sylvia
- Siv Ericks as Woman at the Hairdresser
- Karl Erik Flens as Maria's Father
- Palle Granditsky as Plainclothes Policeman
- Inga Grönlund as Wife of Probation Officer
- Ulf Hasseltorp as Magnus Widen
- Sten Johan Hedman as Convict in the Fight (as Sten Hedman)
- Thomas Hellberg as Leif Johansson
- Steve Jansson as Teacher
- Ove Kant as Jailer
- Jan Kreigsman as Policeman
- Olle Leth as Plainclothes Policeman
- Lars Lundgren as Jailer (as Lasse Lundgren)
- Peter Malmsjö as Kenta
- Lis Nilheim as Maria Widen
