= Stig Engström (actor) =

Swedish actor

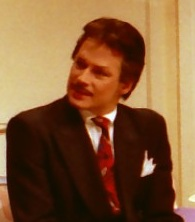
- Engström in 1988
- Born: 14 January 1942 (age 84); Stockholm, Sweden
- Occupation: Actor
- Years active: 1968-present

Stig Engström (born 14 January 1942) is a Swedish actor. He has appeared in more than 60 films and television shows since 1968.

== Selected filmography ==
- Badarna (1968)
- Georgia, Georgia (1972)
- I Am Maria (1979)
- Göta kanal eller Vem drog ur proppen? (1981)
- Mio in the Land of Faraway (1987)
- The Police Murderer (1994)
- Drowning Ghost (2004)
- Behind Blue Skies (2010)
