= Louise Boije af Gennäs =

Swedish writer (born 1961)

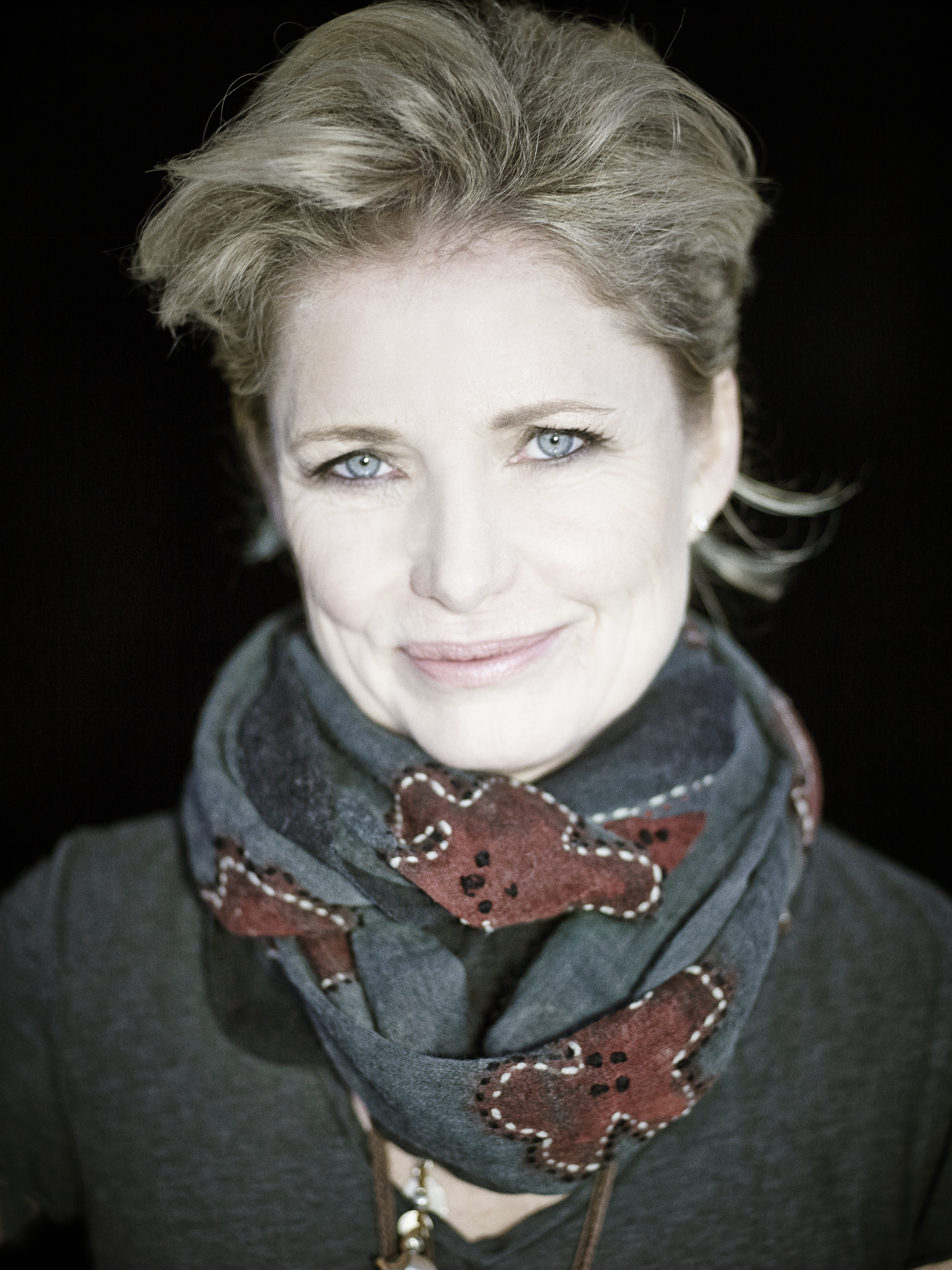
Louise Boije af Gennäs, 2014

Louise Gunvor Catharina Lagercrantz Boije af Gennäs (née Boije af Gennäs; born 1 November 1961) is a Swedish writer, feminist, and co-creator of Rederiet, the longest-running Swedish soap opera in history.

Boije af Gennäs best-selling novel, the semi-autobiographical Stjärnor utan svindel (Stars Without Vertigo) from 1996, is based on the author's relationship with the prominent feminist Mian Lodalen. The story unleashes the tale of 32-year-old Sophie, who enjoys conjugal contentment with a businessman while building a career as a novelist and journalist. The couple's bourgeois life amid Stockholm's jet set lurches toward the wild side, however, when the lesbian radical feminist Kaja enters the scene, the friendship between the two women erupts into a passionate love affair.

== Biography ==
Born into the Swedish branch of the noble (frälse) Boije af Gennäs family, she was raised in Bromma, Stockholm until the age of 14, when her parents moved to France. She then attended the Lundsbergs boarding school in Storfors until the age of 18, when she moved to the United States to study literary history at Wellesley College. After four years, she moved back to Sweden and briefly studied at Lund University before moving back to the U.S. to pursue a master's degree in journalism at University of California, Berkeley, graduating in 1987.

After returning to Sweden, she worked as a freelance journalist before joining Sveriges Television (SVT) as a screenwriter in 1991. There, she developed the concept of what was to later become Rederiet, while writing her first novel Ta vad man vill ha. She was also responsible for developing the concept of the Nya tider soap opera, broadcast on TV4 from 1999 to 2006.

In the early-1990s, Boije af Gennäs met Peter Voors, who was then employed as the party secretary of the New Democracy (Sweden) party. They resided in the U.S. for several years before divorcing and her moving back to Sweden. She was then involved in a relationship with author Mian Lodalen before marrying businessman Carl-Erik Lagercrantz, presently the CEO of Vargas Holding and a co-founder of Northvolt, in 1999. They have two children.

== Bibliography ==
- Ta vad man vill ha (1991)
- Ju mer jag ser dig (1992)
- Ingen människa en ö (1994)
- Stjärnor utan svindel (1996)
- Rent hus (1999)
- När kärleken kom (1999)

== Filmography ==
- Rederiet (1992)
- Snoken (1993)
- Skilda världar (1996)
