= Stig Björkman =

Swedish film director

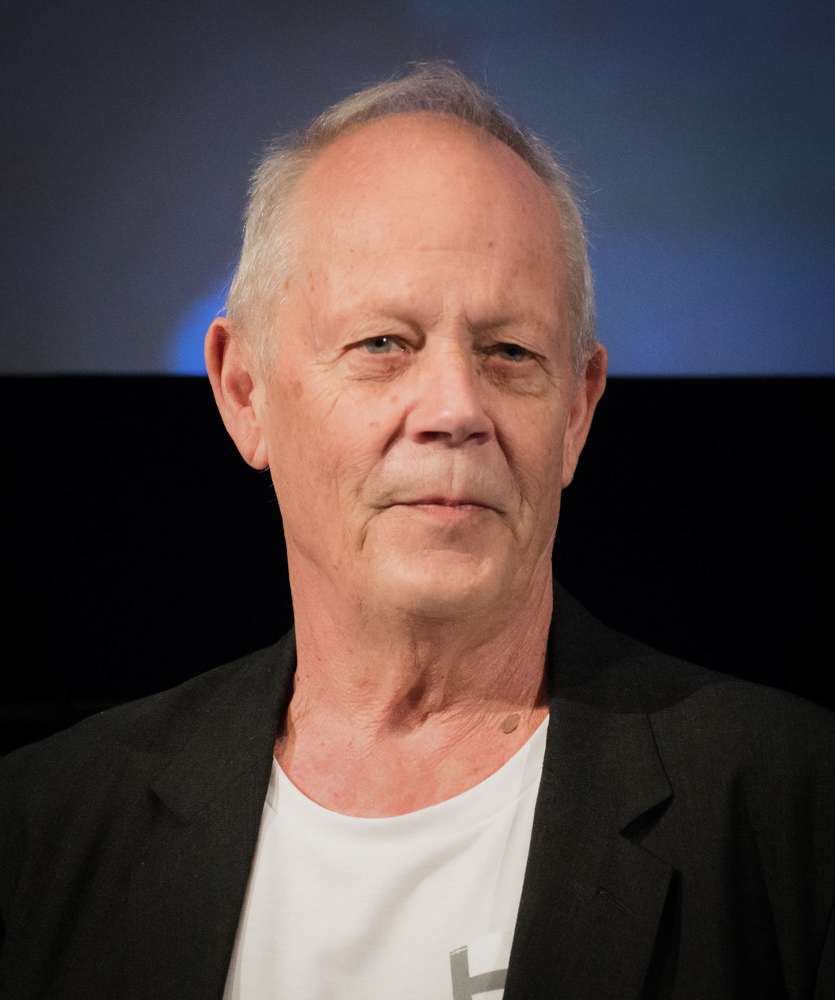
- Born: 2 October 1938 (age 87)
- Occupations: Writer; Film critic Film director
- Years active: 1964–present

Stig Björkman (born 2 October 1938) is a Swedish writer and film critic. He has also directed fifteen films since 1964. His 1972 film Georgia, Georgia was entered into the 23rd Berlin International Film Festival. His 1975 film The White Wall was entered into the 9th Moscow International Film Festival. His 2015 documentary Ingrid Bergman: In Her Own Words was screened in the Cannes Classics section at the 2015 Cannes Film Festival.

== Selected bibliography ==
- Bergman on Bergman: Interviews with Ingmar Bergman (1970), ISBN 9780306805202
- Woody Allen; Stig Björkman (2005). Woody Allen on Woody Allen: In Conversation with Stig Björkman. Grove Press. ISBN 978-0-8021-4203-0.
- Trier on von Trier (1999); Faber & Faber, 2003, ISBN 9780571207077
- Fucking film: den nya svenska filmen (2002)
- Joyce Carol Oates: Samtal med Stig Björkman (2003)

== Selected filmography ==
- Georgia, Georgia (1972)
- The White Wall (1975)
- Ingrid Bergman: In Her Own Words (2015)
- Joyce Carol Oates: A Body in the Service of Mind (2023)
