= Lis Nilheim =

Swedish actress (1944–2025)

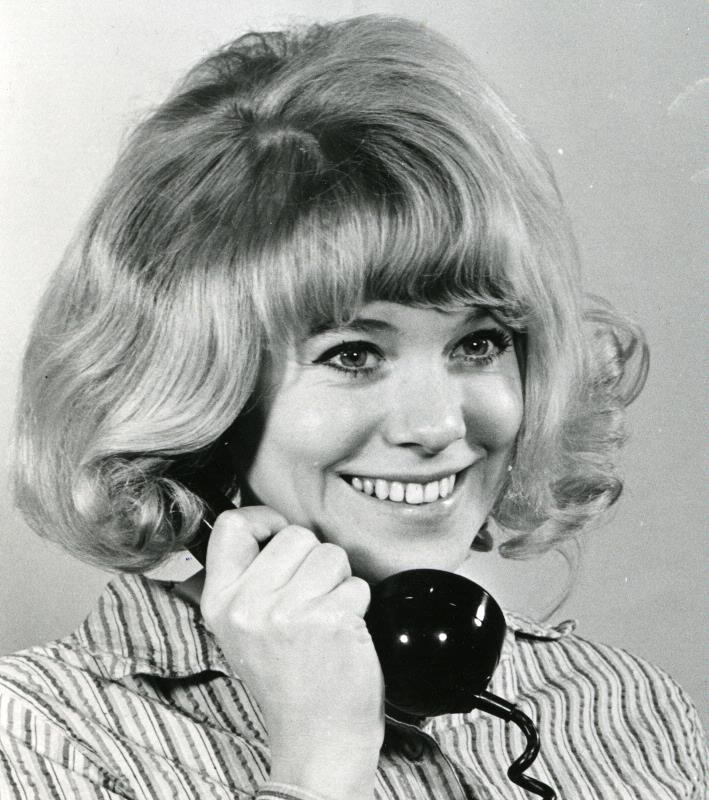
- Nilheim in Hallå där! at Helsingborg City Theatre in 1968
- Born: Karen Lis Nilheim; 5 June 1944; Stockholm, Sweden
- Died: February 2025 (aged 80); Stockholm, Sweden
- Occupation: Actress
- Years active: 1964–2003
- Partner: Lars Göran Carlson (m. 1966)

Karen Lis Nilheim (5 June 1944 – February 2025) was a Swedish actress. She won the award for Best Actress at the 11th Guldbagge Awards for her role in Maria. She appeared in more than 45 films and television shows from 1964. On 26 February 2025, her death was announced by her daughter. She was 80.

She appeared in over 60 Stockholm City Theatre productions during the course of her career.

== Selected filmography ==
- Äktenskapsbrottaren (1964)
- Maria (1975)
- Father to Be (1979)
- Du är inte klok, Madicken (1979)
- Madicken på Junibacken (1980)
- To Be a Millionaire (1980)
- Raskenstam (1983)
