= Thomas Hellberg =

Swedish actor (1941–2023)

Björn Thomas Hellberg
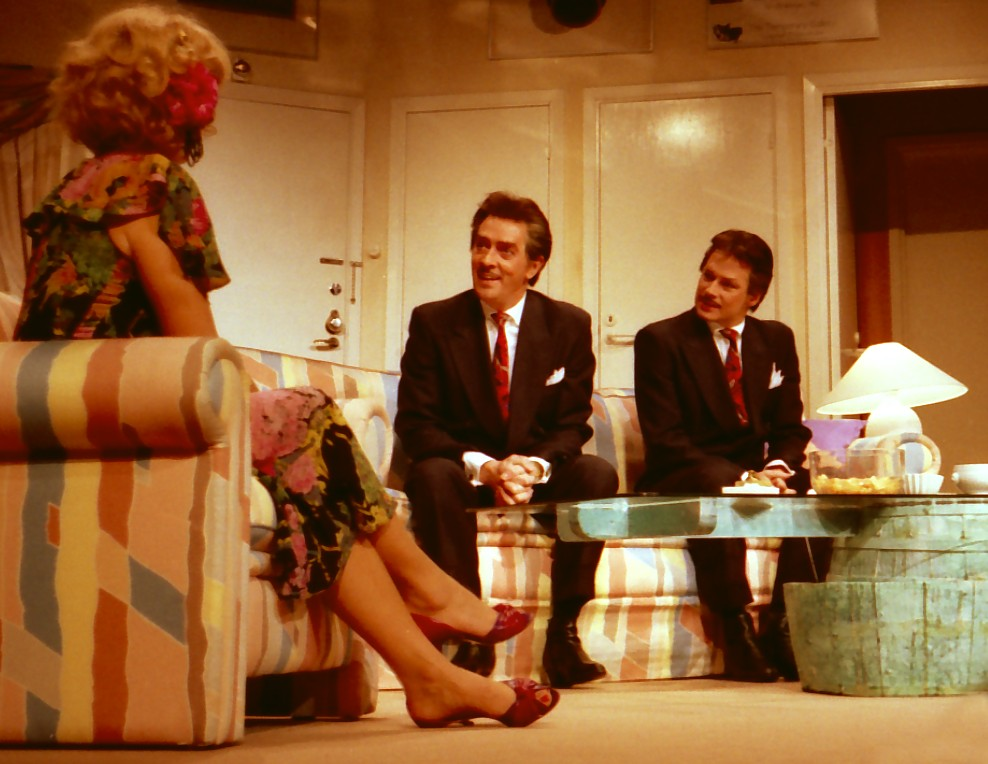
- Hellberg (left) and Stig Engström in the play The Odd Couple at Maximteatern in 1988
- Born: 29 September 1941; Stockholm, Sweden
- Died: 22 January 2023 (aged 81)
- Education: Malmö Theatre Academy
- Occupations: Actor; director; screenwriter
- Years active: 1975–2009

Björn Thomas Hellberg (29 September 1941 – 22 January 2023) was a Swedish actor, director and screenwriter. He graduated from the Malmö Theatre Academy in 1968. His film debut was Maria (1975).

Hellberg died on 22 January 2023, at the age of 81.

== Biography ==
Thomas Hellberg studied at the State School of Acting in Malmö, in the same class as Agneta Ekmanner and Claire Wikholm, and graduated in 1968.

Between 1971 and 1983, Hellberg was active at Stockholm City Theatre. He made his film debut in 1975 and appeared in several of Bo Widerberg’s films. In 1976, he played Gunvald Larsson in The Man on the Roof. Later, he also worked as a director.

During the 1990s and 2000s, Hellberg appeared in the TV film The Orange Man and the TV series Kopplingen (as writer, director, and lead actor), Rederiet (where he both played Captain Georg Lager and directed), and Ivar Kreuger. He was also a frequently employed voice actor, including voicing Alien in SVT’s science fiction children’s series Vintergatan and the Swedish voice of Tigger in several Winnie-the-Pooh animated films.

Thomas Hellberg is buried in the memorial grove at the Skogskyrkogården cemetery in Stockholm.

== Selected filmography ==
- Maria (1975)
- The Man on the Roof (1976)
- Polare (1976)
- The Assignment (1977)
- Raskenstam (1983)
- Mannen från Mallorca (1984)
- Zingo (1998)
- Vintergatan 5a (as Alien's voice) (2000)
- Break Even (2005)
