= National Museum of Natural History (disambiguation) =

The National Museum of Natural History is in Washington, D.C., United States.

National Museum of Natural History may also refer to:

- National Museum of Natural History, Sofia, Bulgaria
- Chilean National Museum of Natural History, Santiago, Chile
- National Museum of Natural History, Havana, Cuba
- National Museum of Natural History, Paris, France
- National Museum of Natural History, New Delhi, India
- National Museum of Natural History, Luxembourg City, Luxembourg
- National Museum of Natural History, Mdina, Malta
- National Museum of Natural History, Leiden, Netherlands (1820-1984)
- Naturalis Biodiversity Center, Leiden, Netherlands
- National Museum of Natural History, Manila, Philippines
- National Museum of Natural History and Science, Lisbon, Portugal
- Grigore Antipa National Museum of Natural History, Bucharest, Romania
- Ditsong National Museum of Natural History, Pretoria, South Africa
- National Museum of Natural History, Colombo, Sri Lanka
- National Museum of Natural History at the National Academy of Sciences of Ukraine
- National Museum of Natural History, Uruguay

== See also ==
- Natural History Museum, London
- American Museum of Natural History
- Swedish Museum of Natural History
