= The White Wall =

1975 film

- Directed by: Stig Björkman
- Written by: Stig Björkman
- Produced by: Bengt Forslund
- Starring: Harriet Andersson
- Cinematography: Petter Davidson
- Release date: 24 March 1975
- Running time: 80 minutes
- Country: Sweden
- Language: Swedish

The White Wall (Swedish: Den vita väggen) is a 1975 Swedish drama film written and directed by Stig Björkman. It was entered into the 9th Moscow International Film Festival where Harriet Andersson won the award for Best Actress.

== Cast ==
- Harriet Andersson as Monika Larsson
- Lena Nyman as Berit
- Sven Wollter as Kjell Larsson
- Tomas Pontén as Arne Blomgren
- Rolf Larsson as Göran Engström
- Palle Granditsky as Bengtsson
- Theodor Kallifatides as Giorgos
- Martin Jonsson as Patrik Larsson
- Leif Ahrle
- Olle Björling as Salesman
- Gösta Bredefeldt as Mona's Father
- Tina Hedström as Mona's Mother
- Josefin Hodén as Mona
