= Mats Arehn =

Swedish film director and screenwriter

- Born: 19 June 1946 (age 79); Stockholm; Sweden
- Occupations: Film director, Screenwriter
- Years active: 1973 -

Mats Arehn is a Swedish film director and screenwriter. At the 16th Guldbagge Awards he won the award for Best Film for To Be a Millionaire.

== Selected filmography ==
- Maria (1975)
- The Assignment (1977)
- Father to Be (1979)
- To Be a Millionaire (1980)
- Istanbul (1989)
- The Chef (2005)
- Oskar, Oskar (2009)
