= Monica Nordquist =

Swedish actress

Eva Gun Monica Nordquist Graffman (born Nordquist 3 February 1941 - 24 June 2017) was a Swedish actress, well known for her roles as Madicken's mother and Fia's mother in the 1973 TV series Den vita stenen. All those films are directed by her partner Göran Graffman.

Born in Stockholm, Nordquist finished in second place in VeckoRevyn's Miss Sweden-competition in 1958 and qualified for the Miss Europe-competition.

From 1963 to 1966 she studied at Gothenburg Theatre Academy.

Nordquist died at the age of 76 on 24 June 2017.
