= Axel Anderberg =

Swedish architect

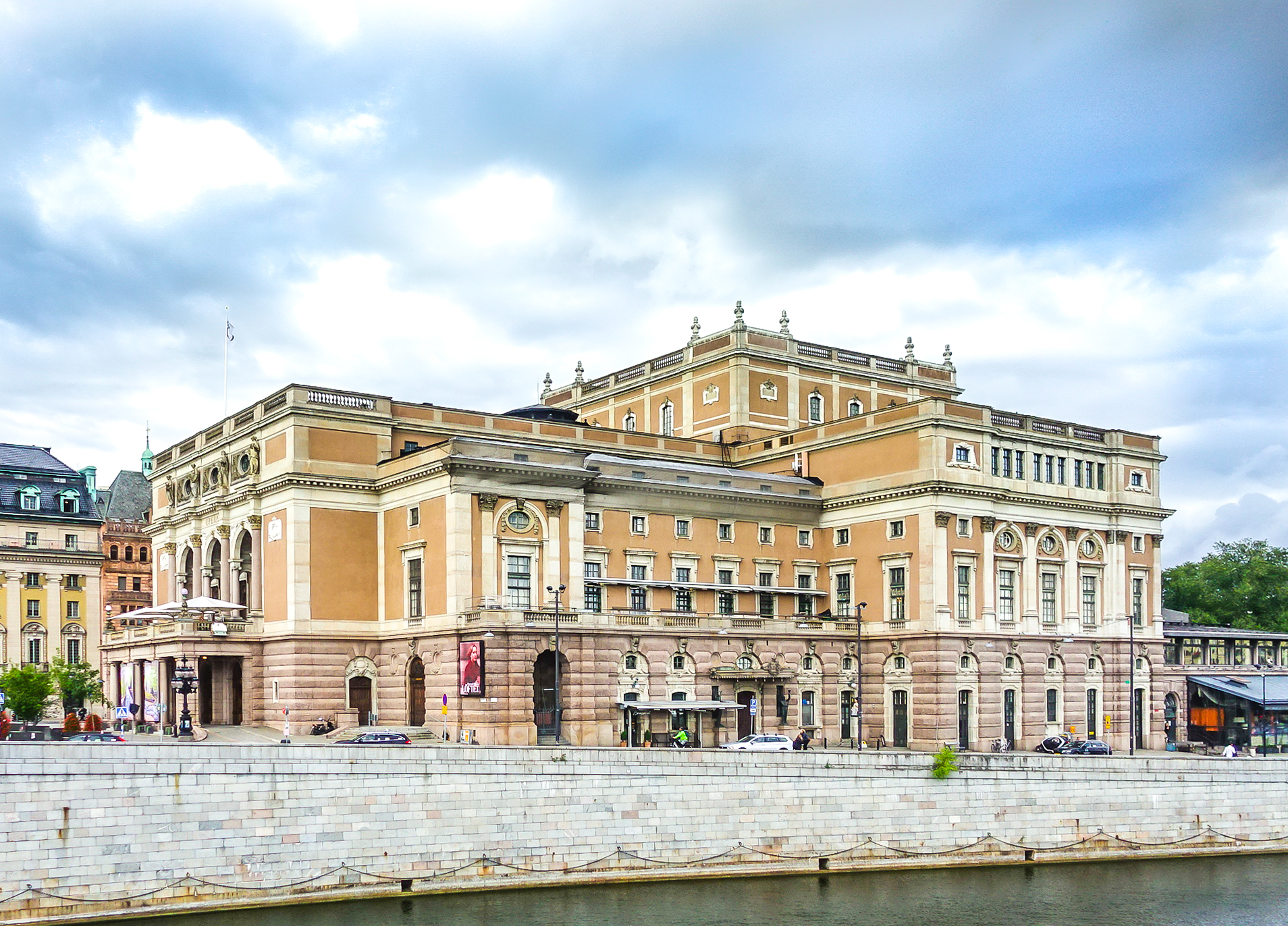
The Royal Swedish Opera, Stockholm

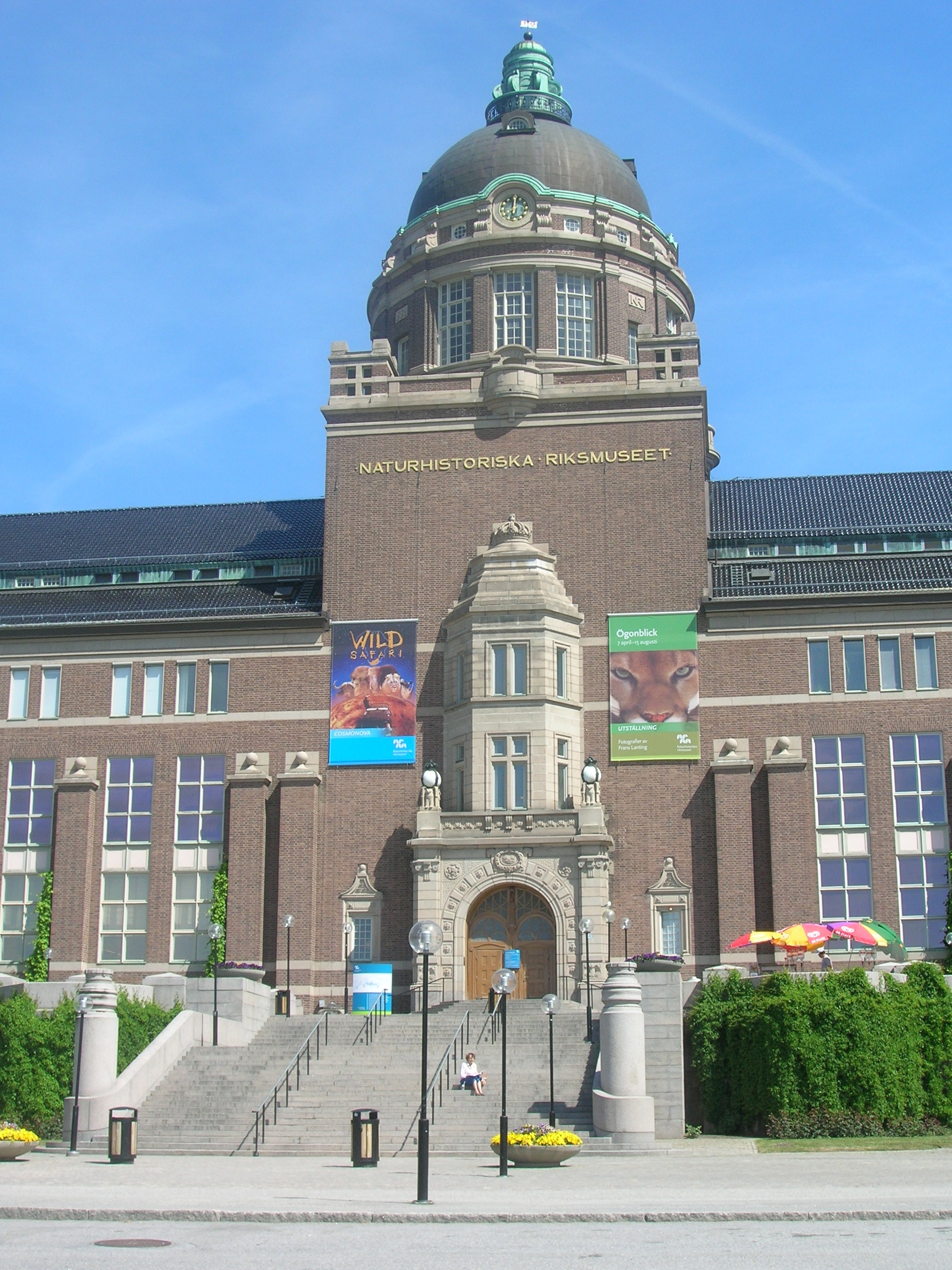
Main entrance of the Swedish Museum of Natural History.

Axel Johan Anderberg (November 27, 1860 – March 27, 1937) was a Swedish architect. He was active from the 1880s to the early 1930s.

== Biography ==
Anderberg was born in Kristianstad in Skåne County, Sweden. Anderberg received his education in the architectural school of the Royal Institute of Technology (1880–84), and the architecture section of the Royal Swedish Academy of Arts (1884–87), after which he spent a year traveling to Germany, France and Italy.

His first significant commission was the new Opera House in Stockholm (1889–1898), which replaced the Gustavian Opera House which had dated to 1782. After having won the contest for the building he spent additional time abroad for the particular purpose of studying theatre architecture. He later designed the city theatres in Karlstad (1893), Linköping (1902–1903) and Kristianstad (1906) and the Oscarsteatern in Stockholm (1906).

During his early career he built several theatres, working mostly in a mix of neo-baroque and Art Nouveau, while his later work largely consisted of buildings for scientific and academic institutions in the purer neo-classicist style of the period. Anderberg built the large new complex for the Swedish Museum of Natural History (completed 1916) at Frescati outside Stockholm, and later several other scientific institutions in the same area, including the building for the Royal Swedish Academy of Sciences. He also built additional wings to the Royal Library building in Humlegården in Stockholm. For Uppsala University, Anderberg built the Paleontological Museum (1929) and an extension to the Carolina Rediviva. In 1931, the new building for the Stockholm Observatory was completed in Saltsjöbaden outside the city.

He died during 1937 at Rotebro in Stockholm County, Sweden.
