= Jonna Liljendahl =

Swedish actress (born 1970)

Jonna Lisa Liljendahl (born 6 November 1970 in Stockholm) is a Swedish former child actress, well known for her role as Madicken (by Astrid Lindgren).
