= Göran Graffman =

Swedish actor and director (1931–2014)

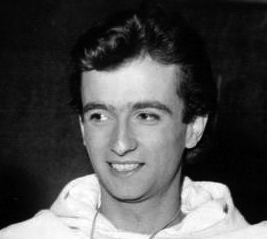
- Göran Graffman in July 1953
- Resting place: Skogskyrkogården
- Occupation: Actor

Eric Göran Graffman (12 February 1931 – November 2014) was a Swedish actor and film director from Gothenburg). He was the father of the actor Per Graffman, the director Emil Graffman and Mats Graffman.

Graffman worked as actor at Gothenburg City Theatre since the 1950s, and, in 1967, he started working at the Royal Dramatic Theatre. He began directing films in the 1970s.

== Biography ==
Göran Graffman was the son of the Court of Appeal lawyer Gösta Graffman and Gunhild Josephson. After graduating in Sigtuna in 1950, he attended the Gothenburg City Theatre's student school 1951–1954. Graffman has been active as an actor at the Gothenburg City Theater since the early 1950s and has since worked at the Stockholm City Theatre, the TV Theater and the Radio Theater, among others. In 1967 he came to the Royal Dramatic Theatre, where he then largely stayed. He worked there in several acclaimed productions directed by Per Verner-Carlsson, such as the special experiment Pelikanenx2 on radio and stage in 1968, as Gustav III in Kastrater (1977) and in Seneca's death (1982), both by Sven Delblanc. He has worked with directors such as Ingmar Bergman, Alf Sjöberg and Canadian Robert Lepage and in works by Erland Josephson, as the lead role in the world premiere of A Talking Silence (1984).

Since the 1970s he has also worked as a director, for example of Lars Norén's Night is the Mother of the Day (1983), the Swedish premiere of Bernard-Marie Koltès The Negro and the Dog's Fight (1986), P.O. Enquist's I lodjurets timma (1988), Hjalmar Bergman's Swedenhielms (1990) and Döden och flickan (1992). In 1981, he directed August Strindberg's The Father (as well as a joint project with famous Swedish actors) at the Circle in the Square theater on Broadway in New York. For television, he has directed a number of productions, including Sławomir Mrożek's Tango (1972), the popular family series Den vita stenen (1973), Strindberg's Storm (1988) and the film Long Weekend (1992). On film, he has directed three films about Astrid Lindgren's Madicken (1979-80), including with his wife Monica Nordquist in the recurring role as the mother.

== Selected filmography ==
- 2004 - The Return of the Dancing Master (TV)
- 1985 - August Strindberg: ett liv (TV)
- 1981 - Rasmus på luffen
- 1964 - All These Women

=== Director ===
- 1979–80 - Madicken
- 1973 - Den vita stenen (TV)
