= Madicken =

Margareta Engström
- Madicken (Jonna Liljendahl) - from the film Du är inte klok, Madicken
- First appearance: Madicken (1960)
- Last appearance: Jullov är ett bra påhitt, sa Madicken (1993)
- Created by: Astrid Lindgren
- Portrayed by: Jonna Liljendahl

In-universe information
- Nickname: Madicken
- Gender: Girl
- Occupation: Schoolgirl
- Religion: Christianity (protestantism)
- Nationality: Swedish

Madicken is a fictional character created by the Swedish author Astrid Lindgren. Madicken appeared in six books, and its adaptations: two films — Du är inte klok, Madicken (1979) (You're out of your mind, Maggie) and Madicken på Junibacken (1980) (Meg of June Hill); and a TV series (1979).

Du är inte klok Madicken and the follow-up film Madicken på Junibacken tell about a 7-year-old middle class girl, set during World War I. Both are edited from various episodes of the TV production Madicken, which screened in 1979 (season 1) and 1980 (season 2).

Her full name is Margareta Engström, but the only time anyone uses it is when admonishing her. Her mother is a housewife - they have a maid/nanny named Alva who does the work around the house, and her father is the editor-in-chief of the local newspaper.

== See also ==
- Emil i Lönneberga
- Ronja, the Robber's Daughter
- Pippi Longstocking
