= Cinema of Sweden =

- No. of screens: 874 (2024)
  - Per capita: 9.9 per 100,000 (2011)
- Main distributors: Walt Disney (19.7%); Nordisk Film (14.2%); Universal (UIP) (13.8%); Warner Bros. (13.0%)

Produced feature films (2024)
- Total: 53
- Fictional: 24
- Documentary: 29

Number of admissions (2024)
- Total: 10,300,000
  - Per capita: 1.0 (2024)
- National films: 2,296,000 (22.2%)

Gross box office (2024)
- Total: SEK 1.42 billion (~€124.1 million)
- National films: SEK 288 million (~€25.1 million) (20.2%)

Swedish cinema is known for including many acclaimed films; during the 20th century the industry was the most prominent of Scandinavia. This is largely due to the popularity and prominence of directors Victor Sjöström and especially Ingmar Bergman; and more recently Roy Andersson, Lasse Hallström, Lukas Moodysson and Ruben Östlund.

Famous Swedish film and TV stars include Anna Q. Nilsson, Victor Sjöström (also director, etc.), Lars Hanson, Warner Oland, Greta Garbo, Ingrid Bergman, Kristina Söderbaum, Zarah Leander, Anita Ekberg, Ann-Margret, Viveca Lindfors, Signe Hasso, Mai Zetterling, Max von Sydow, Erland Josephson, Ann Zacharias, Maud Adams, Britt Ekland, Ingrid Thulin, Ernst-Hugo Järegård, Agneta Eckemyr, Harriet Andersson, Bibi Andersson, Sven-Bertil Taube, Bo Brundin, Dolph Lundgren, Joel Kinnaman, Melinda Kinnaman, Pernilla August, Peter Stormare, Lena Olin, Stellan Skarsgård, Malin Åkerman, Alexander Skarsgård, Bill Skarsgård, Alicia Vikander, Izabella Scorupco, Noomi Rapace, Ola Rapace, Mikael Nyqvist, David Dencik, Helena Mattsson, Rebecca Ferguson, Fares Fares, and MyAnna Buring.

== Early Swedish cinema ==
Trolldrycken (1915)

Swedish filmmaking rose to international prominence when Svenska Biografteatern moved from Kristianstad to Lidingö in 1911. During the next decade the company's two star-directors, Victor Sjöström and Mauritz Stiller, produced many silent films, some being adaptations of stories by the Nobel-prizewinning novelist Selma Lagerlöf. Sjöström's most respected films often made use of the Swedish landscape. Stiller fostered the early popularity of Greta Garbo, particularly through the Gösta Berlings saga (1924). Many of the films made at the Biografteatern had a significant impact on German directors of the silent and early sound eras, largely because Germany remained cut off from French, British, and American influences through World War I (1914–1918).

The global expansion of the United States after World War I had its consequences in the dynamics of cinema, and changed previous favorable market conditions that benefited Sweden's film exports to Europe. During wartimes, Hollywood not only was able to conquer its domestic market but also managed to increase its exports to European countries – which produced fewer films during wartime – and even to Latin America. The neutrality of Sweden could have been translated in the fortification of its film industry, which to some extent was true since its production grew relatively during this period, but its market share declined severely. While in 1913, the last year before the War, the American share in Sweden was only about 4%; in 1919, the first year after the war, it was 80%.

Facing the exponential growth of US films and its dominance domestically and internationally, Swedish film production, according to Jan Olsson, "operated with a Nordic […] home base" and felt compelled to adapt its market strategies to the new context to regain relevance. The order of the day was to stop what was called the risk of becoming not only the country but the whole continent a "colony of Film America". The monopolistic organization of Svensk Filmindustri in 1919 and also its further model of co-productions with other European film companies are one of the first expressions of the paradox that characterized the attempt of consolidating simultaneously a national and a transnational cinema. The difficulty of delimiting how the production begins and ends is not the only restriction that makes these theoretical frameworks potentially problematic, but the multiple discourses that each film express reinforces the complexity that is a supposed property of cultural expressions.

To make Swedish films more appealing to the audiences, the challenge was the maintenance of their specificity – stories with a background based on literature about Nordic countryside was one of the "national" trademarks – with some aspects that made Hollywood successful, such as an agile narrative pace. The new market dynamics established new different aesthetic expressions for Swedish cinema and its narratives expressed the duality between cosmopolitanism and Swedish heritage. Flickan i frack (Girl in Tails, Karin Swanström, 1926), for example, represents the convergence of these different perspectives with its portrayal of an urban Stockholm contrasting with the countryside and the desire of the protagonist to become an independent woman but also to be recognized by the Swedish traditionalism.

The attempts of constructing a national cinema able to be also universal was a response to the Hollywood dominance, which, in the end, is the consequence of the consolidation of the United States economic supremacy; after all, European films were not able to develop the same capacity of escalation in production and exhibition. The capitalist tendency of constituting monopolies and concentrating wealth is extended also to cinema. By the end of the 1920s, all major US exhibitors had offices in Sweden.

In the mid-twenties, Sjöström, Stiller, and Garbo moved to the United States to work for MGM, bringing Swedish influence to Hollywood. The departure left a vacuum in Swedish cinema, which subsequently went into a financial crisis. Both directors later returned to Sweden, but Stiller died soon after his return while Sjöström returned to theatre work for most of the remainder of his career.

The advent of the talking movie at the beginning of the 1930s brought about a financial stabilization for Swedish cinema, but the industry sacrificed artistic and international ambitions for this financial success. Some provincial comedies emerged, created for the local market.

Notable films in early Swedish cinema include:

- A Man There Was (1917), directed by Victor Sjöström.
- Sir Arne's Treasure (1919), directed by Mauritz Stiller.
- The Phantom Carriage (1921), directed by Victor Sjöström
- The Saga of Gösta Berling (1924), directed by Mauritz Stiller.

== Swedish cinema through WWII ==
During World War II Swedish cinema gained artistically, mainly due to the directors Gustaf Molander, Alf Sjöberg, Hasse Ekman, Anders Henrikson and Hampe Faustman.

== Post-war ==
The influential Swedish filmmaker Ingmar Bergman rose to prominence in the fifties after he began making films in the mid-forties. His 1955 film Smiles of a Summer Night brought him international attention. A year later, he made one of his most famous films, The Seventh Seal. In the 1960s, Bergman won the Academy Award for Best Foreign Language Film for two consecutive years, with The Virgin Spring (Jungfrukällan) in 1960 and Through a Glass Darkly (Såsom i en spegel) in 1961. He won the award again in 1983, for the period family drama Fanny and Alexander (Fanny och Alexander). Bergman was nominated once for the Best Picture award, for the 1973 film Cries and Whispers (Viskningar och rop), the story of two sisters watching over their third sister's deathbed, both afraid she might die, but hoping she does. It lost to The Sting. Although it was not nominated in the Foreign Language category, gave Bergman the first of three nominations for Best Director. Bergman also won four Golden Globe Awards for Best Foreign Language Film.

Working closely with Bergman, cinematographer Sven Nykvist had a major impact on the visual aspects of Swedish cinema. Twice the recipient of the Academy Award for Best Cinematography, for Cries and Whispers and Fanny and Alexander, Nykvist is considered by many to be one of the greatest cinematographers. He also directed The Ox (Oxen) (1991), nominated for an Academy Award for Best Foreign Language Film in 1992.

Also starting his career working with Bergman, Vilgot Sjöman debuted in 1962 with The Mistress (Älskarinnan), but attracted far wider attention in Sweden when his film 491 was banned by Swedish censors due to its explicit sexual content. After cutting, it was released in 1964. Sjöman went on to cause even wider controversy, depicting sexual intercourse in his 1967 film I Am Curious (Yellow) (Jag är nyfiken – gul). The United States considered it to be pornography; it was seized by the customs and banned. When the film was eventually released in 1969, the publicity gained from the legal fight and its revolutionary graphic content drew huge crowds, making it the most successful Swedish film export ever, and the most successful foreign film in the US up to this point. Most probably it was instrumental in establishing a view of Swedish cinema – and perhaps of Swedes in general – as having a liberal attitude towards sexuality.

Another Swedish postwar filmmaker of note is Bo Widerberg. His 1963 film Raven's End (Kvarteret Korpen) and The Man on the Roof (Mannen på taket) are widely regarded as classics. His later works include The Man from Majorca (Mannen från Mallorca), The Serpent's Way (Ormens väg på hälleberget) and All Things Fair (Lust och fägring stor). Widerberg received three Academy Award nominations for Best Foreign-Language Film, Raven's End, Ådalen 31 and All Things Fair, but never won.

Jan Troell started his career as Widerberg's director of photography, but could soon debut with his own film Here's Your Life (Här har du ditt liv). He went on to direct The Emigrants (Utvandrarna) in 1971 and its sequel The New Land (Nybyggarna) the following year. The films are based on Vilhelm Moberg's epic novels about Swedish emigration to America in the 19th century, books extremely well known in Sweden. The Emigrants was nominated for four Academy Awards, including Best Director and Best Picture. Troell then went to Hollywood, where he directed Zandy's Bride, starring Gene Hackman, and Hurricane. He returned to Sweden to make The Flight of the Eagle (Ingenjör Andrées luftfärd), a film about the Swedish explorer Andrée's disastrous 1897 polar expedition. The film was nominated for an Academy Awards for best foreign language film. Later works include the controversial Il Capitano: A Swedish Requiem (Il Capitano), Hamsun, about Knut Hamsun, As White as in Snow (Så vit som en snö), and several documentaries.

In the 1960s Ingmar Bergman saw a comedic duo's variety show on Gröna Lund and told his studio "There are two funny guys down at Gröna Lund. Why don't you let them do a movie? There aren't too many funny movies these days." The duo was Hans Alfredsson and Tage Danielsson, known as Hasse & Tage, who made a movie called Svenska bilder. Their own production company AB Svenska Ord made many more movies after that one, directed either by Hasse or Tage. They include, among others Docking the Boat (Att angöra en brygga), The Apple War (Äppelkriget), The Man Who Quit Smoking (Mannen som slutade röka), Release the Prisoners to Spring (Släpp fångarne loss – det är vår!), Egg! Egg! A Hardboiled Story (Ägget är löst), The Adventures of Picasso (Picassos äventyr), SOPOR and The Simple-Minded Murder (Den enfaldige mördaren). These movies have cult status in contemporary Sweden.

1968 saw the release of Stefan Jarl's and Jan Lindqvist's documentary They Call Us Misfits (Dom kallar oss mods). The first in what would become a trilogy, it is an uncompromising account of the life of two alienated teenagers. Stefan Jarl went on to make several other celebrated documentaries in the 1980s and 1990s.

== Contemporary Swedish cinema ==
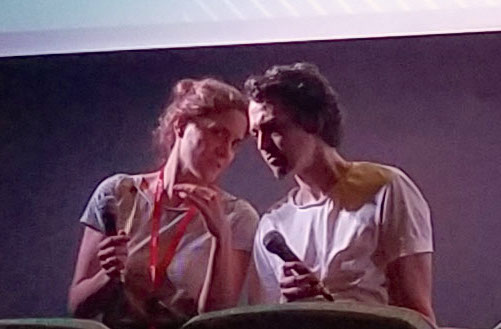
Swedish director and screenwriter Johannes Nyholm (right) presenting Koko-di Koko-da at Buenos Aires International Festival of Independent Cinema 2019.

Roy Andersson had a breakthrough with his first feature-length film, A Swedish Love Story in 1969, and was awarded four prizes at the International Film Festival in Berlin the same year. Following the financial and critical disaster of his 1975 film Giliap he took a two-decade break from film directing. In March 1996, Andersson began filming Songs from the Second Floor, that premiered at the 2000 Cannes Film Festival, winning the Special Jury Prize. Andersson's return to filmmaking was a major success with the critics, earning him five Guldbagge Awards in Sweden for best film, direction, cinematography, screenplay and sound.

Director Lasse Hallström made his feature-length film debut in 1975 with the comedy A Guy and a Gal (En kille och en tjej) featuring the well-known Swedish comic duo Magnus Härenstam and Brasse Brännström. He was the man behind most of ABBA's music videos, as well as the film ABBA: The Movie. My Life as a Dog, released in Sweden in 1985, was nominated for two 1987 Academy Awards, for directing and for adapted screenplay. In 1987, it won the Golden Globe Award for Best Foreign Language Film. Following the film's international success, Hallström has worked on American films – What's Eating Gilbert Grape, The Cider House Rules, Chocolat and Casanova, among others.

In the comedy genre Lasse Åberg has directed and also starred in some successful films that, although not praised by film critics, were box-office successes and have received cult status. The first one was Repmånad in 1979, followed by Sällskapsresan in 1980 and its four sequels. Although not part of the Sällskapsresan series, Repmånad was very similar in style, depicting an inept outsider in various situations and traditions typical for Sweden in a humorous way.

Lukas Moodysson's first feature-length film, Show Me Love (English language name for the controversial Swedish original title, Fucking Åmål) was a huge success in Sweden. The lovingly depicted teenage angst of the main characters played well with the audience and won four Guldbagge Awards in 1998. The follow-up Together (Tillsammans) (2000) was an upbeat comedy, albeit with some darkly satirical undertones, set in a 1970s Stockholm commune. But Moodysson's filmmaking then took a radically different direction. The 2002 Lilya 4-ever (Lilja 4-ever) is a dark, tragic story about trafficking in human beings, and the 2004 A Hole in My Heart (Ett hål i mitt hjärta) deals with an amateur porn movie recording, causing some controversy due to its shocking and disturbing footage.

Other young Swedish filmmakers that have seen major success in recent years include Lebanon-born director Josef Fares, with the comedies Jalla! Jalla! (2000) and Kopps (2003), and the refugee drama Zozo (2005), Iranian-born Reza Parsa with the drama Before the Storm (Före stormen) (2000), and Maria Blom, with the comedy Dalecarlians (Masjävlar) (2004).

During the late 1990s early 2000s several young filmmakers started exploring genre-films which had earlier been almost non-existent, Mikael Håfström's slasher film Strandvaskaren, Anders Banke's vampire comedy Frostbite which was the first Swedish vampire film, Anders Jacobsson's satire Evil Ed and Måns Mårlind's and Björn Stein's fantasy-thriller Storm. Non of these films proved to be successful in Sweden but went to receive both acclaim and audience in foreign countries. In 2001 the low-budget comedy-horror film Terror i Rock 'n' Roll Önsjön became Sweden's first zombie film.

More recently, Tomas Alfredson's (son of Hans Alfredson) romantic vampire film/drama film Let the Right One In (Låt den rätte komma in) (2008) received widespread acclaim from critics all around the world, becoming one of the best reviewed films of the year. In this particular tale, a bullied boy falls in love with a vampire girl who has just moved in next door. Also in the same year, director Jan Troell returns with yet another period drama, Everlasting Moments (Maria Larssons Eviga Ögonblick) (2008).

In 2009, the feature films The Girl With the Dragon Tattoo (Män som hatar kvinnor), The Girl Who Played with Fire (Flickan som lekte med elden) and The Girl Who Kicked the Hornets' Nest (Luftslottet som sprängdes) became international hits with the first film making more than $100 million worldwide. All three films were based on the hit novels of the same names that together comprise the "Millennium series" by Swedish author/journalist Stieg Larsson.

Another film maker to emerge from Sweden is Ruben Östlund. In 2017 Östlund won the Palme d'Or for The Square and in 2022 he won it again for Triangle of Sadness.

== The Swedish film industry ==
The Swedish Film Institute was founded in 1963 to support and develop the Swedish film industry. It supports Swedish filmmakings and allocates grants for production, distribution and public showing of Swedish films in their native country. It also promotes Swedish cinema internationally. Furthermore, the Institute organizes the annual Guldbagge Awards.

Through the Swedish Film Agreement, between the Swedish state and the film and media industry, the Government of Sweden, the TV companies which are party to the agreement, and Sweden's cinema owners jointly fund the Film Institute and thus, indirectly, Swedish filmmaking. The agreement usually runs for five years, and due for renewal from 1 January of the next year after expiration.

At a rate of about 20 films a year the Swedish film industry is on par with other comparable North European countries.

In Trollhättan Municipality there is a film production facility known as Trollywood; movies shot there include Show Me Love, Dancer in the Dark and Dogville. The movie studio Film i Väst centered here produces about half of Sweden's full-length films.

== See also ==
Awards

- Guldbagge Awards

Festivals

- Gothenburg Film Festival

Institutions/Organizations

- Swedish Film Institute

Lists

- List of Nordic Academy Award winners and nominees
- List of Swedish actors
- List of Swedish film directors
- Lists of Swedish films
