= Svea hund =

Svea hund, complete title Svea Hund på Göta Lejon (Svea Dog at Göta Lejon), was a Swedish variety show produced by AB Svenska Ord. It was written by Hans Alfredsson and Tage Danielsson, commonly known as Hasseåtage and directed by Tage. The show premièred on 15 February (although it had a sneak première on 9 February) 1976 on the theater Göta Lejon in Stockholm. It was the last of the three "Dog-revues"; the first was Gröna hund (Green Dog) the second being Gula Hund (Yellow Dog).

Both Hasse and Tage starred in various roles. Other cast members were Gösta Ekman, Monica Zetterlund, Lena Nyman, and Tommy Körberg. The song quartet EBBA (Lena Eriksson, Lars Bagge, Kerstin Bagge and Bo Andersson) and Gunnar Svenssons Bandhundband.

== Sketches ==
Unlike many other varieties, Svea Hund had very long sketches. The first one, "Mäster Olof eller Den Vita Sporten" (Master Olof or The White Sport), is nearly 20 minutes long. The story is set in 1945 and spoken in verse. The sketch stars Tage Danielsson as Gustaf V, Tommy Körberg as Tage Erlander, Gösta Ekman as a young Olof Palme, and Monica Zetterlund a common woman that Erlander had a child with. This child, played by Lena Nyman is chosen to be the true heir to the throne instead of Palme, who in the sketch is the true Prince. But thanks to Gustaf V's tennis partner (played by Hasse Alfredsson), a German on his way to Brazil who introduces himself as Frankenstein, although the German tennis player strongly resembles Adolf Hitler. Thanks to a machine, the prince Olof and the infant switch brains. Olof becomes a socialist and the infant turns out to be Carl XVI Gustaf. The whole sketch was a criticism to the Swedish government, who had collaborated a little too much with the establishment.

The second sketch, called "Rosornas Krig" (War of the Roses) was presented as an opera in one act with music by the Danish composer H.C. Lumbye. Set in a garden, EBBA plays a bunch of vegetables who teases Monica Zetterlund's character, a rose, because she is only pretty and not useful. They however agree that the soul needs beauty, and that even the spirit can die from famine. Soon the dandelion Tommy Körberg comes in, wanting to be accepted. But the vegetables dislike him because he is neither beautiful nor useful. The rose however falls in love with him and he feels the same way. Thanks to a bee (Gösta Ekman) the two flowers can be together. The rose states that the Dandelion is not ugly, he is handsome and yellow and he is also useful because you can make tea and coffee from him. The Dandelion also states that he is food as well, because he can be salad and his steam can be used as a trumpet. The moral of the story is that no one is truly useless. Dandelion's Swedish name is 'Maskros', which roughly translated means Wormrose, therefore the title.

The following sketch, Drama i vitt eller Himlen kan inte vänta (Drama in White or The Heaven can't wait) is set in a hospital, starring Lena Nyman as nurse Greata, Hasse Alfredsson as doctor Pubel and Tage Danielsson as the patient, named Ivar Faust. The two hospital workers try to convince Faust to sign a contract in order to "solve the population problem". He will get to live La Dolce Vita in a month before he dies on his own free will. Ivar however, prefers brown beans and the everyday life. In the end Doctor Pubel gives Ivar a cigarette so that he at least will have a shorter life.

På Söderns höjder (At the Söders heights) is a variety show within a variety show and a parody on the old Swedish pilsnermovies. This variety included, among other things, a tribute song to the pannier, Kissinger and Sadat having a contest; the one who can eat the most hideous frog will get the other one's secret documents, I Sportaffären (In the Sportsshop) which most of the time was improvised, were Lena Nyman was trying to buy a marble bag for her son but the shop assistant Gösta Ekman came with the most ridiculous accessories like a marble belt and a special marble glove. Instead of doing one of his Lindeman sketches, Hasse Alfredson instead had a number where he told a new limerick every night.

The second act begins with Mordet på Örebroexpressen - Efter en dum idé av Lars Peterson (Murder on the Örebroexpress) - After a stupid idea by Lars Peterson). A parody on Agatha Christies Murder on the Orient Express.

Stoppa Prissarna (A word play: Stop the dudes, but it just a letter different from Stop the press). The editor Cyrup (Hasse), the young journalist (Lena) and the Headliner Djuret (The Animal, played by Tommy) write exaggerated headlines and stories in order to sell single copies.

Istället för Bellman (Instead of Bellman). Gösta Ekman holds a monologue where he tells many Bellman-jokes, but switches Bellman for more modern writers, such as Bo Setterlind, Sven Stolpe and Bengt Jansson.

The last number was called Hot Dog and filled with music and some small sketches. In it, Tommy Körberg sang one of the songs that since then has become one of his trademarks. Vid Molins Fontän (At Molin Fountain), based on Les Bourgeois by Jacques Brel and Jean Corti.

== Reception and legacy ==
Svea Hund på Göta Lejon became a great success and it was later filmed for TV and has since then been released on DVD.
