= Sonya Hedenbratt =

Swedish singer and actress

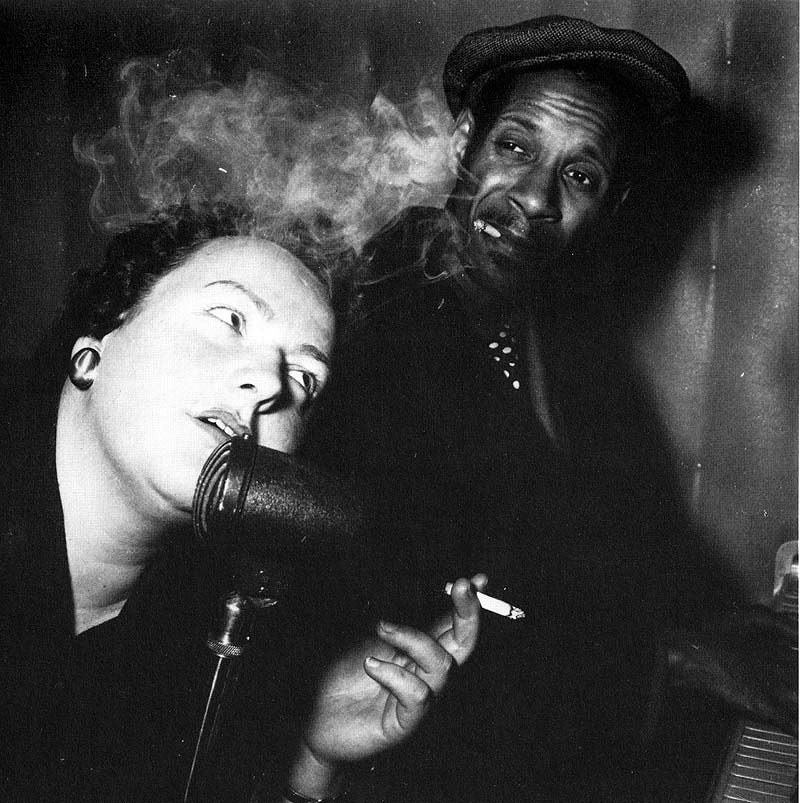
- Sonya Hedenbratt and Jimmy Woode in 1947
- Born: Sonya Elisabet Hedenbratt; 4 March 1931; Gothenburg, Sweden
- Died: 5 April 2001 (aged 70); Gothenburg, Sweden
- Occupations: Jazz singer and actor
- Years active: 1951–1999
- Spouse: Ingemar Bolin (1932-1975) (m. 1957–1975)

Sonya Elisabet Hedenbratt Bolin (4 March 1931 – 5 April 2001) was a Swedish singer and actress. She was considered one of the foremost female jazz singers in Sweden.

Hedenbratt's breakthrough as a jazz singer came when she performed at the Nalen jazz club in Stockholm in 1951. Throughout her career, she mainly worked in Gothenburg, where she was born and where she lived all her life.

She was part of the cast for several of Hasse & Tage's variety shows, including Gröna hund and Gula Hund, and she also worked with musicians such as Jan Johansson, Gösta Bernhard, Putte Wickman, Charlie Norman and Beppe Wolgers.

In the late 1960s and early 1970s, Hedenbratt performed together with Sten-Åke Cederhök in the televised popular revues (buskis) Jubel i busken and Låt hjärtat va me.

Hedenbratt's other credits as an actress include Hasse & Tage's Svenska bilder from 1964, Ingmar Bergman's Fanny and Alexander from 1982 (where she played the part of Aunt Emma), and the TV production of My Mother Gets Married by Moa Martinson.

Hedenbratt has been honoured with a memorial plaque at Liseberg, and a street in Örgryte has been named after her.

== Filmography ==
Year	Title	Role	Notes
1964	Svenska bilder	Woman Selling Vegetables	
1966	Syskonbädd 1782	Mrs. Storck	
1973	Ebon Lundin	Kallskänkan	
1980	Sverige åt svenskarna	Fair Inga-Lill	
1982	Fanny and Alexander	Aunt Emma - Ekdahlska huset	
