= Lindeman (characters) =

Lindeman is the surname of a large family of fictional characters portrayed by Swedish comedian Hans Alfredson in improvised monologues. Alfredson performed as Lindeman in the revues Gröna hund (1962), Gula hund (1964), Lådan (1966-1967) and Under dubbelgöken (1979). Every evening when the revues were played, an interviewer played by Lasse O'Månsson or Tage Danielsson would mention a topic from that day's newspaper and introduce a character called Lindeman. Alfredson would then improvise over the given topic.

Alfredson got the idea for the Lindeman sketches when he visited New York City together with Povel Ramel, and went to a so-called "instant theater" in Greenwich Village. The audience were allowed to request sketches on different topics, but Alfredson was unimpressed by the fact that when he and Ramel returned on the next evening, the actors performed the same "improvised" sketches. The different incarnations of Lindeman were thus all different, and had different occupations which in some way related to the topic of the day.

In the first series of Lindeman sketches in Gröna hund in 1962, all the characters had the first name Valfrid and were interviewed by O'Månsson. The recurring punchline for this first series was that they always ended up with that evening's Lindeman having his waistcoat stuck in his trouser zipper. In Gula hund, the Lindemen were introduced as Valfrid's son, Malte. The waistcoat-and-trousers running gag was abandoned, and it was Danielsson who acted as the interviewer from this point onwards. In Lådan and Under dubbelgöken, the Lindemen had different first names, and were occasionally female.

Alfredson and Danielsson also released a number of LP records with Lindeman sketches. In an interview in 1982, when the duo had sold 350,000 copies of their records, Alfredson declared that he would not perform the character again, saying "Lindeman is dead, and the final record was posthumous."
