= Molvig =

Molvig is a surname. Notable people with the surname include:

- Grynet Molvig (born 1942), Norwegian actress and singer
- Jon Molvig (1923–1970), Australian expressionist artist
