= Jan Olsson =

Jan Olsson may refer to:

- Jan Olsson (footballer, born 1942), Swedish footballer who played in the 1974 FIFA World Cup
- Jan Olsson (footballer, born 1944) (1944–2023), Swedish footballer who played in the 1970 FIFA World Cup
- Jan Ohlsson (born 1962), Swedish former child actor, known for his role as Emil in Emil i Lönneberga
- Jan Olsson (film scholar) (born 1952), Swedish film scholar
