= Birgitta Andersson =

Swedish actress (1933–2026)

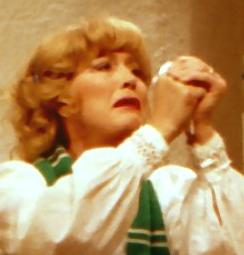
- Andersson playing Omaka par at Maximteatern in 1988
- Born: Ulla Birgitta Helena Andersson; 20 April 1933; Mariestad, Sweden
- Died: 22 February 2026 (aged 92)
- Occupations: Actress; comedian
- Years active: 1954–2010
- Spouse: Anders Bye (divorced)
- Partner: Carl Zetterström
- Children: Matti Bye; Hanna Z Gradin

Ulla Birgitta Helena Andersson Bye (20 April 1933 – 22 February 2026) was a Swedish actress and comedian.

== Career ==
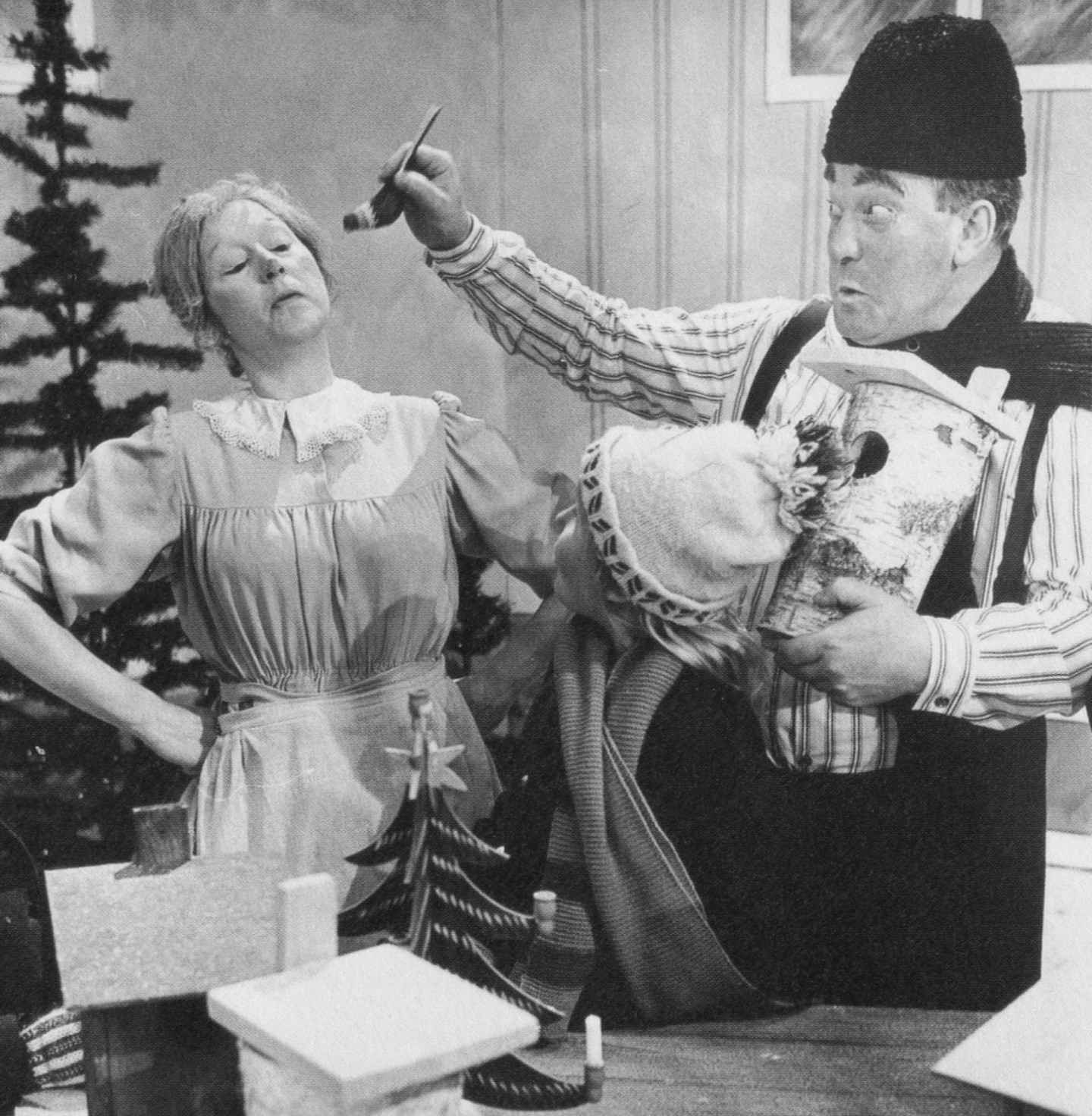
Andersson with Carl-Gustaf Lindstedt in Teskedsgumman, 1967

Andersson made her breakthrough by acting in various variety shows with Povel Ramel and Karl Gerhard. She was part of the group around Hasse & Tage, acting in revues such as Gula Hund, Docking the Boat (Att Angöra en Brygga), Spader, Madame!, The Apple War (Äppelkriget), Ägget är löst, The Adventures of Picasso (Picassos Äventyr) and Häxan Surtant.

In 1967, she portrayed Teskedsgumman (Mrs. Pepperpot) in the Swedish advent calendar with the same name. The programme became very popular and has been re-run on Swedish television. Later, she also portrayed two other characters on children's shows: Hedvig in Från A till Ö - En Resa Orden runt (From A to Ö - A Trip Around the Words) from 1974 and the small troll Daisy in Trolltider (Trolltimes) from 1979.

Andersson played Doris in the Jönssonligan movies, and she provided the Swedish voice for Lady Kluck in the Walt Disney animated movie Robin Hood and Blomhåret in Dunderklumpen.

She became a well-liked and popular actress in Sweden with a characteristic dialect (västgötska), and although her main forte was comedy, she also had more serious and character roles.

== Personal life and death ==
Andersson was born in Mariestad on 20 April 1933. She had two children, the pianist Matti Bye (born 1966) with her then-husband Anders Bye, and Hanna Z Gradin with the Swedish writer Carl Zetterström.

Andersson died on 22 February 2026, at the age of 92.

== Awards ==
Andersson received the Guldbagge Honorary Award, which is the Swedish film industry lifetime honorary award, in 2016.

== Selected filmography ==
- Dance in the Smoke (1954)
- Laugh Bomb (1954)
- The Girl in the Rain (1955)
- Moon Over Hellesta (1956)
- Guest at One's Own Home (1957)
- Mother Takes a Vacation (1957)
- Woman in a Fur Coat (1958)
- The Great Amateur (1958)
- Crime in Paradise (1959)
- No Time to Kill (1959)
- The Adventures of Picasso (1978)
- Raskenstam (1983)
