= Yellow Dog (variety show) =

Swedish variety show

Gula Hund (English title: Yellow Dog) is a Swedish variety show that had its première the 5 June 1964 on Chinateatern in Stockholm. It was written by Hans Alfredsson and Tage Danielsson and directed by Tage. Both of the writers starred in various roles. It was the second of "three dog-revues" (so called because they all have "dog" in their name). The first one being Gröna Hund (Green Dog) and the third and last one was Svea hund.

== Overview ==
The show also starred Monica Zetterlund, Birgitta Andersson, Lissi Alandh, Sonya Hedenbratt, Gösta Ekman, Mille Schmidt, Stefan Böhm, Arild Eriksen, Gals and Pals and Gunnar Svenssons kvartett.

The show was built up by sketches and songs, often with satirical humour. Among the more famous sketches are Flykten från Ålderdomshemmet (The escape from the Old Folks Home) in which Hans Alfredsson played a senile old man, the "Pitt" number, where Birgitta Andersson took her husband, played by Gösta Ekman, to the doctor because he couldn't stop saying the word pitt (Swedish slang for penis) and the Mahatma Ekman number, in which Gösta Ekman portrayed a kind of guru who claimed that we "have to be friends with the things" only to have every object on stage work against him in a slapstick number. The show also contained a number between Tage Danielsson and Lissi Alandh called I Friska Naturn (In The Healthy Nature) also known as Nature Morte. Dressed in 18th-century style clothing they sing a song about a picnic they have in the nature who has been destroyed by toxic and different kinds of pollution, among them a Nuclear Powerplant. Later in his life, Tage would become a spokesperson against pollution in general and Nuclear Power in particular.

It was filmed for television in 1966 and has since then been released on DVD and it is considered a Hasseåtage classic.

A shortened, English version called "Yellow Dog" was shown as Sweden's contribution to Montreux in 1965.
