= Margaretha Krook =

Swedish actress (1925–2001)

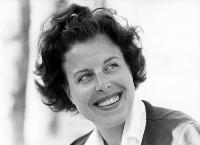
- Margaretha Krook, early 1960s.
- Born: Margareta Knutsdotter Krook; 15 October 1925; Stockholm, Sweden
- Died: 7 May 2001 (aged 75); Stockholm, Sweden
- Occupation: Actress
- Years active: 1949–2001
- Spouse: Stig Hammar (m. 1956–1981)

Margaretha Knutsdotter Krook (15 October 1925 – 7 May 2001) was a Swedish stage and film actress. She won the Eugene O'Neill Award in 1974. In 1976, she won the Guldbagge Award for Best Actress for the film Release the Prisoners to Spring. She was awarded the Illis quorum in 1995 for her performance of Gertrude Stein at the Royal Dramatic Theatre.

== Selected filmography ==
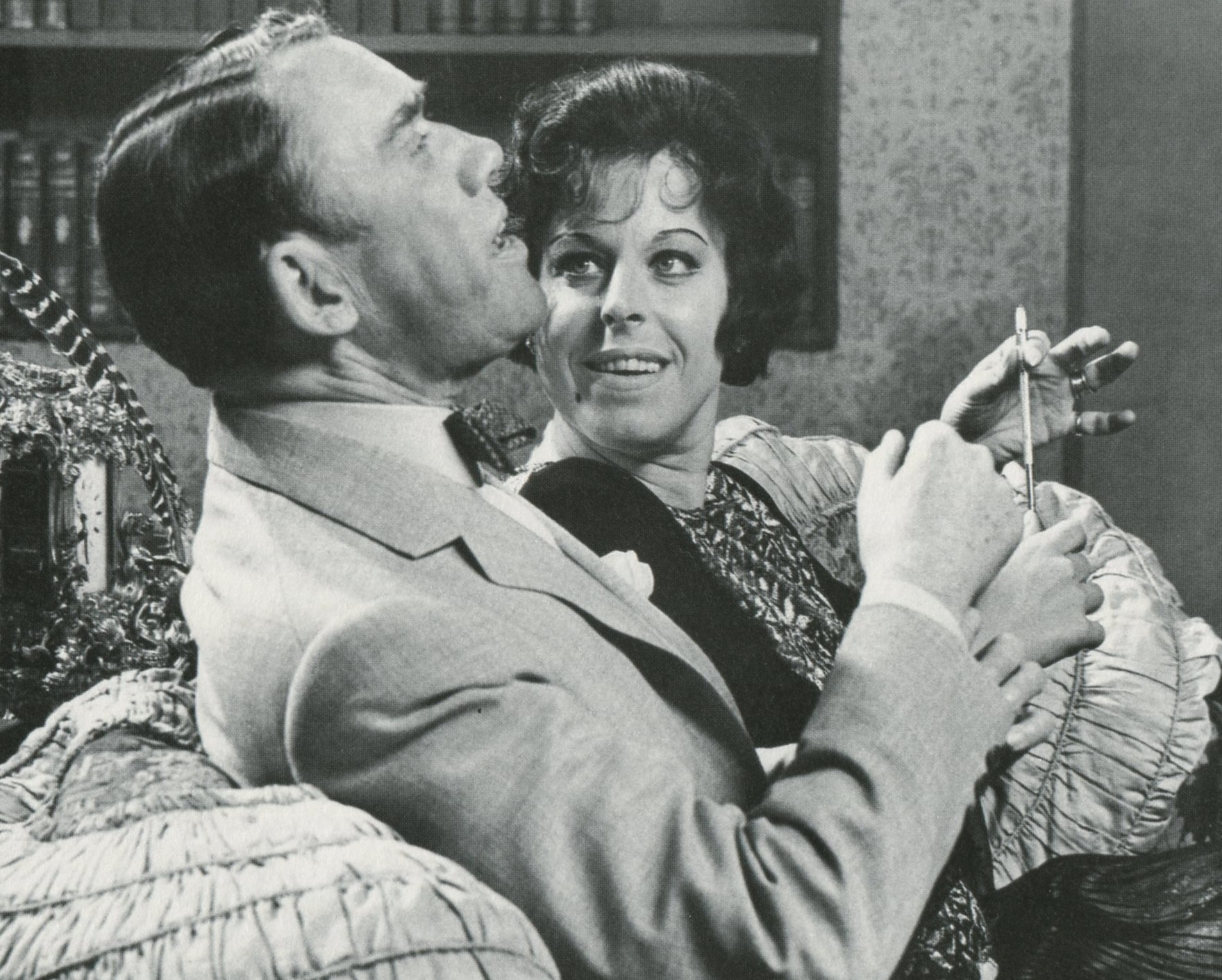
Margaretha Krook and Holger Löwenadler in 1963.

- 1949: Only a Mother – Berta
- 1951: Miss Julie – Governess
- 1953: Barabbas – Woman in Robbers' Cave (uncredited)
- 1954: Storm Over Tjurö – Augusta
- 1954: Karin Månsdotter – Karin's Sister (uncredited)
- 1954: Salka Valka – Sigurlina Jonsdottir
- 1958: Brink of Life – Dr. Larsson (uncredited)
- 1961: Swedenhielms (TV Movie) – Marta Boman
- 1961: Lita på mej älskling – Mrs. Nilsson
- 1963: Adam och Eva – Ms. Nyfröjd
- 1964: Swedish Wedding Night – Mary
- 1964: Svenska bilder – Mrs. Kronback
- 1966: JAG – Bus Driver
- 1966: Träfracken – Nurse Ann Wahlman
- 1966: Persona – The Doctor
- 1966: Adamsson i Sverige – Astrid Samuelsson
- 1968: Bombi Bitt och jag (TV Series) – Franskan
- 1969: Bokhandlaren som slutade bada – Amelie Arbel
- 1970: Ministern – The Mother
- 1970: Den magiska cirkeln – Ingvar's Mother
- 1972: The Man Who Quit Smoking – Prostitute
- 1973: Bröllopet – Sofia Långsjö
- 1974: Vita nejlikan eller Den barmhärtige sybariten – Margit
- 1975: Monismanien 1995 – Prosecutor
- 1975: Release the Prisoners to Spring – Rådmans dotter
- 1976: Drömmen om Amerika – Mrs. Alm
- 1978: The Adventures of Picasso – Doña Maria
- 1978: A Walk in the Sun – Ellen
- 1980: Sverige åt svenskarna – Canteen Svea
- 1981: Sopor – Gösta Bohman
- 1981: Snacka går ju... – Gun
- 1982: Brusten himmel – Grandma
- 1984: Sköna juveler – Old Woman
- 1985: De flyvende djævle – Hildegarde Altenburg
- 1986: Morrhår och ärtor – Konsulinnan Ahlhagen
- 1989: Jönssonligan på Mallorca – Germann
- 1990: Den hemliga vännen – The wife
- 1992: The Best Intentions – Blenda Bergman
- 1997: Rika barn leka bäst – Bordellkonsulten
- 2000: Gossip – Ingrid Seth
- 2000: Dinosaur – Eema (voice)
- 2002: Karlsson på taket – Miss Hildur Bock (voice)
