= Carl Adam Lewenhaupt =

Swedish noble and businessman

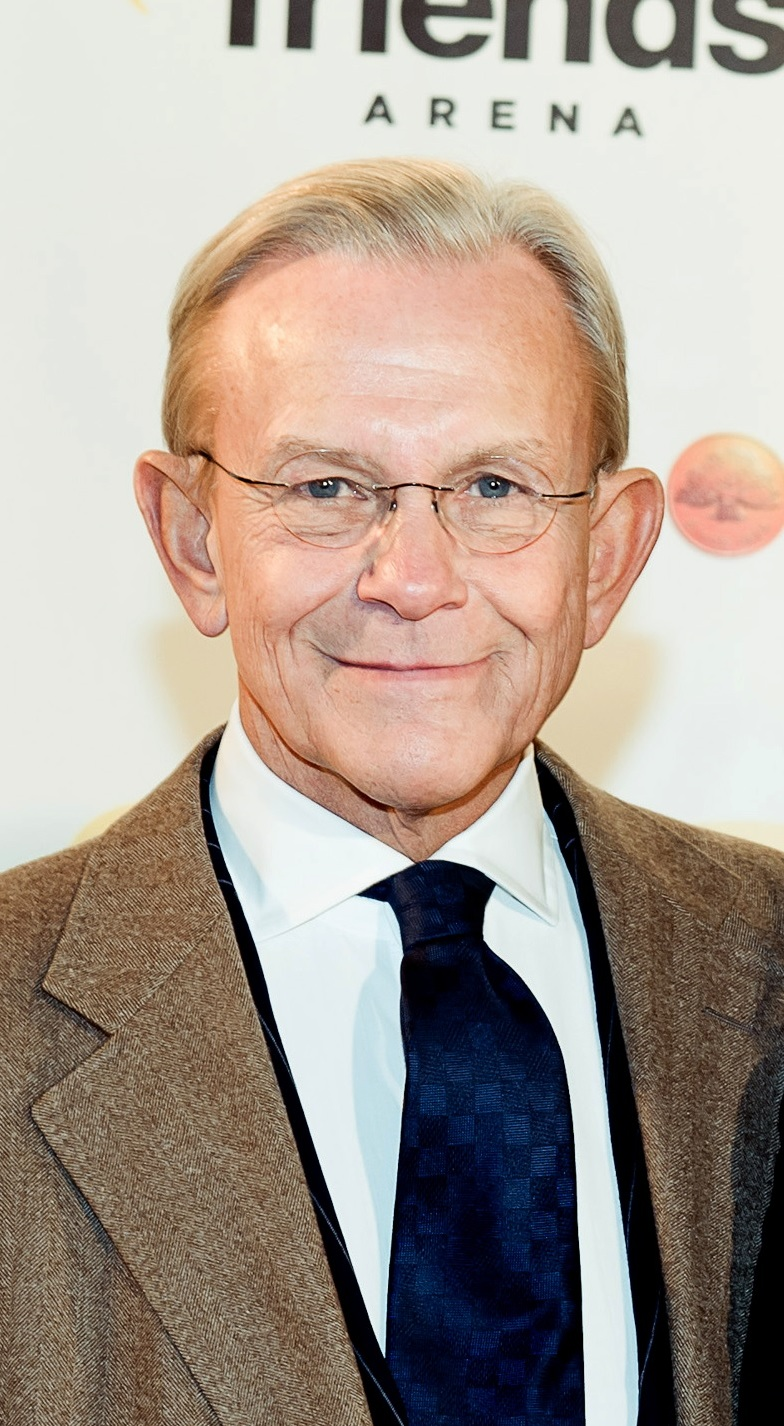
- Carl Adam Lewenhaupt, 2012
- Born: 1 August 1947; Stockholm, Sweden
- Died: 28 February 2017 (aged 69)
- Occupations: Count, businessman and restaurateur
- Spouses: Katarina Svanstein (m. 1978–1982) Grynet Molvig (m. 1983–1996) Susanne Johansson-Ekman (m. 1997–2001) Lee Haeng-Wha (m. 2004–2017)

Carl Adam Göstasson "Noppe" Lewenhaupt (1 August 1947 – 28 February 2017) was a Swedish count, businessman and restaurateur.

He was the son of Count Gösta Lewenhaupt and his wife Christina Lewenhaupt. After studies at Sigtunaskolan he worked at a bank and warehouse in London and New York City, in the mid 1990s he created and started Geddesholm Callcenter, one of Sweden's largest call centers, these days better known as Avesta teletjänst, which he sold to a buyer in 2002.

The same year he along with Erik Lallerstedt started the members only club Noppe at Östermalm in Stockholm.

Carl Adam Lewenhaupt was at the time of his death married to Lee Haeng-Wha whom he married in 2004. He had earlier been married to Katarina Svanstein 1978–82, actress Grynet Molvig 1983–96, and Susanne Johansson-Ekman 1997–2001.

He was a friend of the Swedish King Carl XVI Gustaf since they both were young children.

Lewenhaupt was reported missing on 28 February 2017, and was found dead in the water outside Gärdet in Stockholm the next day. It is still unclear when and how he ended up in the water.
