= Carl von Schewen =

Swedish landowner (1871–1954)

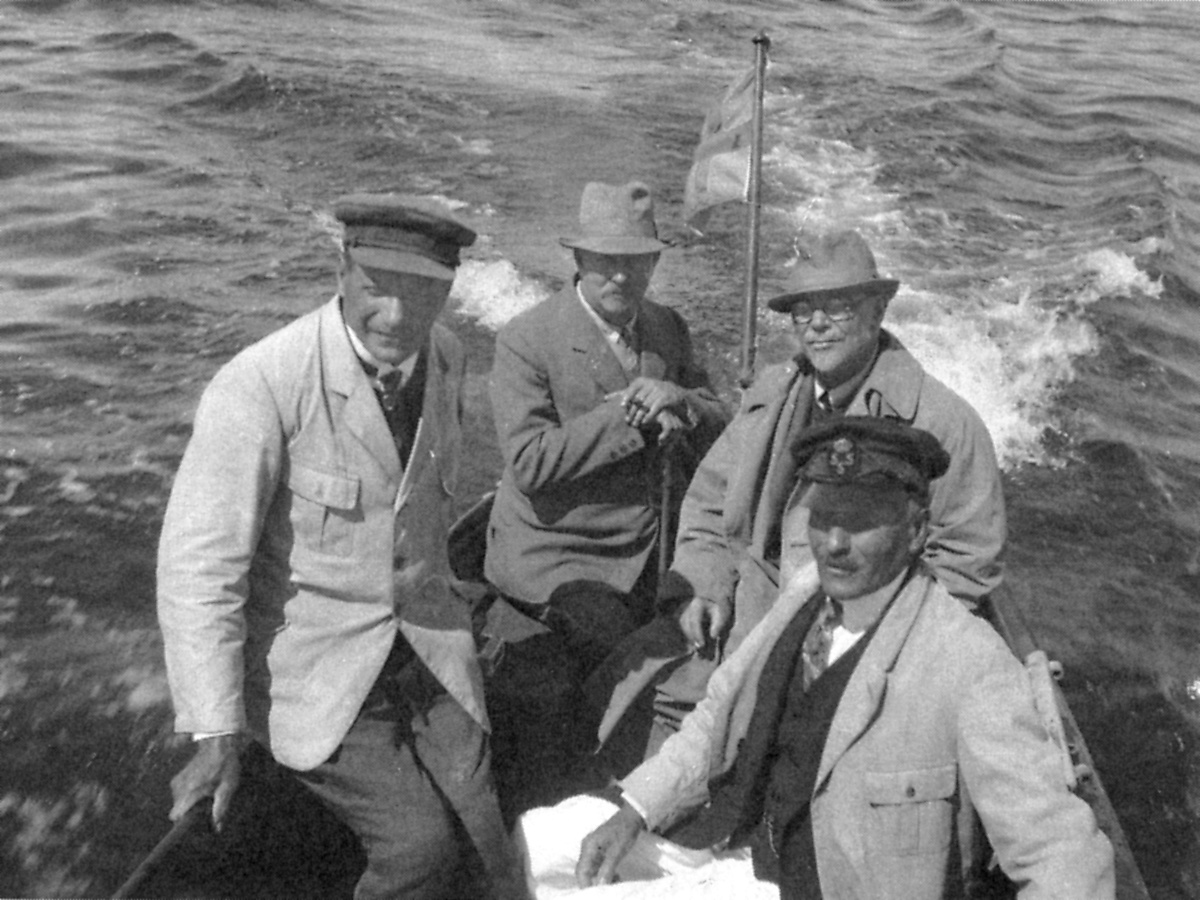

Carl Fredrik Mauritz von Schewen (16 January 1871 – 31 March 1954) was a Swedish landowner. He is best known as inspiration character in Evert Taube's song "Calle Schewens vals". He had a summer house at Håtö Svansar in the Stockholm archipelago, and there the members of Pelarorden, which he also was a member of, gathered. He played himself in the film I Roslagens famn.
