= Katedralskolan, Linköping =

School in Linköping, Sweden

Coordinates: 58.415808°N 15.615778°E

The Cathedral School
- Swedish: Katedralskolan; Latin: Gymnasium Lincopense

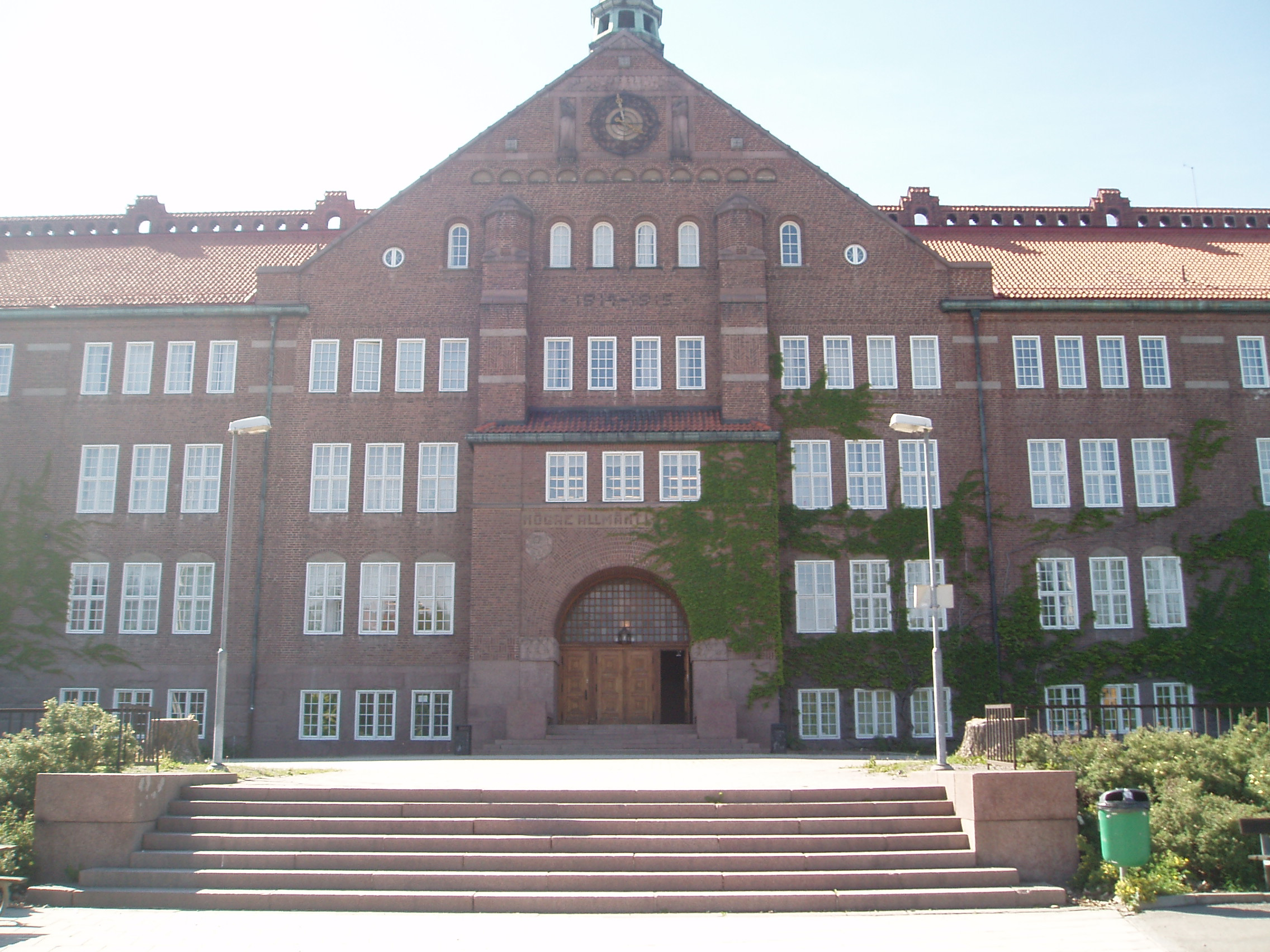

Information
- Motto: Tradition och Utveckling (Tradition and Development)
- Established: 1627; 399 years ago
- Enrollment: c.1300
- Rival: Berzeliusskolan
- Website: www.linkoping.se/katedral

Katedralskolan (literally The Cathedral School), in Linköping, Sweden, is a secondary school, run by Linköping Municipality, which offers Swedish programmes in social sciences and natural sciences as well as (since 2001) the International Baccalaureate Diploma Programme. The school is located in the neighbourhood of Vasastaden.

Founded in 1627, it is the fifth oldest gymnasium in Sweden, after the Rudbeckianska gymnasiet in Västerås, Thomasgymnasiet in Strängnäs, Katedralskolan in Uppsala and Katedralskolan in Lund. Its name comes from its proximity to Linköping Cathedral.

The current building, completed in 1914, underwent renovation in 1999. The school has a reputation for its assembly hall, which features wall paintings of Gustav II Adolf, king at the time of the school's foundation, and of Aristotle. This building was designed by Axel Brunskog in the national romantic style.

Katedralskolan is proud of its traditions but seeks to stay up to date, as reflected in its motto: "tradition and development". Its affinity for tradition is evident in its logo which says Gymnasium Lincopense, the Latin name used at the time when Katedralskolan was the only school in Linköping.

In accordance with its commitment to international cooperation, the school also maintains exchange programmes with schools in Herborn, Germany, the lycée de l'Elorn, Landerneau, France and Scarborough, England, Linköping's sister city Joensuu, Finland, and Spain.

The school has many societies. Sällskapet för vitterhet och hävd – Eranos (known as VH-E), dedicated to history, literature and philosophy, has existed in the school since 1795 and counts many famous names amongst its members, such as Jöns Jacob Berzelius and Tage Danielsson.

The school enjoys a fierce rivalry with nearby Berzeliusskolan, which ironically takes its name from a Katedralskolan alumnus: Jöns Jacob Berzelius.

== Notable alumni ==
- Jöns Jacob Berzelius, one of the fathers of modern chemistry
- André Oscar Wallenberg, banker, founder of SEB and patriarch of the Wallenberg family
- Hugo Theorell, Nobel Laureate for his enzyme research
- Tage Danielsson, author, actor and film director; a statue of him stands just outside the school grounds
- Lars Winnerbäck, singer and songwriter
- Anders Tegnell, physician and state epidemiologist of Sweden
