= Spader, Madame! =

1969 Swedish variety show

Spader, Madame! is a Swedish variety show that had its première on 10 January 1969 at the Oscarsteatern in Stockholm. It was written by Hans Alfredson and Tage Danielsson, the duo known as Hasse & Tage, and directed by Danielsson. Both of the writers starred in the show; Hasse played the banker Falkenström and Tage friherr von Löwenskiöld.

The show also starred Monica Zetterlund, Birgitta Andersson, Grynet Molvig, Martin Ljung, Gösta Ekman, Fatima Ekman, Fina Kören and Gunnar Svenssons Salongsorkester.

The show was later adapted for television, using Sturehov Manor near Stockholm as the setting. This has been released on DVD and the film soundtrack has been released for both LP and CD.

== Plot ==
The story is set at the beginning of the 19th century, an era that Hasse & Tage thought was very much like the 1960s. A group of people from the upper classes has withdrawn to a place in the country where they plan to live for a couple of days, listening to Schubert's music and simply enjoying life.

The plan goes very wrong however, when most of the things go wrong and the company runs out of food and drinks in a couple of days.

== Music ==
All the music in the show was based on compositions originally written by Franz Schubert, but with new lyrics and arrangements by Hans Alfredsson and Tage Danielsson. The songs used in the show are as follows:

First Act

- Forellen (The Trout), sung by Monica Zetterlund

(Die Forelle, D. 550).

- Sång, som handlar om sig själv (Song, that is about itself), sung by Egil and the men

(Nachthelle, D 892)

- Herdens sång om herdens sång om herden (The shepherd's song about the shepherd's song about the shepherd), sung by Martin Ljung

(8th symphony 'The Unfinished', Second Movement)

- Du går an (You're okay), sung by Grynet Molvig and Tage Danielsson

(Octet in F major, Fourth Movement, opus 166 D. 803)

- Pigornas Kurt (Kurt of the maids), sung by Monica Zetterlund

(Theme from the 6th Symphony, First Movement)

- Vid sybågen, aka Här sitter jag i värmen (At the Embroidery, or Here I sit in the warmth), sung by Grynet Molvig

(Der Lindenbaum, op 89, d. 911)

- Spader, Madame! (A word play, Spader Madame can be thought of as The Queen of Spades, but the sentence actually means "I'm going crazy, madame"), sung by all

(5th Symphony, 3rd Movement)

Second Act

- Den gode vilden or Lilla svarta Saras dans (The Good Savage, or Little black Sara's dance), performed by Fatima Ekman and chorus

(Nr. 3, from 3 Klavierstücke, D.946).

- Längtans blåa blomma (The Longings blue flower), sung by Ulla Hallin and chorus

(Rosamunde, Entr'acte No 2)

- Blodvisan (The Bloodsong), sung by Grynet Molvig

(Waltz No. 6 from Twelve Waltzes, op. 18, D. 145).

- Donna Juanita, sung by Monica Zetterlund.

(6th Symphony, Second Movement).

- Hittebarnet (The abandoned child), sung by Monica Zetterlund and chorus

(First and Second waltzes from Twelve Waltzes, op. 18, D. 145).

- Solen är en ball kula (The Sun is a groovy marble), sung by all

(Overture from Rosamunde).

- Lyckan är alltid kort (Happiness is always short), sung by all

(Theme from the Unfinished 8th Symphony, First movement).

== Reception ==
The stage play, although popular with the public, got very bad reviews from the press. The televised version, however, gave the show recognition among both public and critics. Those who had been negative about the stage play and written harsh reviews on it gave a very positive response to the other version of the show.

The show was revived at Malmö stadsteater in 1977 and at the Göteborg City Theatre in 1986.
