= The Apple War =

1971 Swedish film

- Theatrical release poster
- Directed by: Tage Danielsson
- Written by: Hans Alfredson; Tage Danielsson
- Starring: Gösta Ekman; Hans Alfredsson; Tage Danielsson; Monica Zetterlund; Max von Sydow
- Cinematography: Lars Svanberg
- Edited by: Wic Kjellin; Thomas Holéwa
- Music by: Evert Taube
- Distributed by: AB Svensk Filmindustri
- Release date: 18 December 1971
- Running time: 103 minutes
- Country: Sweden
- Language: Swedish
- Box office: SEK 9.8 million (Sweden)

The Apple War (Swedish: Äppelkriget) is a 1971 Swedish comedy-drama film directed by Tage Danielsson, starring Gösta Ekman, Hans Alfredson, Tage Danielsson, Monica Zetterlund and Max von Sydow. The political theme of the film is the battle between nature on the one hand and commercialisation and industrialisation on the other set to exploit and ultimately destroy land and natural resources. The film can also be seen as an early criticism of globalisation as it depicts foreign, and large scale, capitalist investors and entrepreneurs as exploiters working side by side with domestic, small scale, capitalists.

The songs in The Apple War are composed and written by Evert Taube, who also makes a cameo in the film as the old man who dances with Monica Zetterlund at the end party, and while there also recites a part of one of his most famous songs, Calle Schewens vals, performed by the cast in the same scene at the end. Winner of three Guldbagge Awards, The Apple War is a popular cult film in Sweden, and referred to as a "Hasse & Tage" film due to the creators Tage Danielsson and Hasse Alfredson.

== Plot ==
A Swiss businessman wants to buy land in southern Sweden for a gigantic amusement park, his new project called "Deutschneyland" (a wordplay of Deutschland and Disneyland). Some of the locals dislike the idea, including the magically talented Lindberg family, and work to frustrate the development plans.

== Cast ==
- Per Grundén as Jean Volkswagner
- Gösta Ekman as Sten Wall
- Per Waldvik as Hans Nilsson
- Yvonne Lombard as Kerstin Gustafson
- Sten Kärrby as Tore Gustafson
- Monica Zetterlund as Anna Lindberg
- Håkan Serner as Eberhard Lindberg
- Hans Alfredson as Severin Lindberg
- Birgitta Andersson as Luft-Hanna Lindberg
- Anne-Marie Nyman as Agnes Lindberg
- Nils Ahlroth as Gustav Lindberg / jätte
- Nils Nittel as Bert Lindberg
- Mariette Fransson as Janet Lindberg / skogsrå
- Martin Ljung as Åke Lindberg
- Max von Sydow as Roy Lindberg
- Tage Danielsson as Bernhard Lindberg
- Sture Ericson as Larsson i Tofta
- Ingvar Ottoson as Werner Affeman
- Gus Dahlström as Film director
- Tomas Alfredson as Count
- Karl Erik Flens as Valfrid Paulsson

== Songs by Evert Taube used in the soundtrack ==
In order:

- "Änglamark" (instrumental; at the beginning of the film)
- "Mirrabooka marsch" (instrumental)
- "Solig morgon" (instrumental)
- "Sjösala vals" (hummed by a woman off camera)
- "Calle Lång dansar portugis" (instrumental)
- "Diktaren och Tiden" (instrumental)
- "Julius och Mariella" (instrumental)
- "Byssan lull" (instrumental)
- "Möte i monsunen" (instrumental)
- "Stockholmsmelodi", performed by Evert Taube (recited)
- "Pierina eller Blå anemonerna", performed by Thord Carlsson, Folke Eng, Lars Malgefors, Håkan Norlen and Lillemor Lysell
- "Fritiof Anderssons paradmarsch" (instrumental)
- "Bal på Skeppsholmen" (instrumental- "domino effect" sequence)
- "Min älskling (du är som en ros)" (instrumental)
- "Nocturne" (instrumental - Herr Volkswagner goes to sleep)
- "Calle Schewens vals", performed by Martin Ljung, Max von Sydow, Birgitta Andersson, Monica Zetterlund, Hans Alfredson and Evert Taube (at the outdoor wedding/summer party/picnic)
- "Änglamark", performed by Sven-Bertil Taube (at the end credits)

== Reception ==
The film was the second highest-grossing film in Sweden released in 1971 behind Emil i Lönneberga.

== Awards ==
The film won the Swedish Film Institute's Guldbagge Award ("Golden Beetle") award in 1972 in three categories:

- Best Film
- Best Director - Tage Danielsson
- Best Actress - Monica Zetterlund
