= Hugo Theorell =

Swedish biochemist

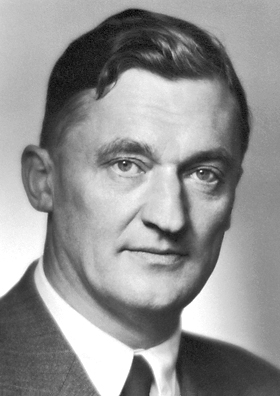
- Born: 6 July 1903; Linköping, Sweden
- Died: 15 August 1982 (aged 79); Stockholm, Sweden
- Awards: Nobel Prize in Physiology or Medicine (1955)
- Scientific career
- Fields: Biochemistry

Axel Hugo Theodor Theorell ForMemRS (6 July 1903 – 15 August 1982) was a Swedish scientist and Nobel Prize laureate in medicine.

== Early life and education ==
He was born in Linköping as the son of Thure Theorell and his wife Armida Bill. Theorell went to Secondary School at Katedralskolan in Linköping and passed his examination there on 23 May 1921. In September, he began to study medicine at the Karolinska Institute and in 1924 he graduated as a Bachelor of Medicine. He then spent three months studying bacteriology at the Pasteur Institute in Paris under Professor Albert Calmette. In 1930 he obtained his M.D. degree with a theory on the lipids of the blood plasma, and was appointed professor in physiological chemistry at the Karolinska Institute.

== Career ==
Theorell, who dedicated his entire career to enzyme research, received the Nobel Prize in Physiology or Medicine in 1955 for discovering oxidoreductase enzymes and their effects. His contribution also consisted of the theory of the toxic effects of sodium fluoride on the cofactors of crucial human enzymes. In 1936 he was appointed Head of the newly established Biochemical Department of the Nobel Medical Institute, the first researcher related to the Institute to be awarded a Nobel Prize. His work had led to pioneering progress on alcohol dehydrogenases, enzymes that break down alcohol in the liver and other tissues. He received honorary degrees at universities in France, Belgium, Brazil and the United States. He was a member of the American Academy of Arts and Sciences and the United States National Academy of Sciences, and an International Member of the American Philosophical Society.

== Personal life ==
Theorell was the father of the physician-scientist Töres Theorell (b. 1942) and the grandfather of Tobias Theorell (b. 1969).

He died in Stockholm and is interred in Norra begravningsplatsen (The Northern Cemetery) alongside his wife, Elin Margit Elisabeth (née Alenius) Theorell, a distinguished pianist and harpsichordist who died in 2002.
