= 12th Guldbagge Awards =

Annual Swedish film awards ceremony

- Date: 13 September 1976
- Site: Operaterrassen, Stockholm, Sweden

Highlights
- Best Picture: Release the Prisoners to Spring

The 12th Guldbagge Awards ceremony, presented by the Swedish Film Institute, honored the best Swedish films of 1975 and 1976, and took place on 13 September 1976. Release the Prisoners to Spring directed by Tage Danielsson was presented with the award for Best Film.

== Awards ==
- Best Film: Release the Prisoners to Spring by Tage Danielsson
- Best Director: Jan Halldoff for Polare
- Best Actor: Toivo Pawlo for Hello Baby
- Best Actress: Margaretha Krook for Release the Prisoners to Spring
