= The Man Who Quit Smoking =

- Film poster
- Directed by: Tage Danielsson
- Written by: Tage Danielsson
- Starring: Gösta Ekman; Grynet Molvig; Carl-Gustaf Lindstedt
- Cinematography: Lars Björne
- Music by: Gunnar Svensson
- Distributed by: Svensk Filmindustri
- Release date: 16 December 1972
- Running time: 99 minutes
- Country: Sweden
- Languages: Swedish; French
- Box office: SEK 6.5 million (Sweden)

The Man Who Quit Smoking (Swedish: Mannen som slutade röka) is a 1972 Swedish comedy film directed by Tage Danielsson, starring Gösta Ekman, Grynet Molvig, Carl-Gustaf Lindstedt and Gunn Wållgren. The film is known as a Hasse & Tage film and is a great cult classic in Sweden.

== Plot ==
The plot focuses on Dante Alighieri, a young man who loves smoking. When his father dies, Dante inherits 17 million kronor on one special condition: He must give up smoking in 14 days and then stay smoke-free for an entire year. If he fails, his uncle inherits the 17 million kronor instead. Dante has a living hell while trying to quit, and hires a private detective agency called Little Secret Service who he gives a free hand to prevent him from smoking. At the same time, his uncle (who has taken up smoking himself) does everything he can to make Dante smoke again.

== Production ==
Tage Danielsson originally came up with the idea for this movie when he himself decided to quit smoking. If he made a movie about the subject he thought it would be too embarrassing if he ever started again. Another inspiration was Dante Alighieri's Divine Comedy. The main character is named Dante and his loved one is called Beatrice, just as in The Divine Comedy. The plot is also divided into three parts: Inferno, Purgatorio and Paradiso.

== Cast ==
- Gösta Ekman as Dante Alighieri
- Grynet Molvig as Beatrice Morris
- Toivo Pawlo as Hugo Alighieri
- Olga Georges-Picot as Gunhild
- Holger Löwenadler as Knut-Birger
- Gunn Wållgren as Aunt Gunhild
- Olle Hilding as Sjöström
- Carl-Gustaf Lindstedt as Detective
- Pierre Lindstedt as Detective
- Marianne Stjernqvist as Mrs. Jonsson-Varin
- Jan-Olof Strandberg as Doctor
- Raymond Bussières as The French detective
- Margaretha Krook as Prostitute
- Jytte Abildstrøm as Lady
- Stig Ossian Ericson as Hypnotist doctor
- Manne Grünberger as Major
- Putte Kock as TV commentator
- Meta Velander as Press office lady

== Reception ==
The film was the fourth highest-grossing film released in Sweden in 1972.

== Awards ==
At the 9th Guldbagge Awards in 1973 Gösta Ekman won the award for Best Actor.

== See also ==
- Dante Alighieri and the Divine Comedy in popular culture
