= Calle Schewens vals =

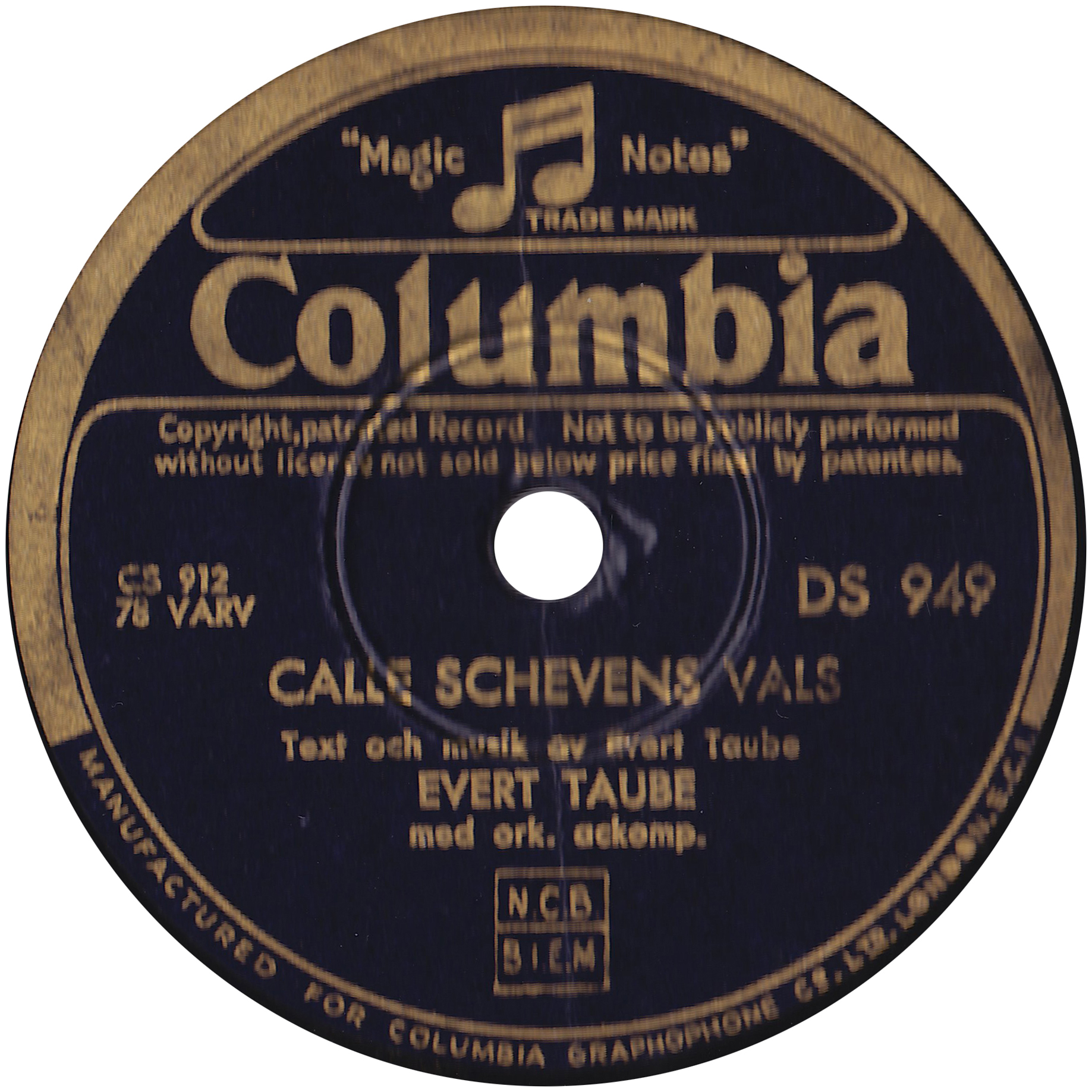
- 1936 grammophone record

Song by Evert Taube
- Published: 1931
- Released: 1932
- Songwriter(s): Evert Taube

Calle Schewens vals (Calle Schewen's waltz) is a 1932 Swedish waltz written by Evert Taube.

When Taube wanted to be member of the secret society Pelarorden in 1931, he was stumped until Albert Engström ordered him to write a song about the "Stockholm archipelago, summer air, and darkening nights in July at Roslagen". Carl von Schewen, who also was member of Pelarorden, was immortalized as Calle Schewen. The song was published in the songbook Den Gyldene Fredens folianter in 1934.

== See also ==
- Den svenska sångboken
