= Släpp fångarne loss, det är vår! =

- Directed by: Tage Danielsson
- Written by: Tage Danielsson
- Starring: Tage Danielsson; Ernst-Hugo Järegård; Margaretha Krook
- Cinematography: Lars Björne
- Release date: 6 December 1975
- Running time: 97 minutes
- Country: Sweden
- Language: Swedish

Släpp fångarne loss, det är vår! is a 1975 Swedish comedy film directed by Tage Danielsson. At the 12th Guldbagge Awards the film won the awards for Best Film and Best Actress (Margaretha Krook).

The film stars Ernst-Hugo Järegård as the prisoner Harald Hansson, a break-in expert, who one day meets Frida and her friend and learns how to bake cookies. He considers a career change, especially when he falls in love with Flora, the daughter of a city judge.

The film is a cult comedy by Hasse & Tage. Memorable scenes in the film are the car chase with Järegård, the musical show number in the cell performed by Jan Malmsjö, and the show number carried out simultaneously in the exercise yard by Järegård, Malmsjö and Urban Sahlin; and practically every scene with Ekman as the prison governor.

The film was meant to comment on the criminal system and view of criminals in society (both in Sweden and worldwide).

== Cast ==
- Ernst-Hugo Järegård as Harald Hansson
- Lena Nyman as Frida
- Tage Danielsson as her friend
- Gösta Ekman as the prison governor; Frans
- Margaretha Krook as Flora, the judge's daughter
- Jan Malmsjö as "the Professor"
- Georg Årlin as the judge
- Hans Alfredson as Erlandsson
- Urban Sahlin as "the Monkey"
