= Hasse & Tage =

Swedish comedy duo

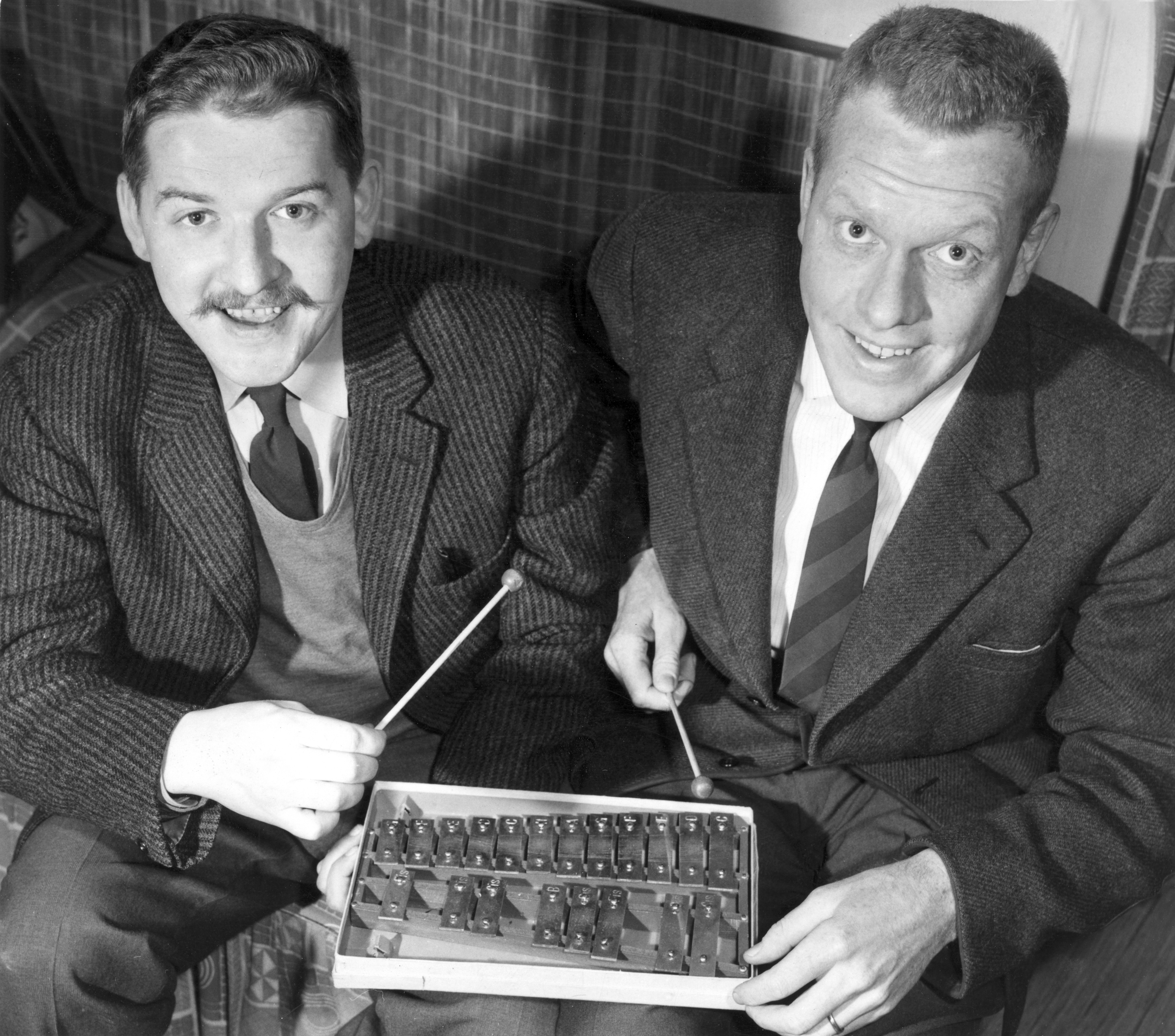
Hasse & Tage in 1959.

Hasse & Tage (Swedish: Hasse och Tage) were a popular Swedish comedy duo featuring Hans "Hasse" Alfredson and Tage Danielsson. They are sometimes known as Hasseåtage, a spelling created by the Swedish press in the 1960s, but never used by the duo themselves.

== History ==
Alfredson and Danielsson first met each other when they were both working at Sveriges Radio back in the 1950s, first at different departments and programmes. But one day they were put on the same project and they soon became close friends. After this they made many radio sketches at Sveriges Radio and the variety show Doktor Kotte slår till eller Siv Olson.

Along with Povel Ramel, Cornelis Vreeswijk and the many contributors to Hasse & Tage's radio (later, TV) show "Mosebacke monarki", Hasse & Tage was a popular act in Swedish entertainment of the 1950s, 1960s and early 1970s, sometimes a bit reminiscent of Monty Python. Their work is still well-known in Sweden.

In 1961 they started the entertainment company AB Svenska Ord ('Swedish Words Ltd') which subsequently produced all their shows and films, productions that have gained cult status in Sweden. They often both acted in their productions as well as directed (separately or together) and wrote their material themselves. They gave their work a special trademark (with for example costumes, set decorations, and by using the same actors in many projects) and a feeling that was totally their own and unmistakable for Swedish audiences.

Their productions are also very often ripe with political insight, most often with a libertarian socialist and environmentalist view, using a unique type of humour as a liberating force for their message.

People who regularly worked with the duo and therefore are associated with it include actors Gösta Ekman and Lena Nyman, as well as artist and animator Per Åhlin.

The comedy duo lasted until Danielsson's death in 1985.

The Hasse & Tage museum commemorates their work in Tomelilla, Sweden.

== Productions ==
- 1982 - Fröken Fleggmans mustasch ("Miss Fleggman's Mustache") (TV-theatre)
- 1982 - Den Enfaldige Mördaren ("The Simple-Minded Murderer") (film)
- 1981 - SOPOR ("GARBAGE") (film)
- 1980 - Under dubbelgöken (variety) (TV)
- 1978 - Picassos äventyr (The Adventures of Picasso) (film)
- 1976 - Svea hund (variety) (TV)
- 1975 - Ägget är löst ("The egg is loose") (film)
- 1975 - Släpp fångarne loss - det är vår! (Release the Prisoners to Spring) (film)
- 1973 - Glaset i örat ("The glass in the ear") (variety) (TV)
- 1972 - Mannen som slutade röka (The man who Quit Smoking) (film)
- 1971 - Äppelkriget ("The Apple War") (film)
- 1970 - 88-öresrevyn ("The 88 öre revue") (variety) (TV)
- 1970 - Spader, Madame! (TV)
- 1969 - Spader, Madame! (variety; stage version)
- 1968 - Lådan ("The box (the drawer)") (variety) (TV)
- 1968 - I huvet på en gammal gubbe ("Out of an Old Man's Head") (film)
- 1965 - Att angöra en brygga (Docking the Boat) (film)
- 1964 - Svenska bilder (Swedish Portraits) (film)
- 1964 - Gula hund (Yellow Dog) (variety) (TV)
- 1963 - Hålligång (variety) (TV)
- 1962 - Gröna hund ("Green dog") (variety)
- 1959 - Doktor Kotte slår till eller Siv Olson ("Dr. Kotte strikes again or Siv Olson") (variety)
