= Grynet Molvig =

Norwegian actress and singer (born 1942)

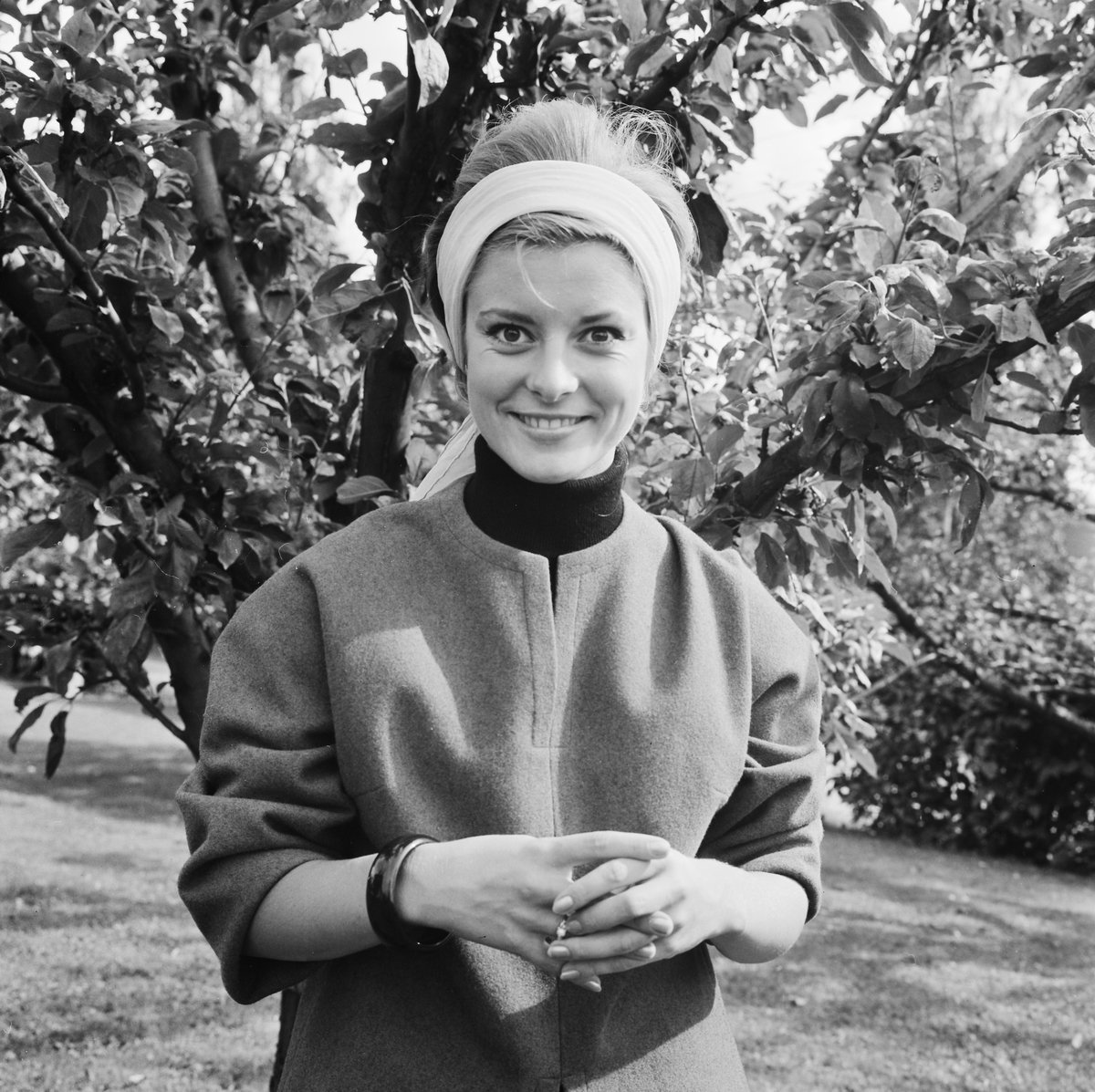
- Grynet Molvig in 1964
- Born: Ann-Kristin Molvig; 23 December 1942 (age 83); Rygge
- Occupations: Actress, singer
- Years active: 1961–present
- Spouse(s): Krister Henriksson (divorced); Alfred Janson; Carl Adam Lewenhaupt (1984–96)

Ann-Kristin "Grynet" Molvig (born 23 December 1942) is a Norwegian actress and singer. She made her name as a singer in the 1960, with acts such as Kjell Karlsen and Willy Andresen. Later, she also started performing in Sweden, often together with Povel Ramel. At the same time, she also acted in films, both in Norway and Sweden.

In 1967, she won the award for Best Actress at the 5th Moscow International Film Festival for her role in The Princess.

In 2006, she returned to the stage after a long absence, with a role in the musical Sweet Charity.

Molvig has been married twice, first to the Norwegian composer Alfred Janson and later to the Swedish count Carl Adam Lewenhaupt ("Noppe"). With Janson, she had a son, Teodor Janson, also an actor.

== Select filmography ==
- Sønner av Norge (1961)
- Operasjon Løvsprett (1962)
- Sailors (1964)
- Stompa forelsker seg (1965)
- The Princess (1966)
- Spader, Madame! (1969)
- The Man Who Quit Smoking (1972)
- SOPOR (1981)
- Folk og røvere i Kardemomme by (1988)
- Gåsmamman (2015 - 2024)
