= The Adventures of Picasso =

1978 film

- Film poster
- Directed by: Tage Danielsson
- Written by: Tage Danielsson, Hans Alfredson (with a few ideas from Gösta Ekman)
- Produced by: Staffan Hedqvist
- Starring: Gösta Ekman; Hans Alfredson; Margaretha Krook
- Narrated by: Tovio Pawlo (Swedish version); Bernard Cribbins (English version); Ove Sprogøe (Danish version); Per Aabel (Norwegian version); Raymond Bussières (French version).
- Cinematography: Tony Forsberg, Roland Sterner
- Edited by: Jan Persson
- Music by: Gunnar Svensson, Erik Satie, Jan Allan
- Distributed by: Svensk Filmindustri (SF)
- Release date: 20 May 1978
- Running time: 115 minutes
- Country: Sweden
- Language: Swedish

The Adventures of Picasso (Swedish: Picassos äventyr) is a 1978 Swedish surrealist comedy film directed by Tage Danielsson, starring Gösta Ekman, as the famous painter. The film had the tag-line Tusen kärleksfulla lögner av Hans Alfredson och Tage Danielsson (A thousand loving lies by Hans Alfredson and Tage Danielsson). At the 14th Guldbagge Awards it won the award for Best Film.

The film uses ten languages: Spanish, French, Swedish, German, Finnish, Italian, English, Russian, Norwegian and Latin. Most of these words are very simple (agua, water), sometimes meaning something different from what they seem (Don Jose's military rank, Hauptbahnhof, which means "central rail station" in German) and other times just being complete nonsense.

== Plot ==
The film is very loosely based on Pablo Picasso's life, narrated by Toivo Pawlo, who introduces himself as Elsa Beskow. It opens with a quote by Picasso himself: "Art is a lie that leads us closer to the truth."

The story starts with Picasso's birth in Málaga, Spain. His father, Don Jose (Hans Alfredson), is an artist and discovers early his son's talent when the young boy makes a sculpture of Don Jose with his food. When Pablo is old enough (and now portrayed by Gösta Ekman) his father takes him to Madrid, so that Pablo can study art. On their way, they encounter two robbers who try to hurt a beautiful girl named Dolores (Lena Olin). After a slapstick number in which Picasso defeats the two attackers, she gives him a bottle of paint, containing a djinn. With the paint from that bottle he signs all his paintings. At the academy of art Pablo's talent is praised and awarded. When he returns home with a portrait of his mother Dona Maria (Margaretha Krook), he is equally praised there. Unfortunately, their happiness is ruined when Don Jose suddenly dies - or so it seems. At the funeral it turns out he's actually still alive. Despite this, Dona Maria keeps ignoring him with the words: "Idioto, tú es muerta" (= approximately, "You are dead, fool").

Pablo leaves for Paris, but has a hard time selling any of his paintings. One day his father comes to visit him, bringing the sad news that Dona Maria is dead. When Don Jose starts to eat an apple that Pablo used as a reference for his painting, Picasso starts to draw faster, still using the apple as reference. The result is the birth of cubism. This new style, however, is very hard to sell - until Pablo's father gets an idea from a fishing rod. He lowers the painting down from a window during a vernissage. The overall reaction is negative, with comments like "Scandal", "Merde", "Oh, mon dieu" and "piss". One of the guests however, finds the picture both charming and marvelous and declares that she wants to buy it. This lady is none other than the great writer Gertrude Stein (Bernard Cribbins), who is attending the vernissage with her companion Alice B. Toklas (Wilfrid Brambell).

After this, Picasso becomes the center of the art world of Paris. Along with names like Braque, Matisse, Fernand Léger, Pompidou, Entrecôte, Carl Larsson, Karl-Alfred, Loulou, Dodo, Jou-Jou, Clo-Clo, Margot, Frou Frou, Jenny Nyström, Hejsan-Tjosan, Corselet, Omelette and Rembrandt (most of these names are just nonsense and mean other things than you might suspect). The Paris artworld also included Hemingway, who enjoys knitting, Erik Satie, Guillaume Apollinaire, Henri Rousseau, Vincent van Gogh and no less than two Toulouse-Lautrec. Along with Mimi, a waitress who gave Puccini the inspiration to "Thy tiny hand is frozen", the reason for this being that she is carrying a wine cooler.

After this introduction to the artworld of Paris, the narrator tells about a "normal" day in Picasso's life. It ends with a visit from Mr. and Mrs. Guggenheim from New York City. Although the Swedish American multimillionaire Ingrid Svensson-Guggenheim (Birgitta Andersson) doesn't understand Picasso's art, she knows that it is expensive, and therefore immortal. She becomes a pest and at whatever the cost she is determined to become a part of Picasso's art and world. When Picasso no longer seems to be able to escape the annoying American, his two friends Rousseau (Lennart Nyman) and Apollinaire (Per Oscarsson) invite him to Rousseau's hidden forest, where Apollinaire reads aloud some of his poems for his friends. This gives Picasso an idea. They will have a masquerade in Rousseau's honor. This masquerade has a lot of famous historic persons, most of them dressed as furniture. It all ends with Rousseau, while playing his violin, flying out the window and into the night of Paris.

Now it's 1914 and Picasso and all of humanity is looking forward to a bright future full of liberty, equality and fraternity. This is all destroyed however with the coming of World War I and the headlines "KRASH! BOM! BANG!" In 1918, when the war is over, Pablo once again meets his father, who has invented a new shampoo that will regrow hair. It has another effect on Pablo however, who loses all of his hair and gives him his famous bald look. Shortly after this, Pablo gets the job to make the sets and clothes for the Russian ballet. The ballet, premiering in London, is not a success however. Don Jose makes the dancers' food and all the performers end up passing gas. Picasso returns to Paris, where he meets Sirkka (Lena Nyman), a Finnish singer who sings a song that he becomes enchanted by. However, when it turns out that that song (which is essentially a recipe for making a kalakukko) is the only one Sirkka has got in her repertoire, Picasso soon gets sick of it and leaves for New York City with his father.

In America there is a prohibition on art (a reference to the real Prohibition era of liquor). Pablo works underground and one day he is asked to deliver a set of pictures to a Mrs. X. It turns out that this mysterious woman is none other than Ingrid Svensson-Guggenheim. She doesn't give up so easily, but Picasso manages to escape her flirting. When delivering art to the local gangster Big Mac Kahnweiler, Pablo, Don Jose and Ingrid Svensson-Guggenheim are caught in a shootout between Big Mac and his rival Mr. Peperoni. The shootout is interrupted however by a police raid. A very foulmouthed cop accuses Pablo of being a murderer and states that art is a lethal poison. It all turns into an impromptu trial against Pablo with Ingrid Svensson-Guggenheim and the two gangs as the jury. Don Jose, acting as Pablo's lawyer tries to defend his son, stating that Picasso's work is not art, but childish graffiti. However, Pablo is still found guilty and is sentenced to death by the electric chair. The chair refuses to work however, and the electrician, a Norwegian named Grieg (Rolv Wesenlund), is sent in to fix it. It all backfires however and in the mess Pablo draws a door on the wall and escapes back to Europe.

In Europe however, "the monsters" -- Benito Mussolini, Adolf Hitler and Francisco Franco—have seized power. Don Jose joins the German army and later on becomes promoted to the rank of Hauptbahnhof (a German word meaning main train station) in the SS, in charge of Operation Ostrich, with the mission to find opposition men in hiding. During the war, Picasso uses his apartment to hide opposition members. When the war is over, Don Jose quickly changes into French clothes, stating "I like Ike!", waving the American flag and singing My Old Kentucky Home, charming the Americans in pretty much the same way he did with the Germans. After World War II Pablo settles down at the Riviera, where he once again meets the love of his youth, Dolores, and her granddaughter (who, like young Dolores, is played by Lena Olin). Inspired by them Picasso sends his doves (animated birds) out in a world plagued by the Cold War.

After a while, Don Jose shows up again with his new wife, who turns out to be Ingrid Svensson-Guggenheim. Picasso is trapped by his own fame, he has become an industry and his house is converted into a museum while he still lives in it. After drinking the last of the ink in the magic bottle Dolores gave him years ago, he falls asleep and dies. At the same moment all the signatures on Picasso's paintings disappear, it becomes The Great Picasso crash. But, as we find out, Picasso is not really dead. When everyone has left the room he gets up, waves goodbye to his paintings and fades into the wall.

== Cast ==
- Gösta Ekman as Pablo Picasso
- Hans Alfredson as Don José
- Margaretha Krook as Doña María
- Lena Olin as Dolores
- Bernard Cribbins as Gertrude Stein / Narrator
- Wilfrid Brambell as Alice B. Toklas
- Lennart Nyman as Henri Rousseau
- Per Oscarsson as Guillaume Apollinaire
- Elisabeth Söderström as Mimi
- Birgitta Andersson as Ingrid Svensson-Guggenheim
- Magnus Härenstam as Hitler
- Sune Mangs as Churchill
- Yngve Gamlin as Diaghilev
- Lisbeth Zachrisson as Olga
- Lena Nyman as Sirkka
- Tom Younger as Superintendent
- Rolv Wesenlund as Grieg
- Sven Lindberg as Dr. Albert Schweitzer

== Production ==
Gösta Ekman originally thought it would be funny to write a book about a place that you never visited. In the same manner it would be funny to do a biography about a person you never met. Like Mozart, Jesus or Picasso.

Despite the fact that this movie is set in Spain, London, Paris, the French Riviera and America most of the movie was shot in and around the Swedish town of Tomelilla. Many of the scenes are filmed at the same street. Using a glasspainting in front of the camera and changing a few things on the set, the filmmakers could turn the little street of Tomelilla into all the big cities shown in this film.

All of Picasso's paintings for this movie were made by Per Åhlin. After the film's premiere the paintings by Per Åhlin were shown at a vernissage in Tomelilla with pricetags from 222 220 kronor and up. All except one, Elsa Melon, that only cost 40 kr, but it was listed as already sold. Per Åhlin wanted the paintings to be destroyed after the vernissage so they wouldn't be spread as Per Åhlin-paintings when they were only "Per Åhlin-paintings that mimicked Picasso for a movie full of lies". According to the movie's commentary track by Gösta Ekman, some of the paintings were saved by the cast and crew who now keep them in their houses.

Sirkka's song is actually a recipe for pastry of fish and bacon.

== Release ==
The narration of this movie is the only thing that is dubbed into other languages, because of the multilingual dialogue. In all versions it is a man who introduces himself as a famous female. In Sweden the narrator introduces himself as "Elsa Beskow", in English it is Gertrude Stein, in Danish, Karen Blixen, in Norwegian, Margrethe Munthe and the French narrator introduces himself as Mistinguett.

Years after the movie's release, when Gösta Ekman went to Budapest on vacation, he found that people looked at him in a very odd way. He eventually understood why when a local asked him if he were Picasso, to which Gösta replied, "If you mean that I played Picasso in a movie then, yeah, that's right." He later found out that the film was a great success in Hungary, where it has been playing in a Budapest cinema every year since its release, and even had been turned into a stage play. Hans Alfredson, who wrote the script along with Tage Danielsson and also starred as Pablo's father, has seen the play and liked it. He commented that "It was very faithful to the film."
