= Gröna hund =

Gröna hund, complete title Gröna Hund på Gröna Lund (Green Dog on Gröna Lund, also a reference to "Röda hund", literally "Red dog", but also Swedish for "rubella"), was the first variety show produced by AB Svenska Ord. After that the writers/actors Hans Alfredsson and Tage Danielsson became known as Hasseåtage. The show premièred on 27 April 1962 on Gröna Lund in Stockholm. It also made a few performances in Gothenburg, Malmö, and Oslo.

== Personnel ==
The show was written by both Hasse and Tage and directed by Tage. It was the first of the three "Dog-revues", the second being Gula Hund and the third one Svea hund. Other members of the cast included Monica Zetterlund, Lissi Alandh, Emil "Mille" Schmidt, Lasse O'Månsson, Muriel Ari and Gunnar Svensson's trio. Tage Danielsson at first only wanted to direct, since he doubted his skills on stage, but the other cast members managed to persuade him. He sang a satirical song about the MRA that was well liked. The show was also the debut for the character Lindeman. An act where Hasse was to be interviewed about something in the newspapers as his character Valfrid Lindeman. This act was improvised and therefore different from time to time.

== Notable numbers ==
The most famous number is probably Hasse Alfredssons "Ringaren" (The Bellringer), where he plays a bell-ringer who holds a monologue about the Church of Sweden and especially his own parish, which is very small, and their local Pastor Jansson. A very modern and young priest, who may not know The Ten Commandments but he has seen the movie, at least. The bell-ringer later returned in the variety show Glaset i örat, where he made a phone call to Jansson, who now worked for a newspaper, wondering if he could write a little something about a (very unorthodox) play that the local parish had made about Jesus.

== Production ==
The show was filmed for TV and has since been released on DVD.
