= Gunnar Svensson =

Swedish ice hockey player (1956–2020)

- Born: 27 June 1956
- Died: 31 January 2020 (aged 63)
- Position: Forward
- Played for: Örnsköldsviks SK; IF Björklöven
- Playing career: 1972–1978

Gunnar Svensson (27 June 1956 – 31 January 2020) was a Swedish ice hockey player, head coach and sports agent.

During his playing career Svensson played for Örnsköldsvik and IF Björklöven. He began his coaching career in Örnsköldsvik before signing on to IK Vita Hästen. Svensson coached his first and only Elitserien club when he signed on a five-year contract with Djurgårdens IF in 1984. Svensson's first season in Djurgården went well, the team won the league and beat Färjestads BK in the semifinals. However, Södertälje SK proved to be too hard in the final and became Swedish champions. The following season was quite the opposite; Djurgården was close to being relegated, and Svensson was subsequently fired on 26 January 1986. After his stay in Djurgården, he became coach for IF Troja/Ljungby until 1988. This marked the end of Svensson's coaching career and he went on to be a manager in Vita Hästen. He left his post in Vita Hästen for the same post in Malmö Redhawks in 1995. After internal conflicts in the club Svensson left his position as manager in 1996 and started to work as a sports agent for players like Henrik Zetterberg, Andreas Pihl and Fredrik Emvall.

Svensson was the father of the NHL's Ottawa Senators winger Magnus Pääjärvi-Svensson.
