= Tage Danielsson =

Swedish author, actor, comedian, poet and film director (1928–1985)

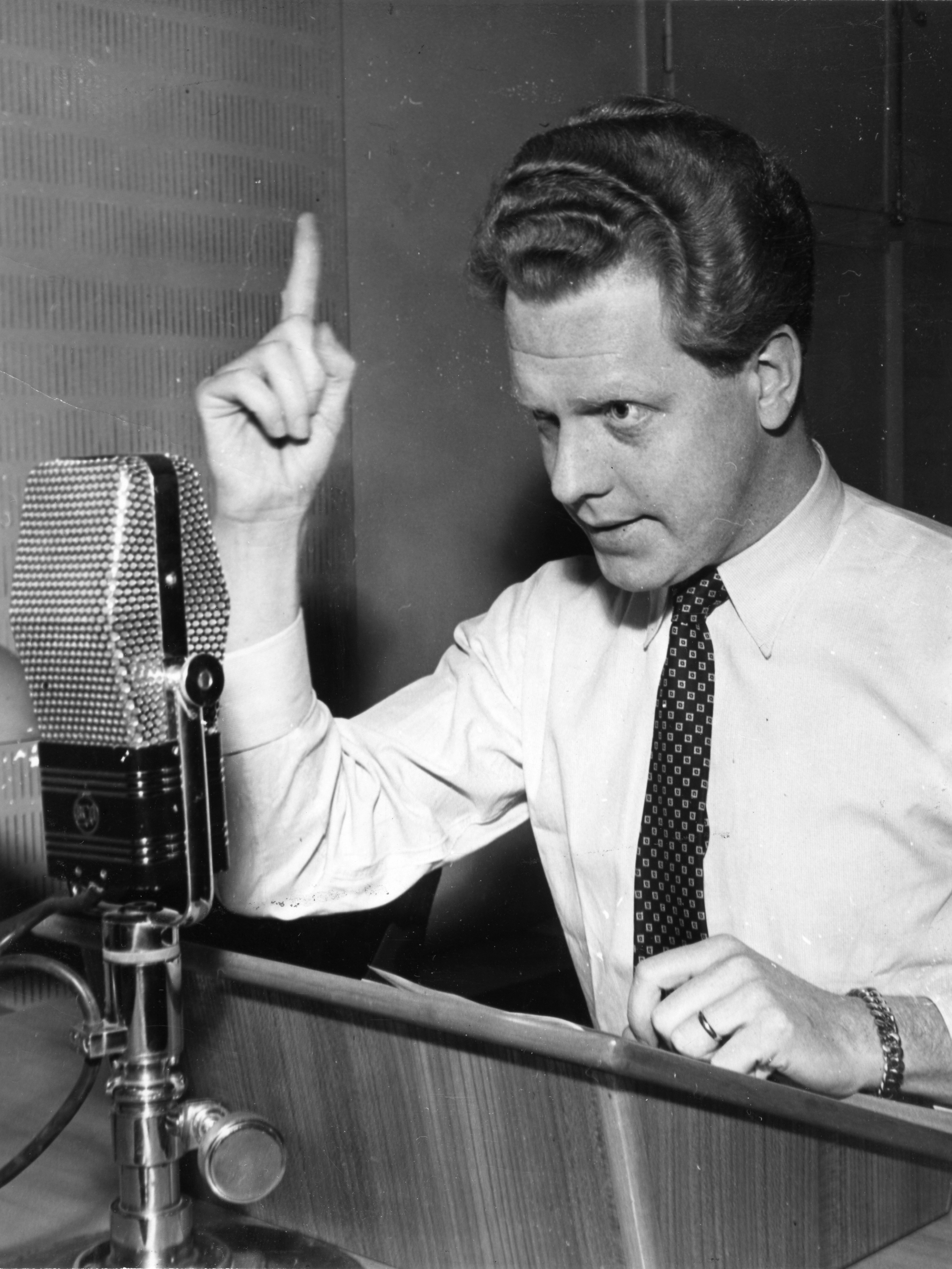
- Tage Danielsson in his radio series Till Andersson i Nedan which was broadcast in Sveriges Radio 1954–55.
- Born: Tage Ivar Roland Danielsson; 5 February 1928; Linköping, Sweden
- Died: 13 October 1985 (aged 57); Stockholm, Sweden
- Education: Katedralskolan
- Alma mater: Uppsala University
- Occupations: Author, actor, comedian, poet, director
- Spouse: Märta-Stina Köhler (m. 1955)
- Children: 2
- Awards: Guldbaggen Best film 1971 Äppelkriget (director, script); 1975 Släpp fångarne loss – det är vår! (director, script); 1978 The Adventures of Picasso (director, script)

Tage Ivar Roland Danielsson (Swedish pronunciation: [ˈtɑ̌ːɡɛ ˈdɑ̂ːnɪɛlˌsɔn]; 5 February 1928 – 13 October 1985) was a Swedish author, actor, comedian, poet and film director. He worked together with Hans Alfredson in the comedy duo Hasse & Tage.

== Early life ==
Danielsson was born on 5 February 1928 in Linköping, Sweden, the son of Ivar Danielsson, a bus driver, and his wife Elsa (née Svensson). He passed studentexamen at Katedralskolan in Linköping in 1948 and received a Master of Philosophy degree from Uppsala University in 1954. There he got involved in student theatre of Östgöta Nation and became a member of the Juvenalorden, as well as serving as vice president of the Uppsala Student Union.

== Career ==
After graduation, Danielsson found work at Sveriges Radio in 1955. He became head of the entertainment department's speech section in 1956, production manager of the entertainment department in 1958, and department head from 1959 to 1962. At his work he came in contact with Hans Alfredson. They started the entertainment production company AB Svenska Ord (Swedish Words Ltd) together in 1961. Danielsson and Alfredson wrote, directed and acted in multiple revues and films over the coming decades.

In 1972 at the 8th Guldbagge Awards he won the Best Director award for the film The Apple War (1971). At the 12th Guldbagge Awards his film Release the Prisoners to Spring (1975) won the award for Best Film. At the 14th Guldbagge Awards his film The Adventures of Picasso (1978) won the award for Best Film. In 1985 his film Ronia, the Robber's Daughter (1984), based on Astrid Lindgren's book Ronja, the Robber's Daughter (1981), was entered into the 35th Berlin International Film Festival.

Svenska Ord in general, and Danielsson in particular, excelled in making scorching comments on current events in an illusorily naive and outward-lookingly friendly way that often succeeded to endear even political opponents to his particular brand of humorist humanism. He was also a constant campaigner behind the scene for causes ranging from anti-apartheid to anti-nuclear to social solidarity, he was also a regular contributor to the anarcho-syndicalist newspaper Arbetaren.

In 1980 he received an honorary doctorate at Linköping University.

== Personal life ==
In 1955, Danielsson married Märta-Stina Köhler (born 1930), the daughter of Knut Köhler and Karin Janze. They had two sons: Patrik (born 1961) and Jesper (born 1963).

In January 1983, Danielsson's summer house in Corsica was bombed. Danielsson, who had owned the house in Corsica for the past 20-25 years, left for Sweden a week before the bombing. The attack, which completely destroyed the house, was carried out by the National Liberation Front of Corsica (FLNC) as part of the Corsican conflict. The organization's goal is to free Corsica from France.

== Death ==
Danielsson died on 13 October 1985 from skin cancer (melanoma), which he had been fighting for several years. A statue of him can be seen just outside the grounds of his old secondary school in Linköping.

== Selected filmography ==
=== Film ===
- Swedish Portraits (Svenska bilder) (1964) – Cousin Nr 1
- Docking the Boat (Att angöra en brygga) (1965) – Olsson
- Stimulantia (1967) – (Segment)
- Skrållan, Ruskprick och Knorrhane (1967) – Knorrhane
- Lådan (1968)
- Out of an Old Man's Head (I huvet på en gammal gubbe) (1968) – Bilförare (uncredited)
- The Apple War (Äppelkriget) (1971) – Bernhard Lindberg
- The Man Who Quit Smoking (Mannen som slutade röka) (1972)
- Egg! Egg! A Hardboiled Story (1975) – Head Waiter
- Release the Prisoners to Spring (Släpp fångarne loss, det är vår!) (1975) – Hennes vän
- The Adventures of Picasso (Picassos äventyr) (1978)
- SOPOR (1981)
- P & B (1983) – Drunkard
- Ronia, the Robber's Daughter (Ronja Rövardotter) (1984)
- False as Water (1985) – Party Guest (uncredited) (final film role)

=== Television ===
- Gröna hund (1962, TV Movie)
- Gula hund (1966, TV Movie)
- Spader, Madame! (1969, TV Movie) – Gabriel von Löwensköld
- Glaset i örat (1974, TV Movie)
- Svea hund på Göta Lejon (1976, TV Movie)
