= Docking the Boat =

- Swedish poster
- Directed by: Tage Danielsson
- Written by: Hans Alfredson; Tage Danielsson
- Produced by: Lars-Owe Carlberg
- Starring: Monica Zetterlund; Lars Ekborg; Birgitta Andersson; Gösta Ekman
- Cinematography: Martin Bodin
- Edited by: Carl-Olov Skeppstedt
- Music by: Lars Färnlöf; Charles Redland
- Release date: 26 December 1965
- Running time: 102 minutes
- Country: Sweden
- Language: Swedish

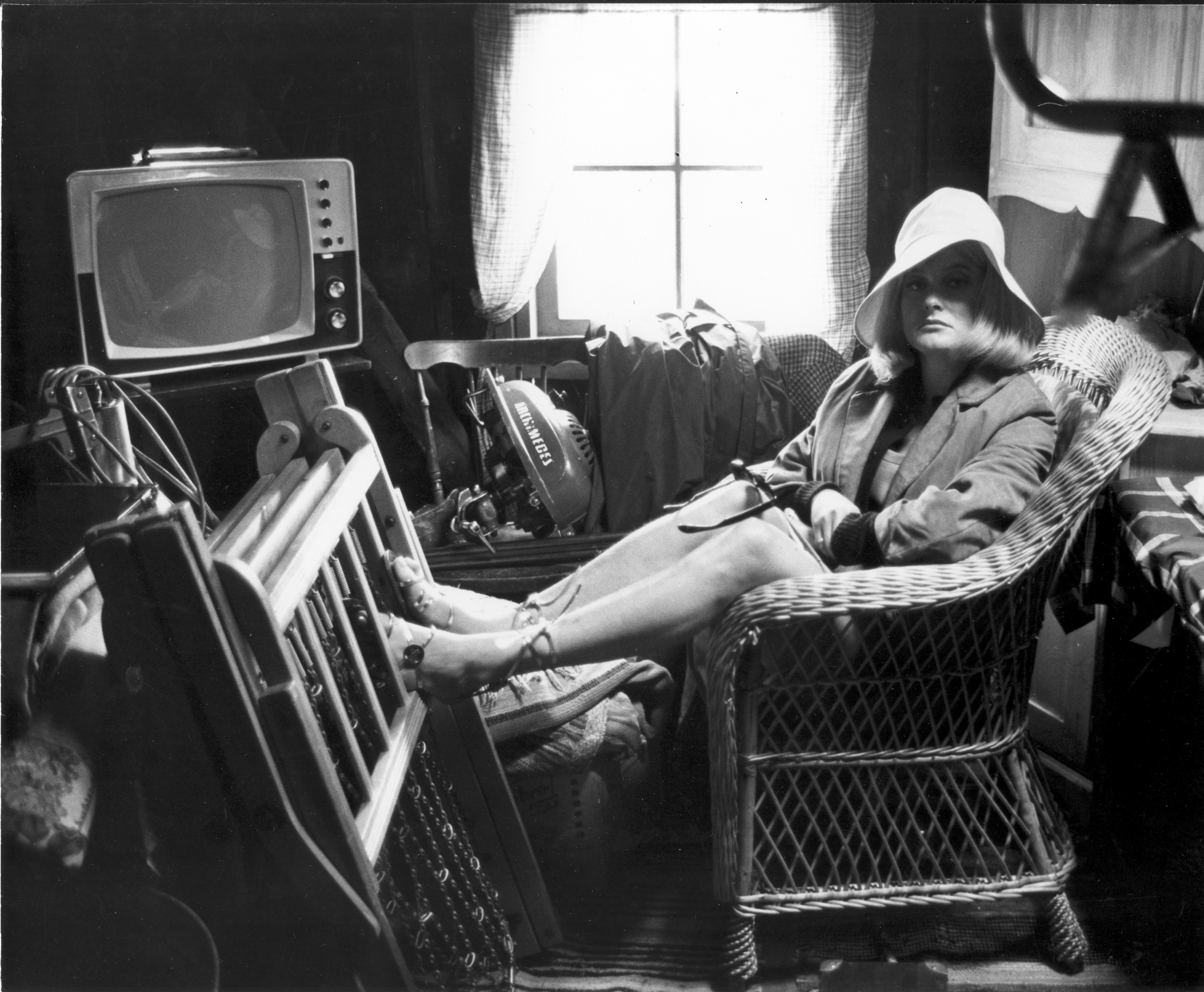
Monica Zetterlund taking a break during filming.

Docking the Boat (Swedish: Att angöra en brygga, or sometimes: To Go Ashore) is a Swedish dark comedy film from 1965 directed by Tage Danielsson. The film stars Gösta Ekman, Monica Zetterlund, Hans Alfredson, Lars Ekborg and Birgitta Andersson. Monica Zetterlund also performed the theme song.

== Plot ==
A group of friends are to celebrate the summer on a small island in the Stockholm Archipelago. The plan is to eat crayfish and drink snaps, a quintessentially Swedish tradition.

Some are already in the house on the island (with the food) and the rest of the group arrives by boat (bringing the snaps), but they experience great difficulties while trying to come ashore. Their only neighbor on the island, an eccentric, Hollywood-obsessed, hot-tempered hermit doesn't make the situation better.

== Cast ==
- Monica Zetterlund as Berit
- Lars Ekborg as Kalle
- Birgitta Andersson as Mona
- Gösta Ekman as Lennart
- Katie Rolfsen as Inez
- Hans Alfredson as Garbo
- Hatte Furuhagen as Walter
- Tage Danielsson as Olsson
- Jim Hughes as Man finding message in bottle
