= Jan Olsson (film scholar) =

Swedish film scholar (born 1952)

Jan Olsson (born 1952 in Helsingborg) is a Swedish film scholar, professor of cinema studies and former head of department at Stockholm University. He has been a visiting professor at the University of Southern California, UCLA, Northwestern University, Utrecht University and the City University of Hong Kong. Olsson is the founding editor of John Libbey's book series Stockholm Studies in Cinema, and the founding editor of the scholarly journal Aura Film Studies Journal. Along his trajectory of archival research, he has found copies of two previously lost early films, Buster Keaton's The Cook and Fatty Arbuckle's A Reckless Romeo. He currently leads the research project “From Business Commodities to Revered Cultural Heritage: Global Media, Vernacular Strategies, and Cultural Negotiations,” funded by a grant from Vetenskapsrådet (the Swedish Research Council). He is also responsible editor of Acta Universitatis Stockholmiensis' cinema studies series—distributed by Stockholm University library.

Professor Olsson has published widely on various aspects of film and media studies, including the changes brought by the DVD. He has argued for the formation of a new media archive in Sweden. His primary research interests are historical reception and emerging media in cross-cultural perspectives, including early American and Swedish cinema and media. In addition to numerous articles, many for the journal Film History, his books include Svensk spelfilm under andra världskriget (1979), Från filmljud till ljudfilm (1986), Sensationer från en bakgård (1988), Nordic Explorations (co-edited with John Fullerton, 1999), Allegories of Communication (co-edited with John Fullerton, 2004), Television after TV (co-edited with Lynn Spigel, 2004), Media, Popular Culture, and the American Century (co-edited with Kingsley Bolton, 2010), Los Angeles Before Hollywood: Journalism and American Film Culture, 1905 to 1915 (2008) and Hitchcock à la Carte (2015). He is the co-editor of Corporeality in Early Film: Viscera, Skin, and Physical Form (2018).

In a recent talk at the Unit of Criticism and Interpretive Theory, University of Illinois, he presented this project in which he argued that like the culinary practices and standards set in his personal kitchen, Hitchcock's cinema required the same kind of preparation and the perfect blend of ingredients. Through this combination of food art and cinema, Hitchcock created his iconic, international persona using a bizarre and untraditional connection with his sense of taste and love of the kitchen. Hitchcock's underrepresented television career-of particular interest to Olsson-played a crucial part in developing Hitchcock's public persona. It was television, he argued, that truly shaped Hitchcock into a global figure.

Together with Richard Abel, they have extensively promoted the use of newspapers in the research of early cinema, raising awareness about the benefits of digitizing the material for researchers to access worldwide. He argued that Audiovisual Archives has to open up to the Academic Research, educational purposes and public access. He proposed another framework for understanding film cultural change, according to which this process is driven by the rational negotiating of film culture's overall cultural position. This framework is inspired by cultural studies in general and Raymond Williams in particular, suggesting that early film culture can be culturally mapped—internally and in relation to the overall culture—by using Williams's categories of the “emergent,” the “residual,” and the “dominant.”

Jan Olsson took an active part by giving the keynote speech in the FIAT/IFTA local seminar in Santiago de Chile, Chile in 1998, lecturing about the importance of preservation of movies and the academic studies of the movies. He stressed how access to audiovisual archives is necessary to enable students to study the old films. In his continuous strive to create awareness of the importance of archival material as cultural heritage, professor Olsson was responsible for the 2001 series of film historical documentaries I tuppens tecken [In the name of the Rooster] - based on a world unique collection of very early Pathé fiction films hold in the SVT archives.

[..]Of course we haven´t ever been unaware of the quality of our historical collections. It has been of great importance for the programme production in general, since we acquired the footage in the late sixties. But a few years ago, Professor Jan Olsson of the Stockholm University Department of Cinema Studies contacted me on a special matter. He was anxious to get the permission to show a number of our very early Pathé fiction films - as celluloid films - at a seminar for his colleagues from all over the world at the Swedish National Archive. It was Professor Olsson and his colleagues that made us aware of that a great number of our Pathé films were absolutely world unique, either as the only remaining copies or as copies more complete and in better condition than anywhere else known in the film literature. Here started the development of a close cooperation between the SVT and the University in fund raising for making the pre-broadcast material and catalogue more accessible to the academic public and of course in the end - the programme production. I believe in the dialectics of everyday life. Through letting the scholars into the archives, besides it resulting in a mutual exchange of information about the material, it also created new ideas for programming based on the material. (Lasse Nilsson, SVT)

== Awards and nominations ==
(2006) Allegories of Communication: Intermedia Concerns from Cinema to the Digital - nominated as book of the month by the Resource Centre of Cyberculture Studies at University of San Francisco.
(2002) Finalist and special commendation for the Kraszna- Krausz Moving Image Book Award. Awarded for Nordic Explorations: Film Before 1930
(1998) Belle Van Zuylen Honorary Professor at University of Utrecht
(1998) Robin Hood Medal for outstanding research in film history. Awarded for From Film Sound to Sound film

== Bibliography ==
- Svensk spelfilm under andra världskriget. Stockholm: LiberLäromedel, 1979. ISBN 9789140302656. (in Swedish)
- Från filmljud till ljudfilm: samtida experiment med odödlig teater, sjungande bilder och Edisons kinetophon 1903–1914. Stockholm: Proprius, 1986. ISBN 9789171185389. (in Swedish)
- Sensationer från en bakgård: Frans Lundberg som biografägare och filmproducent i Malmö och Köpenhamn. Stockholm: Symposion, 1988. ISBN 9789178680931.
- Nordic Explorations: Film Before 1930, co-edited with John Fullerton. Stockholm Studies in Cinema. London: John Libbey, 1999. ISBN 9781864620559.
- Allegories of Communication: Intermedial Concerns from Cinema to the Digital, co-edited with John Fullerton. London: John Libbey, 2004. ISBN 9780861966516.
- Television after TV: Essays on a Medium in Transition, co-edited with Lynn Spigel. Console-ing passions. Durham: Duke UP, 2004. ISBN 9780822333838.
- Los Angeles Before Hollywood: Journalism and American Film Culture 1905–1915. Mediehistoriskt arkiv 10. Stockholm: National Library of Sweden, 2008. ISBN 9789188468062.
- Hitchcock à la carte, Duham: Duke University Press, 2015. ISBN 978-0822358046

== Articles and chapter in edited volumes ==
- "Pressing Matters: Media Crusades before the Nickelodeons." In: Film History. An International Journal, ISSN 0892-2160, E-ISSN 1553-3905, Vol. 27, no 2, 105–139.
- "Filmaffärer: sicksackande anteckningar kring några Frank Heller-adaptioner." In: Frank Heller och filmen / [ed] Göran Wessberg, Lund: Pelotard Press, 2014, 41–58.
- "Stiller at first: A footnote." In: Journal of Scandinavian Cinema, ISSN 2042-7891, Vol. 4, no 1, 5–13.
- "National Soul/Cosmopolitan Skin: Swedish Cinema at a Crossroads." In: Silent Cinema and the Politics of Space / [ed] Jennifer Bean et al., Bloomington: Indiana UP: Indiana University Press, 2014, 245–269.
- "World War II and Scandinavian cinema: An overview." In: Journal of Scandinavian Cinema, Vol. 2, no 3, 201–212.
- "Screen Bodies and Busybodies: Corporeal Constellations in the Era of Anonymity." In: Film History. An International Journal, ISSN 0892-2160, E-ISSN 1553-3905, Vol. 25, no 1–2, 188–204.
- "‘Asta’s ink: The Stockholm letters." In: Journal of Scandinavian Cinema, ISSN 2042-7891, Vol. 2, no 1, 5–11.
- "Modernity Stops at Nothing: The American Chase Film and the Specter of Lynching." In: A Companion to Early Cinema / [ed] André Gaudreault, Nicolas Dulac, Santiago Hidalgo, Malden, Mass.: Wiley-Blackwell, 2012, 257–276.
- "Mediated America: Americana as Hollywoodiana." In: Media, popular culture, and the American century / [ed] Kingsley Bolton and Jan Olsson, London: John Libbey, 2010, 7-33.
- "Klostret i Sendomir." In: Le Giornate del Cinema Muro, 2011 / [ed] La Cineteca del Friuli, Pordenone: Le Giornate del Cinema Muto, 2011, 131–133.
- "Alfred Hitchcock, théoricien de la télévision." In: Télévision: le moment expérimental / [ed] Gilles Delavaud & Denis Maréchal, Rennes: Éditions Apogée, 2011, 536–548.
- ""Italian Marionettes Meet Cinematic Modernity." In: Media, Popular Culture, and the American Century / [ed] Kingsley Bolton och Jan Olsson, Stockholm/London: Kungliga biblioteket/John Libbey Publishing, 2010, 35–61.
- "Rediscoveries and Restorations: Karusellen." In: Le Giornate del Cinema Muto XXIX edizione, 29th Pordenone Silent Film festival, Pordenone: Associazone Culturale "Le Giornate del Cinema Muto", 2010, 98-100
- "Nils Krok’s Social Pathos and Paul Garbagni’s Style: Ingeborg Holm as Objekt Lesson." In: Film History. An International Journal, ISSN 0892-2160, E-ISSN 1553-3905, Vol. 22, no 1, 73–94.
- "Negotiating Peripheral Feature Market:Malmo–Copenhagen–Berlin/Kristianstad–Stockholm–Paris." In: Domitor 2008: Les Cinémas périphériques dans la période des premier temps/Peripheral Early Cinema / [ed] François Amy de la Bretèque, Michel Cadé, Jordi Pons i Busquet, Angel Quintana, Perpignan: Presses Universitaires de Perpignan, 2010, 1, 131–142.
- "The Canon Revisited: Gunnar Hedes saga." In: Le Giornate del Cinema Muto XXVIII edizione/28th Pordenone Silent Film festival, Pordenone: Associazone Culturale "Le Giornate del Cinema Muto", 2009, 98–100.
- "Filmvisning på utrygg grunn – tilfellet Arthur S. Hyman." In: Veier Tilbake. Filmhistoriske perspektiver, Høyskoleforlaget, Kristiansand, 2009, 182–201.
- "Lek." In: Film och andra rörliga bilder - en introduktion, Raster Förlag, Stockholm, 2008, 88–104.
- “ ‘Dear Miss Gagner!’ – A Star and Her Methods,” In: Stellar Encounters: Stardom in Popular European Cinema, John Libbey Publishing, London, 2008, 217-229.
- “Terror à la Fox: Tid, rum och teknologi.” In: Mediernas kulturhistoria, SLBA, Stockholm, 2008, 223–245.
- “Microbes, Animals, and Humans: THE ESCAPE and the Politics of Undesirable Breeding.” In: The D.W. Griffith Project Volume 12, British Film Institute, London/Palgrave Macmillan, 2008, 69–82.
- “Calling the Shots: Communications, Transportation and Motion Picture Technologies.” In: Le cinématographe, nouvelle technologie du 20e siècle / The Cinema, A New Technology for the 20th Century, Lausanne: Editions Payot, 2004, 273–281.
- ”Pressing Inroads: Metaspectators and the Nickelodeon Culture.” In: Screen Culture: History and Textuality, Eastleigh: John Libbey Publishing, 2004, 113–135.
- “Trading Places: Griffith, Patten and Agricultural Modernity.” In: Film History, Vol. 17, no 1, 39–65.
- “A Remarkably Versatile Dane”: Authorship, Style, and Trickality in Benjamin Christensen's Blind Justice." In: North-West Passage, Vol. 3, no -, 9-24.
- "Framing Silent Calls: Coming to Cinematographic Terms with Telephony." In: Allegories of Communication. Intermedial Concerns from Cinema to the Digital, Rome: John Libbey, 2004, 157–192.
- “Postmodern High Noon: 24 and the Shifting Landscape of Television.” In: Shifting Landscapes: Media and Film in European Context, Newcastle: Cambridge Scholars Publishing, 2008, 262–286.
- ”Sound Aspirations: The Two Dimensions of Synchronicity.” In: Le son en perspective: nouvelles recherches/New Perspectives in Sound Study, Bruxelles, P.I. E,-Peter Lang, 2004, 2004, 99–114.
- “Quel film non esiste.” In: Per Dreyer: Incarnazione del Cinema, Milan: Il Castoro, 2004, 126–137.
- "Två Människor/Two People." In: The Cinema of Scandinavia, London: Wallflower Press, 2005, 79–88.
- "One Commercial Week." In: Television After TV: Essays on a Medium in Transition, Durham and London: Duke University Press, 2004, 249–269.
- "Hitchcock à la Carte: Menus, Marketing and the Macabre." In: Casting a Shadow: Creating the Alfred Hitchcock Film, Evanston: Northwestern University Press, 2007, 62–77; 81.
