= Gösta Ekman =

Swedish actor (1939–2017)

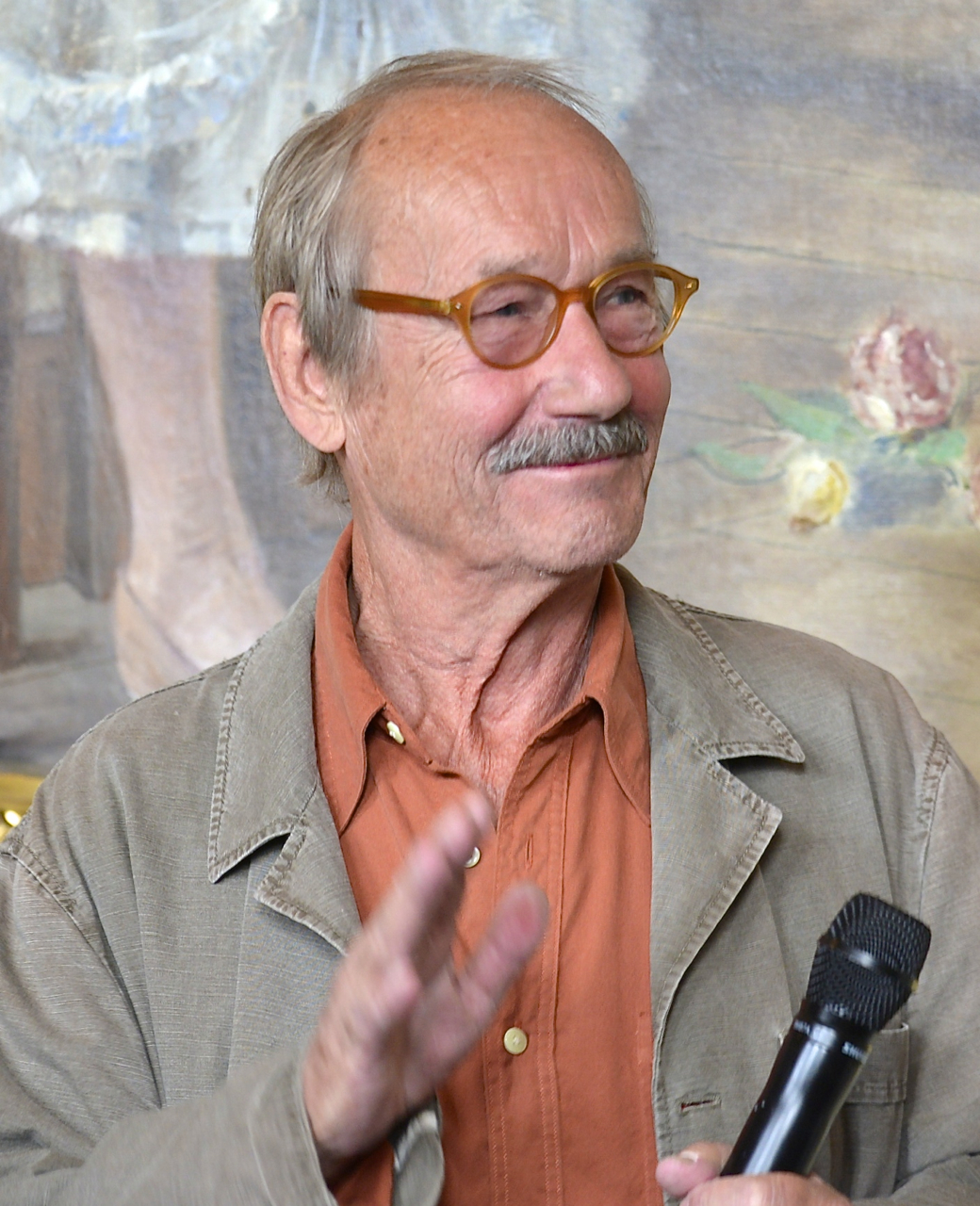
- Gösta Ekman in August 2014.
- Born: Hans Gösta Gustaf Ekman; 28 July 1939; Stockholm, Sweden
- Died: 1 April 2017 (aged 77); Stockholm, Sweden
- Occupations: Actor, comedian, director, writer
- Spouses: Fatima Svendsen (m. 1963; div. 1974) Pia Harahap (m. 1979; div. 1986) Marie-Louise Fuchs (m. 1989)
- Children: 3
- Relatives: Hasse Ekman (father); Gösta Ekman (grandfather)

Hans Gösta Gustaf Ekman (Swedish pronunciation: [ˈjœ̂sːta ˈěːkman]; 28 July 1939 – 1 April 2017) was a Swedish actor, comedian, and director.

== Career ==
Ekman was born in Stockholm, Sweden, to the Swedish actor and director Hasse Ekman and Agneta (née baroness Wrangel af Sauss). Ekman represented the third generation in a family of prominent Swedish actors. First in the line was his paternal grandfather, also named Gösta Ekman, followed by his father Hasse Ekman, a successful film director and actor. Ekman's theatrical family also included his brothers Stefan Ekman and Mikael Ekman, a stage director, and his niece, Sanna Ekman, an actress. He was married from 1989 to artist and film director Marie-Louise Ekman, previously Marie-Louise De Geer Bergenstråhle, née Fuchs. Ekman sometimes appeared in credits as Gösta Ekman Jr. to avoid being confused with his famous grandfather.

He was an assistant director to Per-Axel Branner, Hasse Ekman, Stig Olin, Bengt Ekerot and Ingmar Bergman from 1956 to 1961. Ekman started his acting career in the theaters, such as the Alléteatern from 1956 to 1957, Munkbroteatern in 1959 and the Stockholm City Theatre in 1960. He also appeared in several Swedish films, including the Jönssonligan series. He was most famous for his comedic works, especially his collaboration with the comic duo Hasse & Tage on stage and in films—where he often played the leading parts. His body of work, though, included a number of genres, including a series of dramatic police films, in which he played the famous fictional Swedish policeman Martin Beck.

While Ekman officially retired from stage and film work in 2003, he returned in 2005 to play leading parts in his wife's two films, Asta Nilssons sällskap and Pingvinresan. In 2007, he directed the play Gäckanden for the Swedish Royal Dramatic Theatre in Stockholm.

== Personal life ==
He was married from 1963 to 1974 to Karl Gerhard's adopted daughter Fatima Svendsen (born 1944), with whom he had a son, Måns Ekman (born 1964). Subsequently, he was married from 1979 to 1987 to Pia Harahap (born 1955), with whom he had two adopted children. In 1989 he married Marie-Louise Ekman (born 1944). They were married until Gösta Ekman's death.

He died on 1 April 2017, at the age of 77 from bile duct cancer.

== Awards and nominations ==
Ekman won the Swedish film award Guldbagge Award in 1993 for his role as policeman Martin Beck in the Guldbagge-winning film The Man on the Balcony, based on the 1967 novel by Maj Sjöwall and Per Wahlöö. Ekman also won the special Hedersguldbaggen (Honorable Guldbagge) award in 2008 for his service to the Swedish film and theater industry.

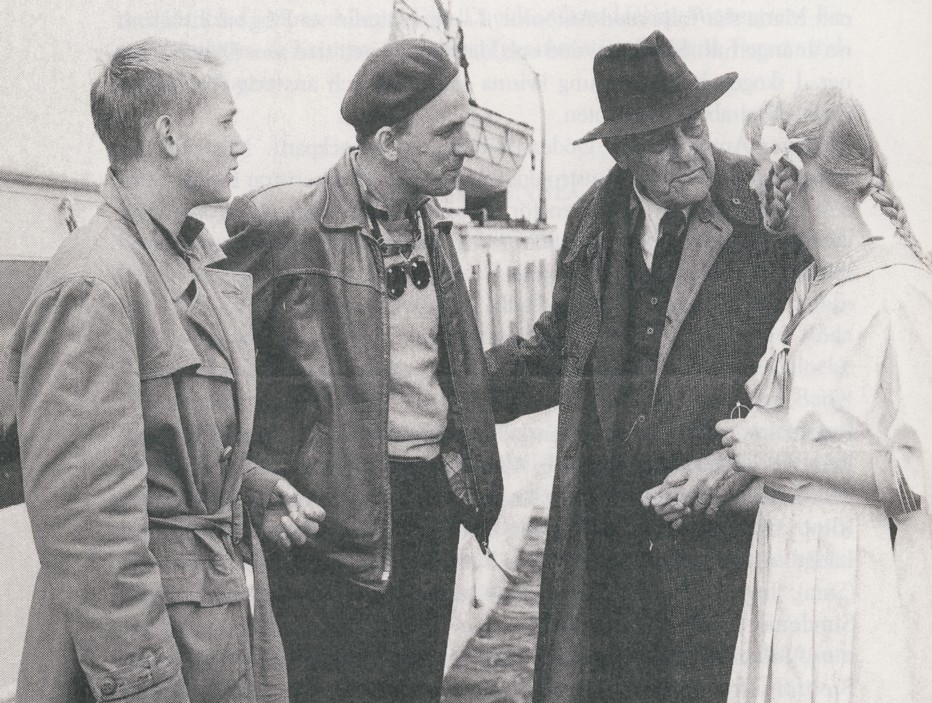
L–R: Gösta Ekman, Ingmar Bergman, Victor Sjöström, and Lena Bergman during the filming of Wild Strawberries (1957).

== Selected filmography ==
- 1956: Swing it, fröken - Erik
- 1962: Chans - Stefan
- 1962: Nils Holgerssons underbara resa - Student
- 1964: Svenska bilder (Hasse & Tage film) - Bengtsson
- 1964: Äktenskapsbrottaren - Herr Sixten
- 1965: Nattcafé (TV Movie) - Peter
- 1965: Festivitetssalongen - Blom - Journalist
- 1965: Docking the Boat (Hasse & Tagefilm) - Lennart
- 1965: Niklasons (TV series) - Martin (1965)
- 1966: Woman of Darkness - Per / Son-Hanna's husband
- 1968: Lådan
- 1968: Jag älskar, du älskar - Stan
- 1968: I huvet på en gammal gubbe (Out of an Old Man's Head) (Hasse & Tage film) - Student
- 1969: Som natt och dag - Rikard
- 1969: Duett för kannibaler - Tomas
- 1969: Spader, Madame! (TV Movie) - Johan Isak
- 1971: Niklas och figuren - Micke's Father
- 1971: The Apple War (Hasse & Tage film) - Sten Wall, PR-man
- 1972: The Man Who Quit Smoking (Hasse & Tage film) - Dante Alighieri
- 1972: Experimentlek
- 1973: Kvartetten som sprängdes (The Quartet That Broke Up) (TV Mini-Series) - Petrus Anker
- 1974: Dunderklumpen! - Dummy (voice)
- 1975: Egg! Egg! A Hardboiled Story (Hasse & Tage film) - The Son
- 1975: Release the Prisoners to Spring (Hasse & Tage film) - Fängelsedirektören
- 1976: Face to Face - Mikael Strömberg
- 1976: En dåres försvarstal (TV Mini-Series) - Axel
- 1978: The Adventures of Picasso (The Adventures of Picasso) (Hasse & Tage film) - Picasso
- 1978: En vandring i solen - Tore
- 1979: En kärleks sommar - David Jernberg
- 1979: Lucie - Gerner
- 1979: Farbrorn som inte ville va' stor (TV Series short) - Ragnar / Narrator (voice)
- 1980: To Be a Millionaire - Stickan
- 1980: Sällskapsresan eller Finns det svenskt kaffe på grisfesten - Hotel Cleaner (uncredited)
- 1981: Från och med herr Gunnar Papphammar - Herr Gunnar Papphammar
- 1981: SOPOR (Hasse & Tage film) - John Smith (Pseudonym)
- 1981: Varning för Jönssonligan - Charles-Ingvar "Sickan" Jönsson
- 1982: The Simple-Minded Murder (Hasse & Tage film) - The New Driver
- 1982: En flicka på halsen - Kurt
- 1982: Jönssonligan och Dynamit-Harry - Charles-Ingvar 'Sickan' Jönsson
- 1982: Gräsänklingar (One Week Bachelors) - Gary
- 1983: Kalabaliken i Bender - Karl XII
- 1983: P&B - Guest at Restaurant
- 1984: The Inside Man - Stig Larsson
- 1984: Jönssonligan får guldfeber - Charles-Ingvar 'Sickan' Jönsson
- 1984: Magister Flykt (TV Series short) - Narrator (voice)
- 1985: Dödspolare - Torbjörn 'Tobbe' Skytt
- 1986: Morrhår och ärtor (also director) - Håna
- 1986: Jönssonligan dyker upp igen - Charles-Ingvar 'Sickan' Jönsson
- 1988: Vargens tid - Bjelke
- 1989: Kronvittnet - Lambert
- 1989: Jönssonligan på Mallorca - Charles-Ingvar 'Sickan' Jönsson
- 1990: Den hemliga vännen - The friend
- 1991: Underjordens hemlighet - Carson
- 1991: Duo Jag (TV Movie) - The thin man
- 1992: Vennerman och Winge (TV Series)
- 1993: The Fire Engine That Disappeared - Martin Beck
- 1993: Roseanna - Martin Beck
- 1993: Murder at the Savoy - Martin Beck
- 1993: The Man on the Balcony - Martin Beck
- 1994: The Police Murderer - Martin Beck
- 1994: Stockholm Marathon - Martin Beck
- 1995: En på miljonen - Direktör Callert
- 1996: Nu är pappa trött igen - Fadern
- 1997: Adam & Eva (1997) - Gösta Ekman (uncredited)
- 1997: Ogifta par ...en film som skiljer sig - Gösta Ekman
- 2000: Det blir aldrig som man tänkt sig - Tage Olsson
- 2000: Soldater i månsken (TV Mini-Series) - Gunnar
- 2001: Puder - Vippan
- 2001: En fot i graven (TV Series) - Viktor Melldrov
- 2003: Illusive Tracks - Pompe
- 2005: Asta Nilssons sällskap - Den välklädde mannen
- 2005: Loranga, Masarin & Dartanjang - Dartanjang (voice)

== Sources ==
- "Gösta Ekman" (in Swedish). Swedish Film Institute. Archived from the original on 6 March 2016.
