= Gabai =

Gabai may refer to:

- Gabai (surname)
- Gabbai, one who assists in the running of a synagogue
- Gabai River in Malaysia, which includes the Gabai Falls
- Gabae, name of three ancient cities

== See also ==
- Gabay
