= Anton Glanzelius =

Swedish actor (born 1974)

Anton Glanzelius (born 11 April 1974) is a Swedish former child actor and a television producer, known for his starring role in My Life as a Dog (1985), for which he was named Best Actor at the 21st Guldbagge Awards.

== Early life ==
Glanzelius was born in Copenhagen to father Ingmar Glanzelius (1927–2021), a journalist and freelance music critic, and mother Margita Ahlin, an actress and director. He has an older brother Jacob. His maternal grandfather was actor Harry Ahlin. He grew up in Gothenburg, Sweden.

== Career ==
Anton Glanzelius's first acting role was in a television movie at age eight, as a messenger in a theatrical production of Antigone that starred his mother. He appeared four times on a Swedish television series, where he was noticed by film director Lasse Hallström, who invited him to audition for the role of the boy Ingemar in My Life as a Dog. Although initially told he was too young and small for the part, Glanzelius later reported that he'd been called back a week later: "They said they couldn't find anyone better to do it than me."

In 1985, he became the youngest person to win the Swedish Film Critics Award for Best Actor for his performance in My Life as a Dog. The film was a surprise hit in the United States, a rare occurrence for a subtitled foreign language film. American critics praised Glanzelius for his performance in the film, with Hal Hinson of The Washington Post describing him as "a pint-size Jack Nicholson, with devilish eyebrows that he knows how to use," and Vincent Canby of The New York Times who applauded him for his "firm and wise performance."

Glanzelius reported at the time that although he enjoyed acting, he was not particularly interested in it as a career. There were talks about an English-language sequel, but it was never produced.

As of 2014, Glanzelius worked as an executive producer at Swedish TV4 AB, and in 2015, became the channel manager for TV4 Play, retaining his role as deputy channel director for TV4 Group.

== Personal life ==
In his youth, Glanzelius was a player on his hometown's junior soccer team, and he was interested in pursuing a career in the sport, with hopes of someday playing in Brazil.

After seeing My Life as a Dog, Michael Jackson invited Glanzelius to his Hayvenhurst estate in 1987, which he visited for a couple hours. A year later, Jackson arranged to close the Swedish amusement park Liseberg, for just the two of them. Although Glanzelius spent the following night in Jackson's hotel room, he later reported that the pop-star did not make any hint of sexual advances. Jackson kept in contact with him afterward, until the Jordan Chandler scandal broke out in 1993.

== Bibliography ==
- Holmstrom, John. The Moving Picture Boy: An International Encyclopaedia from 1895 to 1995. Norwich, Michael Russell, 1996, p. 396.
