= Fem myror är fler än fyra elefanter =

1973–75 Swedish TV-series

- Title card seen in the 1977 Sveriges Television's Christmas calendar
- Genre: Children; Christmas calendar
- Created by: Bengt Linné; Lasse Haglund
- Written by: Magnus Härenstam; Brasse Brännström; Bengt Linné; Lasse Haglund
- Starring: Magnus Härenstam; Brasse Brännström; Eva Remaeus
- Composer: Bengt Ernryd
- Country of origin: Sweden
- Original language: Swedish
- No. of seasons: 6 (3 Main seasons) and (3 Rerun seasons)
- No. of episodes: 142 (30 in the original 1973-1975 runs + the 1976 Fem Myrors Julshow, 15 in the 1977 Fem Små Myror är fler än fyra elefanter rerun edits), 28 in the 1977 Sveriges Television's Christmas calendar, 28 in the 1978-1979 rerun edits and 40 in the 1984-1985 rerun edits)

Production
- Producers: Bengt Linné; Lasse Haglund
- Running time: 30 minutes

Original release
- Network: SVT
- Release: 19 November 1973 – 24 December 1977

Fem myror är fler än fyra elefanter ('Five ants are more than four elephants') is a 1973–75 Swedish TV-series for children, hosted by Magnus Härenstam, Brasse Brännström and Eva Remaeus. The TV-series included songs and sketches with education about letters, numbers, positions (right, left, under, above, etc.), etc. Fem myror är fler än fyra elefanter was broadcast first on 19 November 1973 on TV2 by Sveriges Television and it was also broadcast as Sveriges Television's Christmas calendar 27 November –24 December 1977. Fem myror is available for purchase on VHS and DVD and there are also PC games. The animated number segments by Owe Gustafson were later exported to the American television series Sesame Street, the Israeli counterpart Rechov Sumsum, the Spanish Barrios Sésamo, and the Turkish Susam Sokaği.

== About the TV series ==
=== 1973-1974 run ===
When the series premiered its first run from November 19, 1973 to February 8, 1974, it was mostly about numbers (The letters came later in 1975), and there were 2 puppet characters named Knysten and Fräs, the set used in the sketches with Magnus, Brasse and Eva in the first 15 episodes was a simple white background

=== 1975 run ===
Letters (A, B, E, I, K, L, M, O, R and S, the rest came later in the 1977 Sveriges Television's Christmas calendar series) came along in 1975, and Knysten and Fräs have been replaced by animated stories drawn and animated by Kjell Ivan Anderson and narrated by Tomas Löfdahl, the numbers from the previous run remained for rest of the series, the set used in the sketches with Magnus, Brasse and Eva are multi-coloured background, boarder and ground, the last episode aired on May 24, 1975.

On boxing day 1976, the christmas special "Fem Myrors Julshow" premiered with the letters F and the number 2, new christmas themed sketches were filmed for this episode, this is the first time that animated stories drawn and animated by Kjell Ivan Anderson features the three friends Vera, Ellen and Cecilia narrated by Monica Zetterlund were made, more would later be made in the 1977 Sveriges Television's Christmas calendar, "Fem Myrors Julshow" reran on christmas day 1982.

Besides entertaining children, Magnus ("a pedant"), Brasse ("a slob") and Eva ("a proper person") wanted to make children interested in letters and numbers and every program (running time, ca 30 min) had 1 letter and 1 number as a theme.

The animations later in the TV-series by Owe Gustafson and Kjell Ivan Andersson, Monica Zetterlund, Tomas Löfdahl and an unknown child actor were voice-overs. Fem myror was produced by Bengt Linné & Lasse Haglund, the music was written by Bengt Ernryd and the lyrics were written by Magnus & Brasse. The animations were made by Owe Gustafson.

Fem myror also includes sketches with sets varrying depending which year they were produced in, such as Brasse's fun box (First appeared once in the 1973-1974 run and later more promiment in the 1975 run and the 1977 SVT's Sveriges Television's Christmas calendar) ("lattjo-lajban-låda"), where Brasse presents 4 animals of which 1 doesn't belong with the others and should be removed. Magnus and Eva have to guess but Brasse always thinks they're wrong; the purpose of this sketch is to teach children that one thing may have more than one property.

=== The 1977 SVT's Sveriges Television's Christmas calendar ===
1977 Fem myror was broadcast as SVT's Sveriges Television's Christmas calendar with 97 brand new sketches along with 26 sketches reused from the second run from 1975. Normally julkalendern is broadcast December 1–24, but because Fem myror had one program for every letter in the Swedish alphabet (With some new letter animations and sketches like C, D, G, H etc.), it was broadcast from 27 November and then as such, it was able to have shows for all the (then) 28 letters until December 24. (W was not considered as a separate letter until 2006, but rather as a variation of V.), 2006 Fem myror was voted 'Best children's TV-series' at Folktoppen with more than 50% of the votes., the 1977 Sveriges Television's Christmas calendar is up on SVT Play and it is the only version of the series that is available on SVT Play since the rest of the versions aren't publicly available on SVT Play due to copyright even though Sveriges Television owns the series

== Rerun edits ==
=== March 1977 ===
The first run from 1973-1974 reran in March 1977 (And again in October 1979) under the name "Fem små myror är fler är fler än fyra elefanter" with the Knysten and Fräs sketches either omitted or replaced with a animated story drawn and animated by Kjell Ivan Anderson and narrated by Tomas Löfdahl.

=== 1978-1979 ===
The 1977 Sveriges Television's Christmas calendar later reran from September 1978 to April 1979 without the hatch opening sketches and with 13 more sketches reused from the second run from 1975.

=== 1984–1985 ===
From August 1984 to June 1985, the series had 40-episode long rerun edits compiling the sketches and animations from 1973-1977, this is the version that had reruns on SVT1 from October 6, 1990 to January 13th 1991, January 16, 1993 to January 29th 1994 (Even on 100 Kilo godis), January 11, 1997 to January 10th 1998 on Bolibompa, January 13, 2001 to December 24th 2001 on morning Bolibompas at 8am, August 26, 2007 to June 22nd 2008 at 6pm on Bolibompa and even simulcasting with SVT Barn and June 30, 2012 to April 14th 2013 on SVT Barn on Bolibompa (Even was available to watch online on SVT Play at the time the episodes aired)

When the last cast member of the series Magnus Härenstam passed away on June 13, 2015, SVT1 reran the third episode (The letter M and the number 7) and the ninth episode (The letter H and the number 7) of the 1984-1985 40-episode long rerun edits to represent Magnus Härenstam's name, both episodes reran on June 21 and 22 2015

Although not receiving any reruns on TV after June 22, 2015, the series would be on SVT Play in the form of the 1984-1985 rerun edits (With episode 19 (The letter H and the number 7) and 20 (The letter Z and the number 9) being missing due to the content being unsuitable for today's audience) from December 11, 2015 to June 9th 2016 and May 12, 2017 to November 8, 2017

== Cast ==
- Magnus Härenstam as Magnus
- Brasse Brännström as Brasse
- Eva Remaeus as Eva
- Tomas Löfdahl as narrator
- Monica Zetterlund as narrator
- John Harryson as Knysten
- Helena Brodin as Fräs
- Dennis Smith as Knysten's puppeteer
- Annty Landherr as Fräs' puppeteer

== Home media releases ==
- Around 1982 and 1983, Warner Home Video released 8 volumes of the series compiling sketches from 1973-1977 which would later be re-released by Kanal 10 in 1993
- The first 8 volumes would later be compiled into 3 2-3-hour long tapes released by Kanal 10 and Carlton Home Entertainment Sweden in 1995
- 1997 would see the release of "Mest om Siffror" released by Independent Video
- In 2000, Independent Video would re-released the 3 tapes released by Kanal 10 and Carlton Home Entertainment Sweden and rediting them by either removing or adding new sketches, they would later be released on DVD in 2001 by Vision Park Video and Pan Vision
- A 4-dvd boxset containing the 3 DVD releases and an extra disc containing a compilation of sketches from the 1977 Sveriges Television's Christmas calendar in 2008, and later reissued by SF Studios in 2014

== Episodes ==
Season	Episodes	Originally released		
Season	Episodes	First released	Last released	Network
1	15	November 19, 1973	February 8, 1974	SVT2
2	15	February 15, 1975	May 24, 1975	SVT2
3	15	March 7, 1977	March 21, 1977	SVT2
4	28	November 27, 1977	December 24, 1977	SVT2
5	28	September 10, 1978	April 1, 1979	SVT2
6	40	August 26, 1984	June 9, 1985	SVT2

== CD releases ==
- Fem myror är fler än fyra elefanter (1975)
- Fler myror och elefanter (1977)
- Fem myror är fler än fyra elefanter (2001, Combines Fem myror är fler än fyra elefanter and Fler myror och elefanter into 1 CD)
