= Maximteatern =

Theatre in Stockholm, Sweden

The Maxim Theatre
- Maximteatern
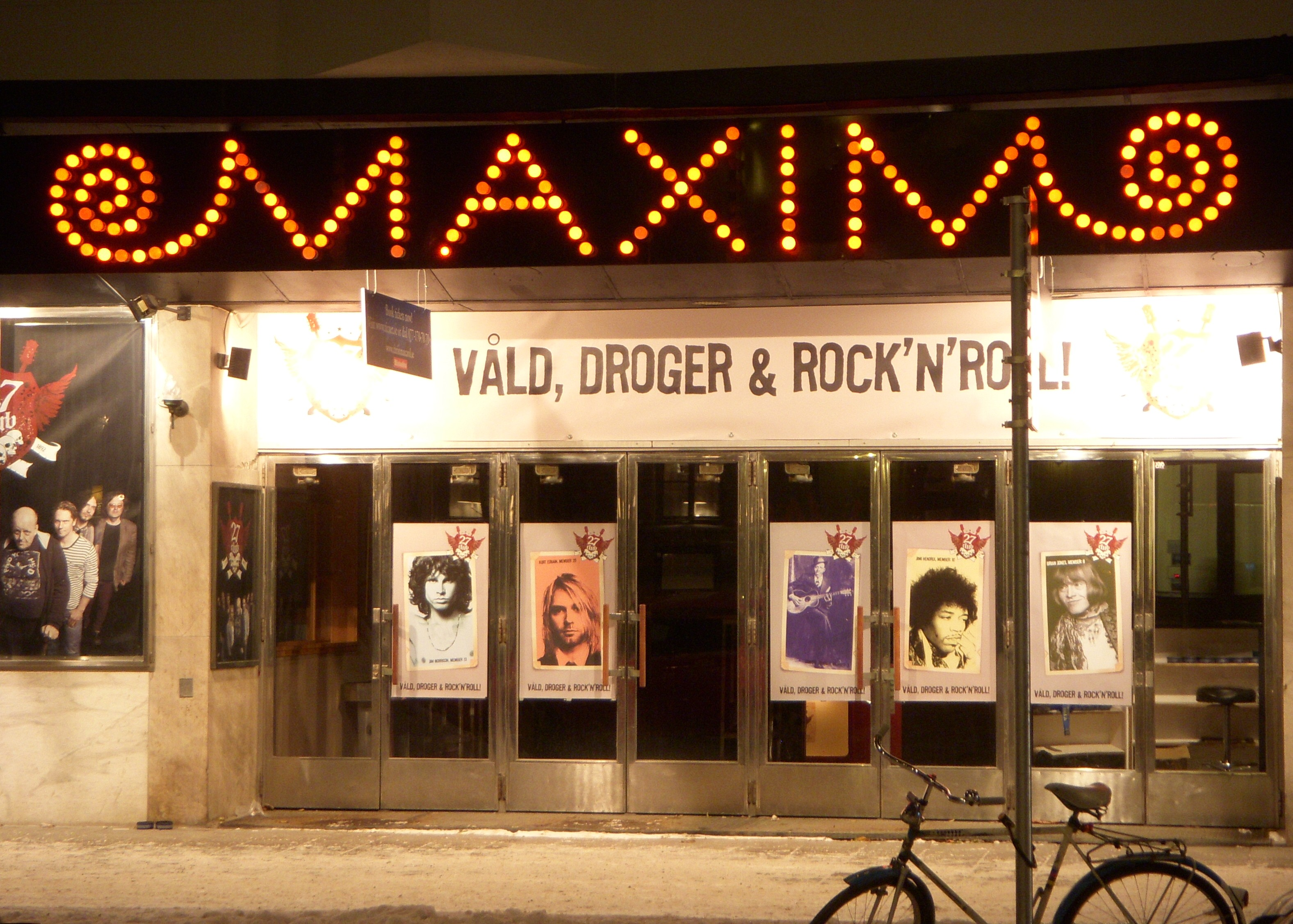
- Maximteatern in December 2010
- Interactive map of The Maxim Theatre
- Coordinates: 59°20′12.86″N 18°05′19.93″E

Maximteatern, called "Maxim" in English or The Maxim Theatre, has been a popular private theatre at Karlaplan in central Stockholm, Sweden since the 1960s.

Originally named the Karlaplansstudion, it was designed as a theatre for film screenings. The house was built in 1945–46 by architect Ernst Grönvall. It was originally used as a studio by Swedish Radio who aired the popular radio shows Karusellen (The Carousel) and Frukostklubben (The Breakfast Club) from there in the 1940s and 1950s. In 1963, The Beatles played their first gig outside of the United Kingdom and Germany there; the performance was included on the Anthology 1 compilation album in 1995. In 1967 the studio was rebuilt into a theatre and movie theatre, but from the 1970s onwards has run exclusively as a theatre.

In the 1980s, the Limabrall company took over the management of Maximteatern. Behind Limabrall were Lill Lindfors, Magnus Härenstam, Brasse Brännström and Aller Johansson – all well-known names in the Swedish entertainment industry. Productions such as SPÖK, Omaka par (The Odd Couple), Skål (Cheers) and Arsenik och gamla spetsar (Arsenic and Old Lace) were among the most successful productions in the 1980s and 1990s.

Since 2003 the theatre has been run by a company called Proscenia.
