= Father to Be =

- Directed by: Lasse Hallström
- Written by: Lasse Hallström; Brasse Brännström; Olle Hellbom
- Starring: Magnus Härenstam
- Cinematography: Roland Lundin
- Edited by: Lasse Hallström
- Music by: Bengt Palmers
- Production company: Svensk Filmindustri
- Distributed by: Svensk Filmindustri
- Release date: 1 December 1979
- Running time: 107 minutes
- Country: Sweden
- Languages: Swedish, English.

Father to Be (Swedish: Jag är med barn) is a 1979 Swedish comedy-drama film directed by Lasse Hallström.

== Plot ==
Bosse (Magnus Härenstam) is a young ad man, fascinated with cinema, with secret dreams of being an author. He meets Lena (Anki Lidén) at a diner, and after a period of dating, she becomes pregnant. Bosse tries to deal with the situation through an imaginary friend (Micha Gabay), an English-speaking American inspired by various tough guys from American genre films, with a knack for impulsive action but little respect for or understanding of fatherhood.

== Cast ==
- Magnus Härenstam as Bosse - De unga älskande
- Anki Lidén as Lena - De unga älskande
- Micha Gabay as Den avskyvärde kompisen
- Lis Nilheim as Sekreterare
- Gösta Engström as Kalle
- Ulf Brunnberg as Björn
- Lars Amble as Åke, reklambyråchef
- Lars Göran Carlsson as Reklamman
- Barbro Hiort af Ornäs as Greta, sjuksyster
- Stig Ossian Ericson as Reklamfilmsregissör
- Gunilla Thunberg as Expedit i bokhandel
- Lillemor Ohlsson as Reklamfilmstjej
- Mats Arehn as Reklamfilmskund
- Lars Lennartsson as Äldre herre på restaurang
- Torbjörn Ehrnvall as Reklamman
- Hans Harnesk as Kille i Victoria-kön
- Jan Halldoff as Kändis som går före i Victoria-kön
- Kerstin Bagge as Tjej i Victoria-kön
- Rune Söderqvist as Reklamman
- Billy Gustavsson as Reklamman
- Tomas Löfdahl as Reklamman
- Arne Andersson as Reklamman
