= My Life as a Dog =

- Film poster
- Directed by: Lasse Hallström
- Screenplay by: Lasse Hallström; Reidar Jönsson; Brasse Brännström; Per Berglund
- Based on: Mitt liv som hund by Reidar Jönsson
- Produced by: Waldemar Bergendahl
- Starring: Anton Glanzelius; Tomas von Brömssen; Anki Lidén; Manfred Serner; Melinda Kinnaman; Lennart Hjulström; Ing-Marie Carlsson
- Cinematography: Jörgen Persson
- Edited by: Christer Furubrand; Susanne Linnman
- Music by: Björn Isfält
- Distributed by: AB Svensk Filmindustri
- Release date: 12 December 1985 (Sweden)
- Running time: 101 minutes
- Country: Sweden
- Language: Swedish
- Box office: $8.3 million (North America)

My Life as a Dog (Swedish: Mitt liv som hund) is a 1985 Swedish drama film co-written and directed by Lasse Hallström. It is based on the first novel of a semi-autobiographical trilogy by Reidar Jönsson. It tells the coming-of-age story of Ingemar, a young boy sent to live with relatives. The cast includes Anton Glanzelius, Melinda Kinnaman, and Tomas von Brömssen.

Released in Sweden on 12 December 1985, the film was released in 1987 in the United States, where it became a surprise hit. The film was nominated for two Academy Awards that year in the categories of Best Director and Best Adapted Screenplay, and won the Golden Globe Award for Best Foreign Language Film.

== Plot ==
The action takes place in Sweden from 1958 to 1959. Rambunctious twelve-year-old Ingemar gets into all sorts of trouble and adventures with his Sickan, his beloved dog. His mischief and roughhousing with his older brother Erik are taking a toll on their single mother, who unbeknownst to Ingemar is terminally ill. To allow her to rest and recover, Ingemar and Erik are sent separately to live with relatives. Ingemar is placed with his maternal uncle Gunnar and his wife Ulla in a small rural town in Småland, near a famous glassworks. Ingemar is not allowed to bring Sickan with him, despite his protestations, and he is told she will be sent to stay in a kennel. Ingemar is welcomed by Ulla and Gunnar, and he and his uncle bond over the construction of a backyard summer house and their love of Povel Ramel's recording of "Far, jag kan inte få upp min kokosnöt" (which drives Ulla crazy).

Among the eccentric residents of the town are Saga, an assertive tomboy Ingemar's own age who comes to like him, which she shows by beating him in a boxing match; Fransson, a man who is continually hammering the roof of his house; and Mr. Arvidsson, an elderly man who lives on the first floor of their house and gets Ingemar to read out loud to him from a lingerie catalog, which he hides from his wife.

At the end of summer, Ingemar is reunited with his family, but his mother's health soon takes a turn for the worse and she is hospitalized. He and Erik first go to stay with their uncle Sandberg in the city, but his wife dislikes the boys and insists they be sent away. Their mother dies, and Ingemar is sent back to Småland.

Mr. Arvidsson has since died, and Gunnar and Ulla now share the house with a large Greek family. Gunnar welcomes him and consoles him as best he can, but as the house is now crowded, he tells Ingemar he will be rooming with Mrs. Arvidsson in another house. Ingemar remains hopeful about being reunited with Sickan and continues to ask Gunnar when she can come stay with him. Meanwhile, Ingemar becomes the object of contention between Saga and a female classmate who is interested in him. When they start fighting over him, he grabs onto Saga's leg and starts barking like a dog. She becomes upset by his strange behavior and challenges him to a boxing match. During the bout, out of spite, Saga tells Ingemar that Sickan was really euthanized. This, along with his mother's death, is too much for him, and he locks himself inside the "summer house" overnight. While secluded there, Ingemar reflects on the death of his mother, the loss of Sickan, and the changing world. Ingemar uses the experiences of others and of his own personal loss to reconcile a life which is sometimes tough.

Throughout the film, Ingemar tells himself over and over that it could have been worse, reciting several examples, such as a man who took a shortcut onto the field during a track meet and was killed by a javelin and the story of the dog Laika several times, the first creature sent into orbit by the Russians (without any way to get her back down).

The film ends with the radio broadcast of a famous heavyweight championship boxing match, between Swede Ingemar Johansson and American Floyd Patterson. When Johansson wins, the whole town erupts with joy, but the now-reconciled Ingemar and Saga are fast asleep together on a couch, holding each other.

== Cast ==
- Anton Glanzelius as Ingemar
- Tomas von Brömssen as Uncle Gunnar
- Melinda Kinnaman as Saga
- Anki Lidén as Ingemar's mother
- Manfred Serner as Erik
- Kicki Rundgren as Aunt Ulla
- Lennart Hjulström as The artist
- Ing-Marie Carlsson as Berit
- Leif Ericson as Sandberg
- Christina Carlwind as Mrs. Sandberg
- Ralph Carlsson as Harry
- Viveca Dahlén as Washing woman
- Arnold Alfredsson as Manne's grandfather
- Fritz Elofsson as Master
- Vivi Johansson as Mrs. Arvidsson
- Didrik Gustafsson as Arvidsson
- Jan-Philip Hollström as Manne, the boy with green hair
- Johanna Udéhn as Lilla
- Klimpen as Sickan, Ingemar's dog

== Reception ==
=== Release ===
The film was first released in Sweden on 12 December 1985, and had its American premiere on 1 May 1987, being released there by Skouras Pictures. It became a critical and commercial success with American audiences, a rare feat for a subtitled foreign language film at the time. The international success of the film launched director Lasse Hallström's Hollywood career, as he would go on to direct What’s Eating Gilbert Grape and The Cider House Rules in the following years.

=== Critical response ===
The movie was well-received by critics. On the review aggregator website Rotten Tomatoes, 100% of 35 critics' reviews are positive. The website's consensus reads: "A coming-of-age story with uncommon depth and sensitivity, My Life as a Dog is sweet, sincere, and utterly charming."

Desson Thomson of The Washington Post called the movie a "well-constructed crowd-pleaser" and Molly Haskell of Vogue wrote, "This is a coming-of-age film in the fullest sense of the term: we watch Ingemar grow up before our eyes, and turn into a human being who can live with the harsh memories as well as the more lyrical ones."

Vincent Canby of The New York Times gave a more mixed review, but also said the movie "(in its funnier moments)…recalls the gravity with which Francois Truffaut remembered childhood." In New York, David Denby wrote the scenes of Ingemar's mother expertly blend "intimacy with pain" and recall the work of Ingmar Bergman. Universal acclaim went to the performance of Anton Glanzelius, whom Hal Hinson described as "a pint-size Jack Nicholson, with devilish eyebrows that he knows how to use".

In his book Timequake, the author Kurt Vonnegut cited the film to be one of his favorites, alongside Casablanca and All About Eve.

Actor Robert Duvall once referred to the film as his all-time favorite.

== Awards ==
The film was nominated for two Academy Awards: Best Director and Best Screenplay Based on Material from Another Medium. It won the Golden Globe Award for Best Foreign Language Film in 1988, as well as two Guldbagge Awards, the Swedish equivalent to the Academy Awards, in the categories of Best Film and Best Actor.

Award	Category	Name	Outcome
60th Academy Awards	Best Director	Lasse Hallström	Nominated
60th Academy Awards	Best Adapted Screenplay	Lasse Hallström, Reidar Jönsson, Brasse Brännström, Per Berglund	Nominated
BAFTA Awards	Best Foreign Language Film	Waldemar Bergendahl, Lasse Hallström	Nominated
Bodil Awards	Best European Film	Lasse Hallström	Won
Boston Society of Film Critics Awards	Best Foreign Language Film		Won
Directors Guild of America Awards	Outstanding Directorial Achievement in Motion Pictures	Lasse Hallström	Nominated
45th Golden Globe Awards	Best Foreign Language Film		Won
21st Guldbagge Awards	Best Film		Won
21st Guldbagge Awards	Best Actor	Anton Glanzelius	Won
Independent Spirit Awards	Best Foreign Film	Lasse Hallström	Won
Lucas - International Festival of Films for Children and Young People	Children's Section	Lasse Hallström	Won
New York Film Critics Circle Awards	Best Foreign Language Film		Won
Robert Awards	Best Foreign Film	Lasse Hallström	Won
Seattle International Film Festival	Best Film		Won
Young Artist Awards	Special Award - Best Family Foreign Film		Won
Young Artist Awards	Special Award - Best Young Actor in a Foreign Film	Anton Glanzelius	Won
Young Artist Awards	Special Award - Best Young Actress in a Foreign Film	Melinda Kinnaman	Won

== Attempted sequel/trilogy ==
A production was said to have been in the works in the early 1990s on an English language sequel titled either My Life as a Dog at Sea or My Father, His Son. In this version, Ingemar has aged four years from the days in the 1950s when his ailing mother sent him off to live with relatives in the country. At 16, he is aboard a freighter in the Mediterranean Sea and the Atlantic, searching for his sailor father, having adventures in North African ports and misadventures with young women on land and at sea. Anton Glanzelius was in talks to reprise his role and Reidar Jonsson was to return as screenwriter. Jonsson was also to have been the film's producer. The film was to have been directed by Graeme Clifford. According to Jonsson, it was to have been part of a planned trilogy. The project was later abandoned.

In 2009, a sequel was again said to be in the making, with a production start date in 2010, Daniel Fridell as director, and a different actor portraying a teenaged Ingemar, but these plans also did not materialize.

== See also ==
- My Life as a Dog, 1996–97 Canadian series inspired by the film
