= 21st Guldbagge Awards =

Annual Swedish film awards ceremony

- Date: 27 January 1986
- Site: Chinateratern/Bern salonger, Stockholm, Sweden

Highlights
- Best Picture: My Life as a Dog

The 21st Guldbagge Awards ceremony, presented by the Swedish Film Institute, honored the best Swedish films of 1985, and took place on 27 January 1986. My Life as a Dog directed by Lasse Hallström was presented with the award for Best Film.

== Awards ==
- Best Film: My Life as a Dog by Lasse Hallström
- Best Director: Hans Alfredson for False as Water
- Best Actor: Anton Glanzelius for My Life as a Dog
- Best Actress: Malin Ek for False as Water
- The Ingmar Bergman Award: Kerstin Eriksdotter
