= Reidar Jönsson =

Swedish writer (born 1944)

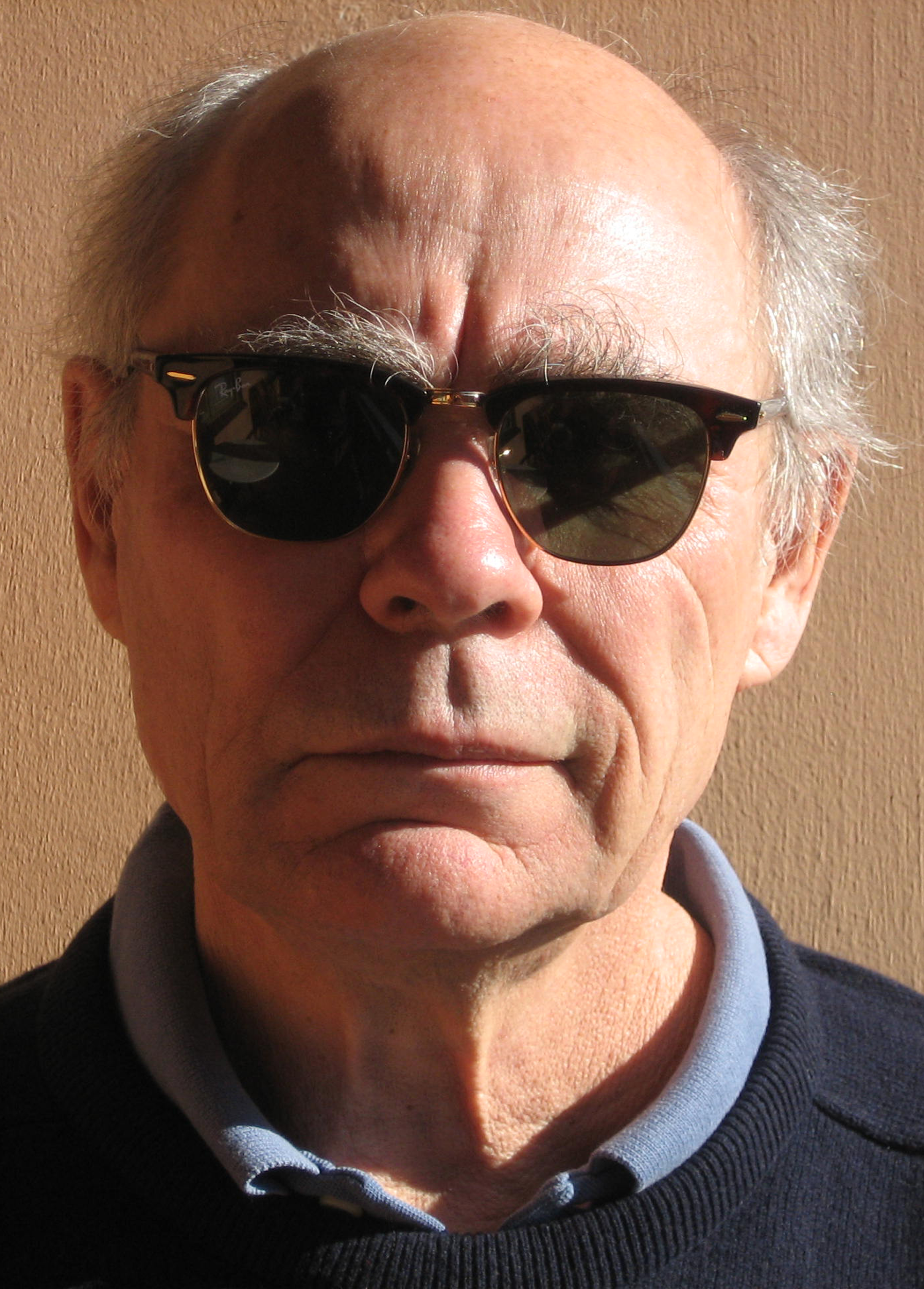
- Born: Reidar Vallis Håkan Jönsson; 16 June 1944 (age 80); Malmö, Skåne County, Sweden
- Occupation: Author

Reidar Vallis Håkan Jönsson (born June 16, 1944, Malmö) is a Swedish author. He is best known for the 1983 semi-autobiographical novel Mitt liv som hund, which was adapted into the film My Life as a Dog. His co-written screenplay for the film was recognized with a nomination at the 60th Academy Awards.

== Bibliography ==
- 1969 – Endast för vita
- 1970 – En väldig borg
- 1971 – En borgares död
- 1972 – Emilia Emilia!
- 1973 – Hemmahamn
- 1976 – Svenska bilder
- 1976 – Levande livet!
- 1977 – Hemmahamn och sjöfolk
- 1978 – Röster från ett varv
- 1980 – Kvinnliga brottstycken
- 1982 – Farfar på rymmen
- 1983 – Mitt liv som hund
- 1985 – Vägarbete
- 1987 – Vägval
- 1988 – En hund begraven
- 1993 – Svenska hjältar
- 1994 – Gå på vatten
- 2002 – C'est vrai!
- 2009 – Trampa däck
- 2010 – Hundens paradis
- 2011 – Springa läck
- 2012 – Vad mitt öga såg
- 2016 - En God Man
- 2017 - Vännen i Havanna
- 2017 - Kasta Loss
- 2019 - Dikt Midskepps
- 2020 - Tomhetens Triumf
