= Gabay =

Surname

Gabay is an English, Dutch, French, Spanish and Jewish surname, and derives from the Aramaic word Gabbai. The name is usually borne by people of Israeli Jewish descent. For people with the surname spelled Gabai, see Gabai. Notable people with the surname include:

- Eli Gabay, Canadian actor
- Ilya Yankelevich Gabay (1935–1973), Soviet civil rights activist
- Michael "Micha" Gabay (born 1947), Swedish actor
- Ronen Gabay, Israeli football player and manager
- Yuval Gabay (born 1963), Israeli-American drummer
