= Svenska Sesam =

Swedish adaptation of the US children's series Sesame Street

Svenska Sesam is the short-lived second Swedish adaptation of the popular American children's series Sesame Street. The series aired in 1981 at 5:30 p.m. on the channel then called TV2.

== Cast ==
Actors:

- Lill Lindfors
- Magnus Härenstam
- Nils Eklund
- Gunilla Åkesson
- Svante Thuresson
- Lennart Loberg

Muppets and additional characters:

- Bert and Ernie
- Kakmonstret (Cookie Monster)
- Kermit (Kermit the Frog)
- Grover
- Greven (Count von Count)
- Hansson and Fia Jansson (animated characters, developed specifically for this show)

== Crew ==
- "GALA TEATER-manus": Birgitta Götestam and Peter Flack
- Animation: Owe Gustafson
- Music: Anders Ekdahl
- Producer: Lasse Haglund
