= Brasse Brännström =

Swedish actor

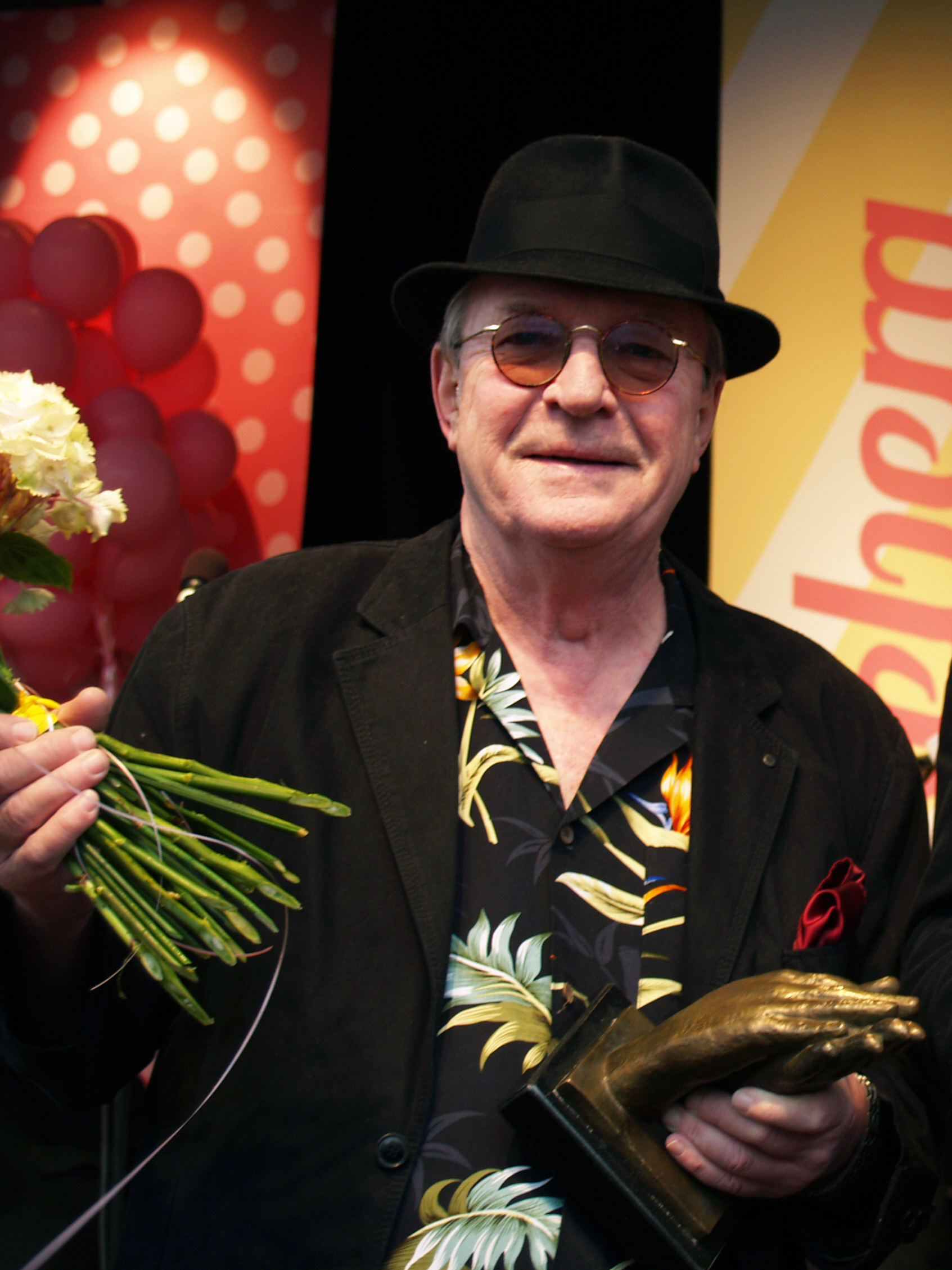
- Brännström in April 2013
- Born: Lars Erik Brännström; 27 February 1945; Stockholm, Sweden
- Died: 29 August 2014 (aged 69); Stockholm, Sweden
- Resting place: Skogskyrkogården, Stockholm, Sweden
- Occupation: Actor
- Years active: 1972–2014
- Spouse: Git Erixon (m. 1995–2002)
- Partner: Lill Lindfors (1974–1984)

Brasse Brännström (real name Lars Erik Brännström; 27 February 1945 – 29 August 2014) was a Swedish actor and comedian.

Brännström attended Adolf Fredrik's Music School in Stockholm. In 1970, he gained fame alongside Magnus Härenstam and Lasse Hallström, when they made their first television program Oj är det redan fredag. During the 1980s, Brännström managed Maximteatern in Stockholm with Magnus Härenstam, Lill Lindfors, and Aller Johansson, in a company called Limabrall. He is also known for hosting the children's TV-program Fem myror är fler än fyra elefanter (with Magnus Härenstam & Eva Remaeus), which was popular and has been re-broadcast numerous times.

In 1988, he was nominated for an Academy Award for Best Screenplay Based on Material from Another Medium as co-writer of the screenplay for My Life as a Dog.

== Selected filmography ==
- Åsa-Nisse – wälkom to Knohult (2011)
- Kenny Begins (2009)
- Hon och Hannes (TV) (2005–06)
- Den bästa av mödrar (2005)
- Paradiset (2003)
- Swedenhielms (TV) (2003)
- Dieselråttor & sjömansmöss (TV) (2002)
- Sprängaren (2001)
- En ängels tålamod (TV) (2001)
- Gossip (2000)
- Den bästa sommaren (2000)
- Pelle Svanslös (TV, julkalendern) (1997)
- Mitt sanna jag (TV) (1995)
- Sköna juveler (1984)
- Två killar och en tjej (1983)
- Kalabaliken i Bender (1983)
- Mannen som blev miljonär (1980)
- Magnus och Brasse Show (TV) (1980)
- Skyll inte på mig! (TV) (1977)
- En kille och en tjej (1975)
- Pappas pojkar (TV) (1973)
- Fem myror är fler än fyra elefanter (TV) (1973)
- Oj är det redan fredag (TV) (1970)
