= Happy We =

1983 film by Lasse Hallström

- Directed by: Lasse Hallström
- Written by: Brasse Brännström; Lasse Hallström; Magnus Härenstam
- Starring: Brasse Brännström; Magnus Härenstam
- Cinematography: Roland Lundin
- Edited by: Lasse Hallström; Jan Persson
- Music by: Anders Berglund
- Production company: Svensk Filmindustri
- Distributed by: Svensk Filmindustri
- Release date: 25 March 1983
- Running time: 111 minutes
- Country: Sweden

Happy We (Swedish: Två killar och en tjej) is a 1983 Swedish film directed by Lasse Hallström.

== Cast ==
- Brasse Brännström – Thomas Bengtsson
- Magnus Härenstam – Klasse Wallin
- Pia Green – Anna Wallin
- Lars Amble – Fredrik Wahlgren
- Gösta Engström – Gammal studiekamrat
- Ewa Fröling – Doctor
- Svea Holst – Gammal patient
