= A Guy and a Gal =

1975 film by Lasse Hallström

A Guy and a Gal En kille och en tjej
- Film poster
- Directed by: Lasse Hallström
- Written by: Brasse Brännström (as Lasse Brännström)
- Produced by: Olle Hellbom; Bengt Forslund
- Starring: Brasse Brännström
- Cinematography: Lasse Hallström
- Edited by: Lasse Hallström
- Music by: Berndt Egerbladh
- Production companies: Svensk Filmindustri; Svenska Filminstitutet
- Release date: June 25, 1975
- Running time: 94 minutes
- Country: Sweden
- Language: Swedish
- Box office: 9,439,000 kr (Sweden)

A Guy and a Gal (Swedish: En kille och en tjej) is a 1975 Swedish comedy film directed by Lasse Hallström, in his feature film directorial debut. It was the most popular film in Sweden in 1975 with receipts of 9,439,000 Swedish krona in the first six months of release.

== Cast ==
- Brasse Brännström - Lasse
- Mariann Rudberg - Lena
- Christer Jonsson - Bosse
- Börje Ahlstedt - Lasse's brother
- Roland Hedlund - Lena's stepfather
- Chatarina Larsson - Berit
- Anna Godenius - Lasse's ex
- Gun Jönsson - Lena's mother
- Claire Wikholm - Berit
- Janne Forsell - Guy at discothèque
- Magnus Härenstam - Party guest
- Else-Marie Brandt - Lasse's mother
- Lena T. Hansson - Wallflower
- Eddie Axberg - Patient at the clinic
- Tomas Bolme - Guest at the party watching television
