= Bolibompa =

Swedish children's television series

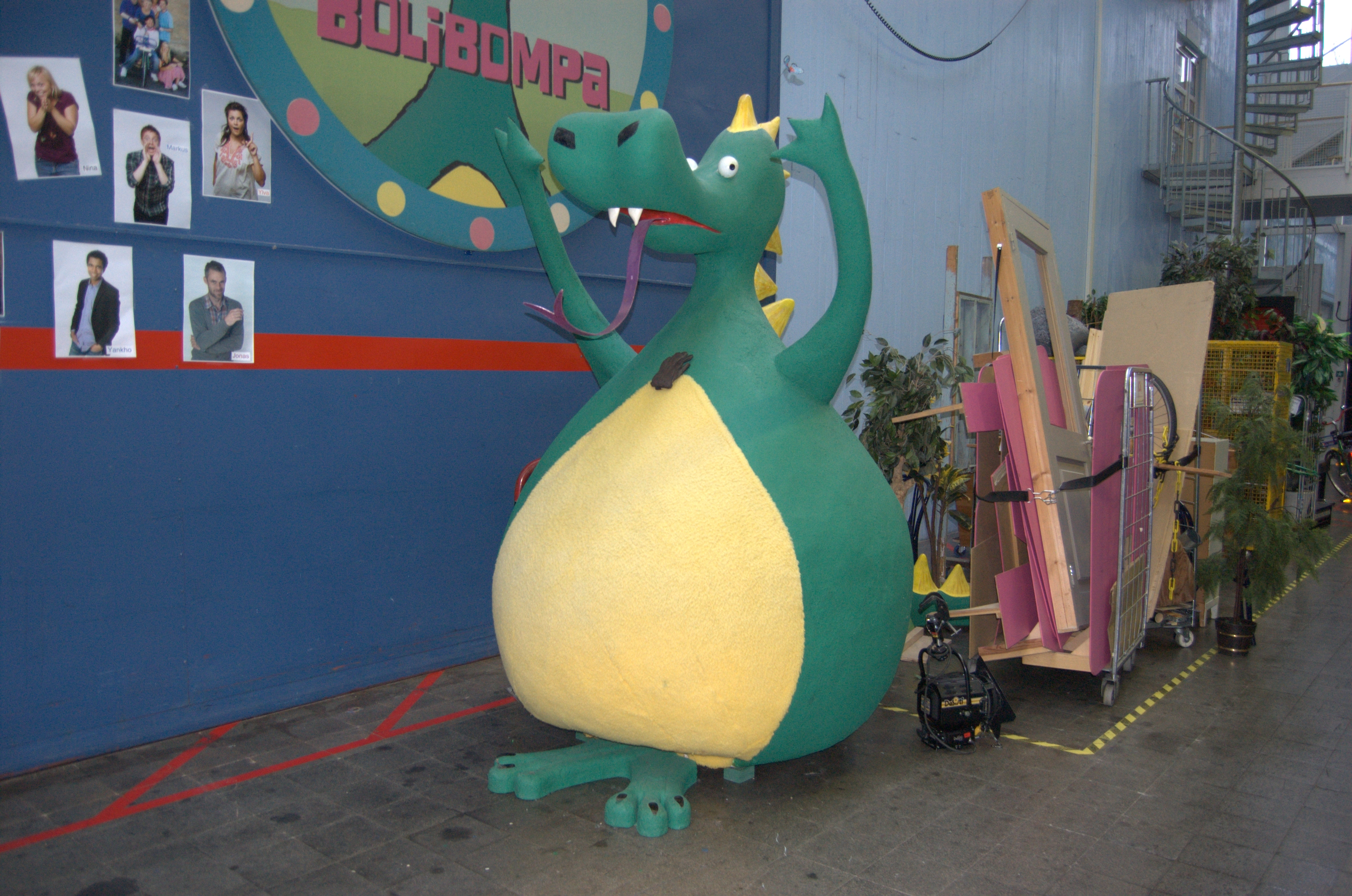
- The mascot, Bolibompadraken, in 2010
- Genre: Children's television series
- Country of origin: Sweden
- Original language: Swedish

Production
- Producer: Sveriges Television

Original release
- Release: August 31, 1987

Bolibompa is a Swedish children's television series produced by Sveriges Television (SVT). It first aired in 1987 and SVT continues to regularly produce Bolibompa related content as of 2022. Each episode consists of several short segments presented by one or occasionally several of the series hosts. At the end of each segment the host presents another children's program. After the episode ends Bolibompa returns with another, usually live, segment. The main Bolibompa series which had been airing most evenings since 1987 got taken out of production at the end of 2022 but the Bolibompa name and its mascot will continue to be used for other television programming.

== 1987–2014 ==
The Bolibompa signature theme was introduced on 31 August 1987–[2015] and the accompanying intro on 23 September 1989. The music to and the word Bolibompa itself were created by composer Lasse Dahlberg; the word bolibompa itself was invented by Dahlberg and his producer Mona Sjöström who wanted to create a children's rhyme with both rhythm and inspiration from Africa. It was also he and his children who were heard in the theme used during the first twelve years. Dahlberg was also responsible for the earlier intro for Barnprogram on TV2 ("Kom nu rå – vaddå – barnprogram i tevetvå!!"). The intro was made by graphic artist/animator Bryan Foster. It featured the dragon that was then featured in the new intro produced by the Dallas agency that started in 1999.

The original theme was as follows:

Barnprogram! Ja!
Bolibompa, bolibomp-bomp-a.
Bolibompa, bolibomp-bomp-a.
Bolibompa, bolibomp-bomp-a.
Bolibompa, bolibomp-bomp-a.
Boli-boli-boli-boli-bompa.
– Har du sett …
– Va?! …
– Kanal 1!

Even after the rename of Kanal 1 to SVT1 in 1996, the intro was still in use. This was replaced on September 24, 1999 with a new intro and a new tune, with graphics devised by Dallas Sthlm. From now on, Bolibompa became the official name of the program.

Bolibompa has undergone major changes since 1987, but the core concept as a frame for other content was kept for several decades. Until 1990 it was only presenting other programs without dedicated hosts or original content. In 2005 Bolibompa started broadcasting in the mornings on top of the usual 18:00-19:00 slot.

The program moved to SVT B (known as Barnkanalen on air) on 25 August 2008 upon a revision of the evening schedules of SVT1 and 2, leaving its former channel after nearly 21 years on air. This also affected other children's programs that aired on said channels.

== 2015–present ==
The show underwent major changes in January 2015. The production moved away from the old set to a new one featuring the Bolibompa dragon's house. The dragon itself was made more prominent. The goal of these changes was to appeal to pre-schoolers. The evening broadcast is shortened to 30 minutes and the morning broadcast, which used to go under the name Bolibompa as well was renamed to Morgonshowen (Literally the morning show).

Morgonshowen consisted, just like Bolibompa, of other children's programmes interspersed with short segments from the host. These segments included a daily dressing race and toothbrushing, the intention being that children would follow along before school or pre-school. In 2019 Morgonshowen stopped broadcasting with the same children's programs being broadcast at the same time without Morgonshowen as a frame. SVT cited decreasing viewer figures and most children watching their content digitally as reasons for the change.

Since 2015 Bolibompa has also launched several spin-off shows such as Bolibompa: Draken och äggmysteriet ("The dragon and the eggmystery"), Bolibompa Baby and Bolibompa: Prinsessorna och Pruttas hämnd ("The princesses and Pruttas revenge"). To differentiate the show previously known as just Bolibompa it was renamed Bolibompa: Drakens trädgård ("The dragon's garden"). Drakens trädgård was produced until 2017 after which it has been doing reruns. As a replacement came Drakens hotell ("The dragon's hotel") where the dragon started to talk. In 2021 a new short lived concept was introduced, Bolibompaklubben ("The Bolibompa club"). It was a show where the dragon interacts with children both in person and through video chat, recordings, sent in drawings and more. Bolibompaklubben was cancelled at the end of 2022 bringing the main evening segment to an end. As a consequence, new programs in the Bolibompa universe were created, primarily for SVT Play, with the main Bolibompa brand leaving linear television after 35 years on air.
