= Gabai (surname) =

Gabai is a surname. Notable people with this surname include:

- David Gabai, American mathematician
- Eliyahu Gabai (born 1943), Israeli politician
- Sasson Gabai, Israeli actor
- Yisroel Meir Gabbai

== See also ==
- Gabay
