= Gabae =

Gabae was the ancient name of:

- Isfahan, city of Iran
- Koktepe, Sogdian fortress
- Tel Shush, city in Galilee
