= Magnus Härenstam =

Swedish actor

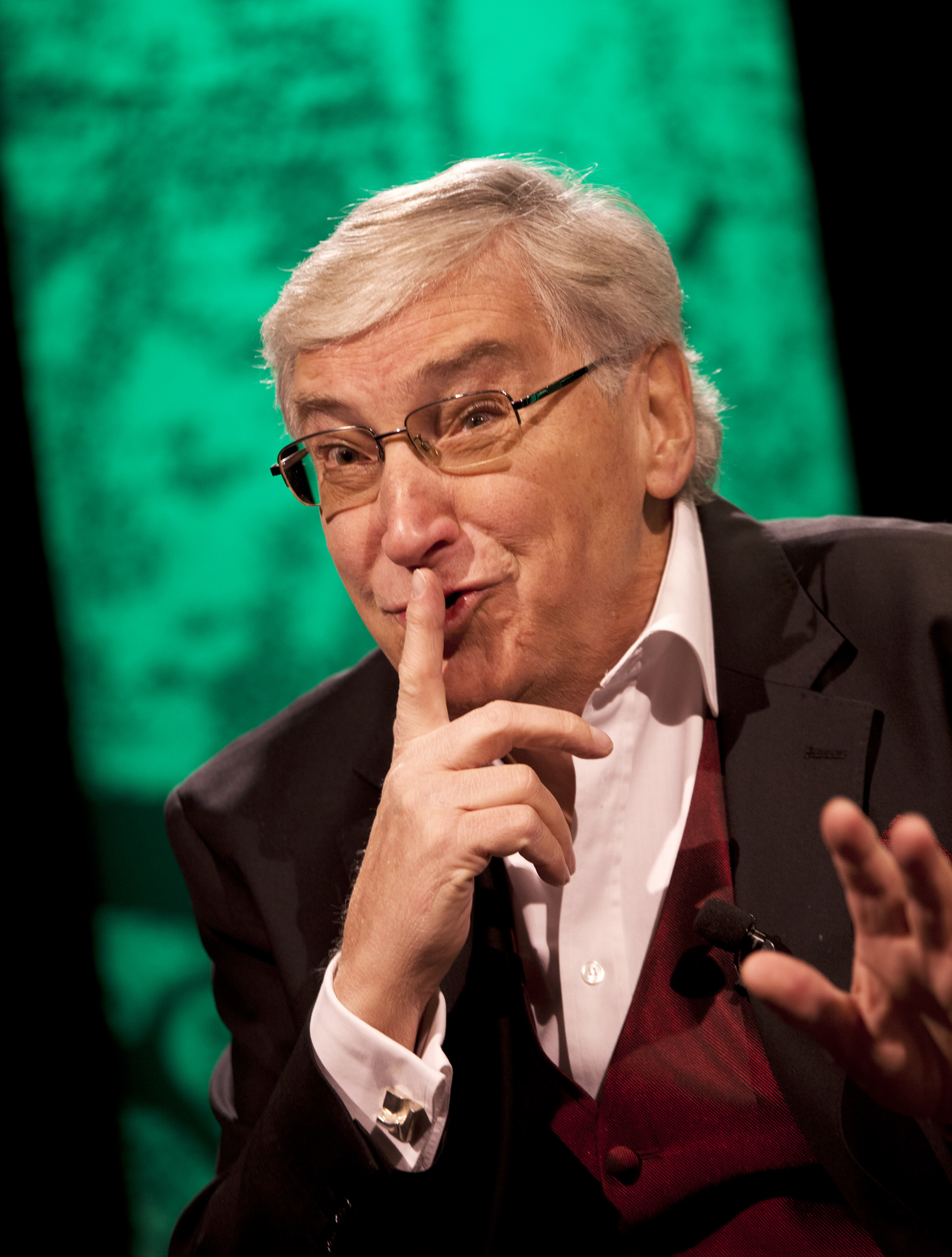
- Magnus Härenstam in 2012.
- Born: Johan Herbert Magnus Härenstam; 19 June 1941; Västervik, Sweden
- Died: 13 June 2015 (aged 73); Stockholm, Sweden
- Occupations: Television host, actor
- Years active: 1968–2015
- Known for: Fem myror är fler än fyra elefanter
- Spouses: Anita Bendel (m. 1972–2003) Birgitta Ryott (m. 2010–2015)

Johan Herbert Magnus Härenstam (19 June 1941 – 13 June 2015) was a Swedish television host, actor and comedian. Härenstam hosted the Swedish version of the game-show Jeopardy! for 14 years before being replaced by Adam Alsing. Härenstam is also known for hosting the children's TV-program Fem myror är fler än fyra elefanter (with Brasse Brännström & Eva Remaeus), which was very popular and has been re-broadcast numerous times since it first aired. Härenstam participated in the music video for ABBA's hit song "When I Kissed the Teacher" where he played the teacher who got kissed by Agnetha Fältskog. Well known in Sweden for several decades, he was almost equally popular in Norway, having starred in the 1990s sitcom Fredrikssons fabrikk, playing the Swedish boss of a Norwegian textile workshop.

Härenstam died on 13 June 2015, six days before his 74th birthday, after a several-year-long fight with cancer.

== Partial filmography ==
- Skratt (1968, TV Short)
- Oj, är det redan fredag? (1970, TV Series)
- Fem myror är fler än fyra elefanter (1973, TV Series) - Magnus
- Pappas pojkar (1973, TV Series) - Martin Bengtsson
- Fimpen (1974) - Mackan
- Levande på Nya Bacchi (1974, Theatre)
- En kille och en tjej (1975) - Party Guest
- Kamrer Gunnarsson i skärgården (1976, TV Movie) - Kamrer Gunnarsson
- Varning för barn (1976, Theatre)
- When I Kissed the Teacher (1976, Video short) - The Teacher
- Skyll inte på mig! (1978, TV Series) - Magnus
- Det är serverat (1978, Theatre)
- The Adventures of Picasso (1978) - Hitler
- Jag är med barn (1979) - De unga älskande - Bosse
- Magnus och Brasse Show (1980, TV Series)
- Sällskapsresan (1980) - Dr. B. A:son Levander
- Sopor (1981) - Ulf Adelsohn
- Tuppen (1981) - Cederqvist
- Göta kanal eller Vem drog ur proppen (1981) - Kronofogden
- Svenska Sesam (1981, Swedish version of Sesame Street)
- En flicka på halsen (1982) - Hot Dog Vendor
- Två killar och en tjej (1983) - Klasse Wallin
- Jokerfejs (1984)
- Hemma hoz (1985, TV Mini-Series)
- Bombardemagnus (1985)
- Card Sharks (1987–1990, TV Series)
- Macken - Roy's & Roger's Bilservice (1990) - Edvard
- Fredrikssons fabrikk (1990–1993, TV Series) - Direktør Hasse Fredriksson
- Jeopardy! (1991–2005, TV Series) - Television host
- Fredrikssons fabrik – The movie (1994) - Fredriksson
- Bert: The Last Virgin (1995) - Roland Ebert
- Vuxna människor (1999) - Frank's boss
- Tarzan (1999, Swedish dub)
- Hälsoresan – En smal film av stor vikt (1999) - Dr. Levander
- Karlsson på taket (2002) - Filip, thief (voice)
- The Incredibles (2005, Swedish dub)
- Winners and Losers (2005) - Himself
- Muntergökarna (2005, Theatre)
- Lite som du (2005-2006, TV Series) - Ralf Sundin
- Sigillet (2006) - Rektor Magnificus
- Cars (2006, Swedish dub)
- Göta kanal 2 – Kanalkampen (2006) - Peter Black
- Stjärnorna på slottet (2007)
- Göta kanal 3 – Kanalkungens hemlighet (2009) - Peter Black
- Vem tror du att du är? (2009)
- Up (2009, Narrator in Swedish version)
- Bamse and the City of Thieves (2014) - Reinard Räv (voice)
