= Lasse Hallström =

Swedish filmmaker (born 1946)

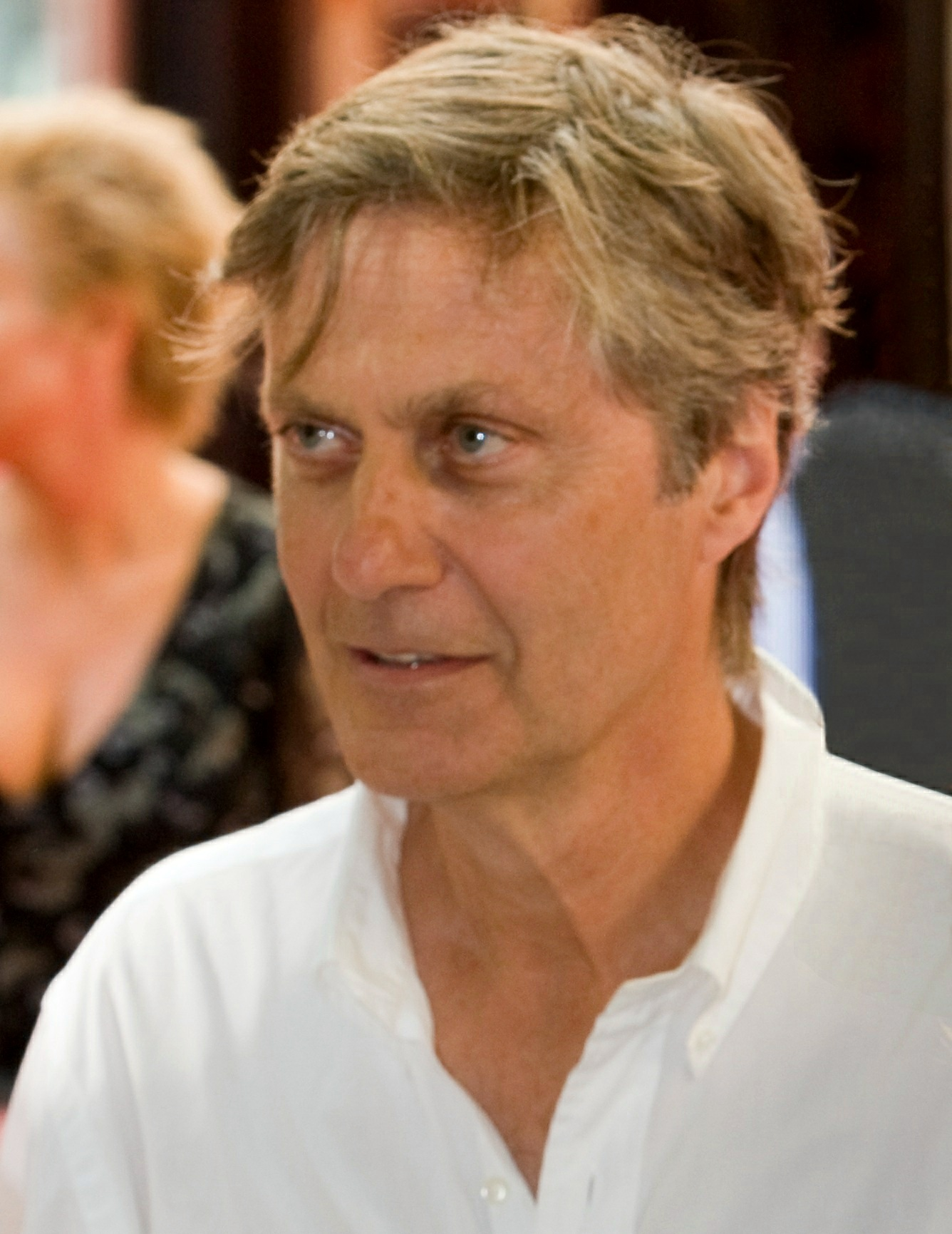
- Hallström in 2011
- Born: Lars Sven Hallström; 2 June 1946 (age 80); Stockholm, Sweden
- Occupations: Film director, screenwriter
- Years active: 1973–present
- Spouses: Malou Hallström (m. 1974; div. 1981); Lena Olin (m. 1994)
- Children: 2

Lars Sven "Lasse" Hallström (Swedish: [ˈlâsːɛ ˈhâlːstrœm]; born 2 June 1946) is a Swedish film director. He first became known for directing almost all music videos by the pop group ABBA, and came to international attention with My Life as a Dog (1985). He is also known for What's Eating Gilbert Grape (1993), The Cider House Rules (1999), and Chocolat (2000). He has been nominated for the Academy Award for Best Adapted Screenplay, as well as the Academy Award for Best Director twice.

== Early life and education ==
Lena Olin and Lasse Hallström in 2026.

Lars Sven "Lasse" Hallström was born on 2 June 1946 in Stockholm, Sweden. His father was a dentist and keen amateur videographer; his mother was the author and poet Karin Lyberg.

He attended Adolf Fredrik's Music School in Stockholm, where he made his first music video and 8 mm films.

== Career ==
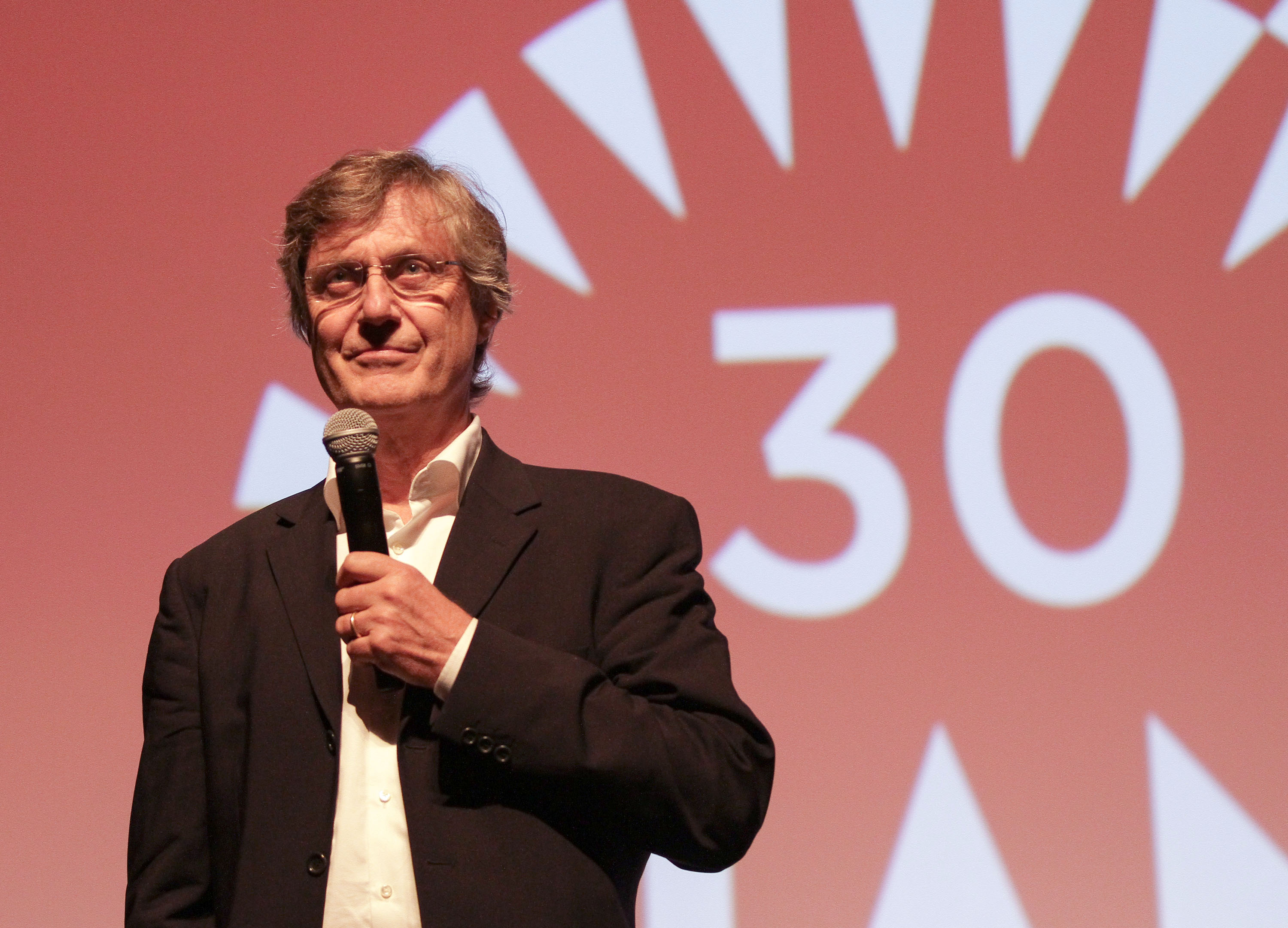
Hallström at a Career Achievement Tribute at the 2013 Miami International Film Festival

In the late 1960s, Hallström worked as a director of short pop music clips at Sveriges Television.

He made his directorial debut in 1973, directing the comedy series Pappas pojkar for Swedish TV. He frequently collaborated with comic actors Magnus Härenstam and Brasse Brännström during his Swedish period.

Between 1974 and 1982, Hallström worked with the Swedish group ABBA on many of their music videos and also directed their 1977 film ABBA: The Movie. Almost all of ABBA's promotional films were directed and shot by Hallström, with only seven exceptions: "When I Kissed the Teacher" (1977); "Chiquitita" (1979), which was made by the BBC; "I Have a Dream" (1979); "On and On and On" (1980); "Lay All Your Love on Me" (1981); "The Day Before You Came" (1982), and "Under Attack" (1982), the latter two being directed by Kjell Sundvall and Kjell-Åke Andersson.

After the international success of My Life as a Dog (1985), Hallström started working in Hollywood. His first English-language film was Once Around (1991). His first notable English-language success was What's Eating Gilbert Grape (1993), starring Johnny Depp and Leonardo DiCaprio.

Hallström made a number of successful film adaptations from novels. In 1999, The Cider House Rules was released. He followed that success the following year by directing Chocolat, starring Johnny Depp, Juliette Binoche, and Judi Dench, which was a critical and box-office success. His 2001 film The Shipping News was adapted from a Pulitzer Prize-winning novel by E. Annie Proulx and starred Kevin Spacey, Judi Dench, Julianne Moore, and Cate Blanchett.

His 2011 film Salmon Fishing in the Yemen, based on the 2007 novel of the same name by Paul Torday, starred Ewan McGregor and Emily Blunt.

His 2017 film, A Dog's Purpose, based on the 2010 novel of the same name, was billed as "a celebration of the special connection between humans and their dogs".

Hallström directed and executive produced the 2024 American-Icelandic Nordic Noir thriller television series The Darkness, starring his wife Lena Olin, who has collaborated with him on other films.

== Personal life ==
Hallström married media personality and actress Malou Hallström in 1974. They divorced in 1981.

In 1990, he met actress Lena Olin, and they married on 18 March 1994. They have a daughter. In 2011 the couple were residing in Bedford, New York, and also had a home in the Stockholm Archipelago.

Hallström turned vegan in 2014.

== Videography ==
(The following is a complete list of all the ABBA music videos that were directed by Lasse Hallström.)

- 1974 – "Waterloo"
- 1974 – "Ring Ring"
- 1975 – "Mamma Mia"
- 1975 – "SOS"
- 1975 – "Bang-A-Boomerang"
- 1975 – "I Do, I Do, I Do, I Do, I Do"
- 1976 – "Fernando"
- 1976 – "Dancing Queen"
- 1976 – "Money, Money, Money"
- 1977 – "Knowing Me, Knowing You"
- 1977 – "That's Me"
- 1977 – "The Name of the Game"
- 1978 – "Take a Chance on Me"
- 1978 – "Eagle"
- 1978 – "One Man, One Woman"
- 1978 – "Thank You for the Music"
- 1978 – "Summer Night City"
- 1979 – "Does Your Mother Know"
- 1979 – "Voulez-Vous"
- 1979 – "Gimme! Gimme! Gimme! (A Man After Midnight)"
- 1979 – "Estoy Soñando"
- 1980 – "Conociéndome, Conociéndote"
- 1980 – "Gracias por la Música"
- 1980 – "The Winner Takes It All"
- 1980 – "Super Trouper"
- 1980 – "Happy New Year"
- 1980 – "Felicidad"
- 1981 – "When All Is Said and Done"
- 1981 – "One of Us"
- 1981 – "No Hay A Quien Culpar"
- 1982 – "Head over Heels"

== Filmography ==
- 1975 – A Guy and a Gal
- 1977 – ABBA: The Movie
- 1979 – Father to Be
- 1981 – Tuppen
- 1983 – Two Boys and a Girl
- 1985 – My Life as a Dog
- 1986 – The Children of Noisy Village
- 1987 – More About the Children of Noisy Village
- 1991 – Once Around
- 1993 – What's Eating Gilbert Grape
- 1995 – Something to Talk About
- 1999 – The Cider House Rules
- 2000 – Chocolat
- 2001 – The Shipping News
- 2005 – An Unfinished Life
- 2005 – Casanova
- 2006 – The Hoax
- 2009 – Hachi: A Dog's Tale
- 2010 – Dear John
- 2011 – Salmon Fishing in the Yemen
- 2012 – The Hypnotist
- 2013 – Safe Haven
- 2014 – The Hundred-Foot Journey
- 2017 – A Dog's Purpose
- 2018 – The Nutcracker and the Four Realms
- 2022 – Hilma
- 2024 – The Darkness (TV series)
- 2025 – The Map That Leads to You

== Awards and nominations ==
Awards and nominations received by Hallström's films
Year	Title	Academy Awards		BAFTA Awards		Golden Globe Awards	
Year	Title	Nominations	Wins	Nominations	Wins	Nominations	Wins
1985	My Life as a Dog	2		1		1	1
1993	What's Eating Gilbert Grape	1				1	
1995	Something to Talk About					1	
1999	The Cider House Rules	7	2	1		2	
2000	Chocolat	5		8		4	
2001	The Shipping News			2		2	
2011	Salmon Fishing in the Yemen					3	
2014	The Hundred-Foot Journey					1	
Total		15	2	12	0	15	1

Directed Academy Award performances
Under Hallström's direction, these actors have received Academy Award nominations (and one win) for their performances in their respective roles.

Year	Performer	Film	Result
Academy Award for Best Actress
2000	Juliette Binoche	Chocolat	Nominated
Academy Award for Best Supporting Actor
1993	Leonardo DiCaprio	What's Eating Gilbert Grape	Nominated
1999	Michael Caine	The Cider House Rules	Won
Academy Award for Best Supporting Actress
2000	Judi Dench	Chocolat	Nominated

== See also ==
- ABBA discography
