= Michael Gabay =

Swedish actor (born 1947)

Michael "Micha" Gabay (born 21 January 1947 in Landvetter, Sweden) is a Swedish actor.

Gabay started as child actor at Stora Teatern in Gothenburg. When he finished his education in 1971 he played plays at Gothenburg City Theatre in many years, among them Svempa in Om 7 flickor (1972), Laertes in Hamlet (1977) and the title role in Eugen Oneigin (1984). 1987 he played a gangster in Arsenik och gamla spetsar at Liseberg Theatre. He has appeared in many TV series, among them as Tok-Harry in Hedebyborna (1978). Besides the acting, he has worked with business; he has owned a jeans factory.

== Selected filmography ==
- 1975 - Lady Inger of Oestraat
- 1976 - Raskens (TV)
- 1977 - Bröderna Lejonhjärta
- 1978 - Hedebyborna (TV)
- 1979 - Father to Be
