= Eva Remaeus =

Swedish actress

- Born: Eva Britt Remaeus; February 13, 1950; Lund, Scania, Sweden
- Died: January 29, 1993 (aged 42); Gran Canaria, Canary Islands, Spain
- Occupation: Actress
- Years active: 1972-1993
- Spouse: Jan Jönson (m. 1982; div. 1991)
- Children: 1

Eva Britt Remaeus (13 February 1950 - 29 January 1993) was a Swedish actress.

== Biography ==
Born in Lund, Remaeus starred in the Swedish film Sven Klangs kvintett, the thriller The Man on the Roof, as well as the child television series Fem myror är fler än fyra elefanter.

She also appeared in Xerxes (1988; TV mini-series), Det är långt till New York (1988) and Prins hatt under jorden (1980).

Remaeus was mother to Jovanna Remaeus Jönson, née Remaeus (born 10 August 1982). Eva Remaeus died of a brain tumour in Gran Canaria two weeks and one day before her 43rd birthday.
