= Hal Hinson =

American film critic

- Born: United States
- Occupations: Film critic, writer

Hal Hinson is an American film critic who wrote for The Washington Post from 1987 to 1997. As of July 2015 he has 887 reviews collected on the website Rotten Tomatoes. Hinson has been cited as a critic who is unpopular with his fellow critics, as he is not afraid to give a polarized review; for instance, he lauded Hudson Hawk, which was otherwise panned. Another example is his review for Super Mario Bros., which went against the critical consensus. Hinson wrote an essay on Montgomery Clift, entitled "Some Notes on Method Acting" for Sight & Sound in 1984. He also reviewed for Film Comment in the mid-1980s.
