= List of actors who have played multiple roles in the same film =

This is a list of actors who have played multiple roles in the same film. This does not include:

- Actors who play a character with multiple names and/or a secret identity (e.g. superheroes);
- Actors who play multiple copies of a single character (e.g. Hugo Weaving as Agent Smith in The Matrix franchise). However, dual roles (e.g. Jeff Bridges as Kevin Flynn and Clu in Tron) and clone characters (e.g. Temuera Morrison as Jango Fett and the Clone troopers in Star Wars: Episode II – Attack of the Clones) are included in this list;
- Voice actors who do not physically appear on screen in multiple roles (e.g. in The Lord of the Rings film trilogy, John Rhys-Davies portrays Gimli on screen, but Treebeard is only voiced by him);
- Non-speaking extras, background artists or stock characters (e.g. Redshirts);
- Compilation films (e.g. Charlie Chaplin Festival), or anthology films with separate, unconnected stories (e.g. Everything You Always Wanted to Know About Sex* (*But Were Afraid to Ask)).

== A ==
- Bud Abbott as Eddie L. Morrison, T. S. Chandler and their grandmother in Little Giant (1946)
- Bud Abbott as Cuthbert Greenway and Ralph Greenway in The Time of Their Lives (1946)
- Bud Abbott as Mr. Dinkel and Mr. Dinklepuss in Jack and the Beanstalk (1952)
- Yahya Abdul-Mateen II as Russell Thomas and his doppelgänger Weyland in Us (2019)
- Yahya Abdul-Mateen II as Morpheus and a program similar to Agent Smith in The Matrix Resurrections (2021)
- Junko Abe as journalist Sakurako Takamiya and nurse Yui Takeda in The Prisoner of Sakura (2019)
- Victoria Abril as identical twins Clara and Ana in Too Much Heart (1992)
- Amy Adams as Amelia Earhart and Tess in Night at the Museum: Battle of the Smithsonian (2009)
- Paul Adelstein as Bob Bob, Roberto, beach jock #2, a sportscaster, and Abraham Lincoln's aide in Bedazzled (2000)
- Isabelle Adjani as Anna and Helen in Possession (1981)
- Ben Affleck as himself, Holden McNeil, and Chuckie Sullivan in Jay & Silent Bob Strike Back (2001)
- Knut Agnred as Sören Skärberg, Emilio and Göte Kåla in Stinsen brinner ...filmen alltså (1991)
- Brian Aherne as John Evans and Malcolm Scott in The Man Who Lost Himself (1941)
- Filiz Akın as Mehtap and Hacer in Yankesici Kız (1964)
- Filiz Akın as Mehtap and Yıldız in Hırsız Kız (1968)
- Filiz Akın as Gül and Jale in İşportacı Kız (1970)
- Filiz Akın as Selma and Sevgi in Ömrümce Unutamadım (1971)
- Filiz Akın as Selma and Belma in Soyguncular (1973)
- Hans Albers as Michael von Prack and Alexej Alexandrowitsch von Prack in Hangmen, Women and Soldiers (1935)
- Hans Albers as General Oronta and Jonny in Jonny Saves Nebrador (1953)
- Vera Alentova as Carol Abzats, Zemfira Almazova, Lusiena Krolikova and Whitney Crolikow in Shirli-Myrli (1995)
- Evan Alex as Jason Wilson and his doppelgänger Pluto in Us (2019)
- Tim Allen as Scott Calvin/Santa Claus and Toy Santa in The Santa Clause 2 (2002)
- Joe Alwyn as a collectibles appraiser, Jerry, and Joseph in Kinds of Kindness (2024)
- Don Ameche as Karl Freyman and Mario Signarelli in Sins of Man (1936)
- Don Ameche as Larry Martin and Baron Manuel Duarte in That Night in Rio (1941)
- Charlene Amoia as Rachel Thompson and a Sunnyvale customer in Fear Street Part One: 1994 (2021)
- Charlene Amoia as Beth Kimball and Rachel Thompson in Fear Street Part Three: 1666 (2021)
- Gillian Anderson as Widow Wadman and herself in A Cock and Bull Story (2005)
- Benz Antoine as Bobby Seale and Rabbit Brown in I'm Not There (2007)
- Christina Applegate as Princess Rosaline and Julia Malfete in Just Visiting (2001)
- Ramesh Aravind as Devaraj and Devaraj and also both of their respective fathers in Ulta Palta (1997)
- Cüneyt Arkın as Çetin and Ali Cengiz in Silahların Sesi (1965)
- Cüneyt Arkın as Nejat and Osman in Aşk ve İntikam (1965)
- Cüneyt Arkın as Tarık and Ahmet in İki Yabancı (1966)
- Cüneyt Arkın as Kemal and Orhan Şahin in Yüzbaşı Kemal (1967)
- Cüneyt Arkın as Malkoçoğlu and his son Polat in Malkoçoğlu Cem Sultan (1969)
- Cüneyt Arkın as Ali and his father Ahmet in Büyük Yemin (1969)
- Cüneyt Arkın as Islam Bey/Anton Kuravich and Petr Alekseevich in Ottoman Eagle (1969)
- Cüneyt Arkın as Battal Gazi, Hüseyin Gazi, Cafer in Battal Gazi Destanı (1971)
- Cüneyt Arkın as Kara Murat and his father in Kara Murat Fatih'ın Fedaisi (1972)
- Cüneyt Arkın as Battal Gazi and Seyyit Battal in Battal Gazi Geliyor (1973)
- Cüneyt Arkın as Battal Gazi and his father in Battal Gazi'nin Oğlu (1974)
- Cüneyt Arkın as Kara Murat and Mehmet in Kara Murat Kara Şövalyeye Karşı (1975)
- Cüneyt Arkın as Kılış Aslan and his father Süleyman Shah in Kılış Aslan (1975)
- Cüneyt Arkın as Olcayto, Halit and Başbuğ Toluğ Bey in Hakanlar Çarpışıyor (1978)
- Cüneyt Arkın as detective Murat and agent Brad in 3 Supermen Against the Godfather (1979)
- George Arliss as Mayer Rothschild and Nathan Rothschild in The House of Rothschild (1934)
- George Arliss as Richard Fraser and Lord Duncaster in His Lordship (1936)
- Tom Arnold as Mark 'Pappy' Jeung and himself in Brother's Justice (2010)
- Malaika Arora as Hetal, Sarla and Anarkali (in item song) in Housefull 2 (2012)
- David Arquette as Max's dad and a Cookie Giant in The Adventures of Sharkboy and Lavagirl (2005)
- Patricia Arquette as Renee Madison and Alice Wakefield in Lost Highway (1997)
- Sergei Artsibashev as Kirill and his father Kirill Grigoryevich in Promised Heaven (1992)
- Mamoudou Athie as Will, Neil, and a morgue nurse in Kinds of Kindness (2024)
- Rowan Atkinson as Lord Edmund Blackadder/King Edmund III and Centurion Blackaddicus in Blackadder: Back & Forth (1999)
- Erin Austen as Mary Bechdel and Constance Bechdel in Fackham Hall (2025)
- Albert Austin as American soldier, clean-shaven German soldier, bearded German soldier and the Kaiser's driver in Shoulder Arms (1918)
- Albert Austin as man in shelter and the car thief in The Kid (1921)
- Albert Austin as street sweeper and burglar in City Lights (1931)
- Richard Ayoade as Dr. Marshall, the Great Yogi, and the Editor/Narrator in The Wonderful Story of Henry Sugar and Three More (2024)
- Dan Aykroyd as Shire Judge Reeve Valkenheiser and Bobo in Nothing But Trouble (1991)

== B ==
- Mohan Babu as Ranga and Rajaram in Billa Ranga (1982)
- Mohan Babu as Venkata Ramana and Ashok in Allari Police (1994)
- Mohan Babu as Bharath in Punya Bhoomi Naa Desam (1994)
- Mohan Babu as M Dharmaraju and Satyam in M. Dharmaraju M.A. (1994)
- Mohan Babu as Pedarayudu and Raja in Pedarayudu (1995)
- Mohan Babu as Dasari Sivaji and Gayatri Patel in Gayatri (2018)
- Sobhan Babu as Ramarao and the killer in Potti Pleader (1966)
- Sobhan Babu as Prasada Rao and Vasu in Tahsildar Gari Ammayi (1971)
- Sobhan Babu as Dr. Venu and Jagan in Manavudu Danavudu (1972)
- Sobhan Babu as Husband and Doctor in Sarada (1973)
- Sobhan Babu as Raja and Ravi Kumar in Monagadu (1976)
- Sobhan Babu as D.S.P. Vijayabhaskar and Kalidasu in Khaidi Kalidasu (1977)
- Sobhan Babu as Sudarshanam and Ravi in Gadusu Pillodu (1977)
- Sobhan Babu as Sridhara Rao and Raja in Karthika Deepam (1979)
- Sobhan Babu as Raghava Rao and Ravi in Kodallostunnaaru Jagratha (1980)
- Sobhan Babu as Raghava Rao and Vijay alias Jagamondi in Jagamondi (1981)
- Sobhan Babu as Sankar Rao and Murali in Korukunna Mogudu (1982)
- Sobhan Babu as Commissioner Kamal Nath and Advocate Srinath in Prathikaram (1982)
- Sobhan Babu as Sobhan and Jagan in Jagan (1984)
- Sobhan Babu as Gopal and Tiger in Kode Trachu (1984)
- Sobhan Babu as Satyam and Arun in Vijrumbhana (1986)
- Sobhan Babu as Raja and Inspector Rambabu in Dorikithe Dongalu (1989)
- Abhishek Bachchan as Nandu Bhide and Vicky Grover in Happy New Year (2014)
- Amitabh Bachchan as Shyamu and Deepak in Bandhe Haath (1973)
- Amitabh Bachchan as Raj Thakur and Dharam Chand in Adalat (1976)
- Amitabh Bachchan as Amit and Shankar in Kasme Vaade (1978)
- Amitabh Bachchan as Don and Vijay in Don (1978)
- Amitabh Bachchan as Jay and C.I.D. inspector Vijay in The Great Gambler (1979)
- Amitabh Bachchan as Ravi Anand and Babu in Satte Pe Satta (1982)
- Amitabh Bachchan as Master Dinanath and Raju (father and son) in Desh Premee (1982)
- Amitabh Bachchan as Sudhir Roy and Adhir Roy (Brothers) in Bemisal (1982)
- Amitabh Bachchan as Amit/Rana Ranbeer, Guru and inspector Shankar (father & his sons) in Mahaan (1983)
- Amitabh Bachchan as David D'Costa and Inspector Vijay Shandaliya in Aakhree Raasta (1986)
- Amitabh Bachchan as Shyam and Toofan in Toofan (1989)
- Amitabh Bachchan as Inspector Arjun Singh and Bade Miyan in Bade Miyan Chote Miyan (1998)
- Amitabh Bachchan as Thakur Bhanupratap Singh and Heera Singh in Sooryavansham (1999)
- Amitabh Bachchan as Lal "Baadshah" Singh and Ranbir Singh in Lal Baadshah (1999)
- Amitabh Bachchan as Frank James Williams and Major Frank John Williams in Hum Kaun Hai? (2004)
- Bae Doona as Tilda Ewing, Megan's mom, Mexican woman, Sonmi-451, Sonmi-351, and Sonmi prostitute in Cloud Atlas (2012)
- Buddy Baer as Sgt. Riley and the Giant in Jack and the Beanstalk (1952)
- William Bakewell as Louis XIV and his twin brother in The Iron Mask (1929)
- Nandamuri Balakrishna as Arun Kumar and Ramudu in Apoorva Sahodarulu (1986)
- Nandamuri Balakrishna as Ramudu and Bheemudu in Ramudu Bheemudu (1988)
- Nandamuri Balakrishna as Harishchandrudu and Dushyantudu in Brahmarshi Viswamitra (1991)
- Nandamuri Balakrishna as Sri Krishnadeva Rayalu and Krishna Kumar in Aditya 369 (1991)
- Nandamuri Balakrishna as Arjun and Kishtayya in Maatho Pettukoku (1995)
- Nandamuri Balakrishna as Srikrishnudu and Arjunudu in Sri Krishnarjuna Vijayam (1996)
- Nandamuri Balakrishna as Rama Krishna Prasad and Bhavani Prasad in Peddannayya (1997)
- Nandamuri Balakrishna as Sultan and Pruthvi in Sultan (1999)
- Nandamuri Balakrishna as Chennakesava Reddy and Bharat in Chennakesava Reddy (2002)
- Nandamuri Balakrishna as Rajith Kumar and Giri in Allari Pidugu (2005)
- Nandamuri Balakrishna as Raghupathi Raghava Rajaram and Veera Venkata Satyanarayana Swamy in Okka Magaadu (2008)
- Nandamuri Balakrishna as Pundarika Ranganathudu and Lord Krishna in Pandurangadu (2008)
- Nandamuri Balakrishna as Srimannarayana and Narasimha in Simha (2010)
- Nandamuri Balakrishna as Jai Simha and Chakradhar in Parama Veera Chakra (2011)
- Nandamuri Balakrishna as Harish Chandra Prasad, Rama Krishna Prasad and Bobby in Adhinayakudu (2012)
- Nandamuri Balakrishna as Jaidev and Krishna in Legend (2014)
- Nandamuri Balakrishna as Akhanda and Murali Krishna in Akhanda (2021)
- Nandamuri Balakrishna as Veera Simha Reddy and Jai Simha Reddy in Veera Simha Reddy (2023)
- Nandamuri Balakrishna as Akhanda and Murali Krishna in Akhanda 2 (2025)
- Christian Bale as Alfred Borden and his twin brother Bernard Fallon in The Prestige (2006)
- Antonio Banderas as Hunter Cabot and multiple of his ancestors in Paddington in Peru (2024)
- Bhanu Bandopadhyay as Shakti Kinkar and Bhakti Kinkar in Bhranti Bilas (1963)
- Lino Banfi as Peppino Patanè and his father Calogero Patanè in La moglie in bianco... l'amante al pepe (1980)
- Ike Barinholtz as Le Chiffre, Prophet, and Dane Cook in Meet the Spartans (2008)
- Ike Barinholtz as The Policeman, Wolf, Anton Chigurh, Hellboy, Batman, and Alex "Alexander" (Beowulf), and Prince Caspian in Disaster Movie (2008)
- Ellen Barkin as Penny Priddy and Peggy Banzai in The Adventures of Buckaroo Banzai Across the 8th Dimension (1984)
- Sacha Baron Cohen as Ali G and Borat (cameo) in Ali G Indahouse (2002)
- Sacha Baron Cohen as Admiral General Haffaz Aladeen/Alison Burgers and his double Efawadh in The Dictator (2012)
- Richard Barthelmess as Lance McGowan and Robert Anders in Midnight Alibi (1934)
- Kenny Basumatary as Deep and Deepu in Local Kung Fu 2 (2014)
- Mathew Baynton as William Shakespeare, Lord Burghley, English messenger and customs official in Bill (2015)
- Ralph Bellamy as Sir Edward Dominey and Baron Leopold von Ragenstein in The Great Impersonation (1942)
- Jean-Paul Belmondo as Michel Gauché and Bruno Ferrari in Animal (1977)
- Roberto Benigni as Dante and Johnny Stecchino in Johnny Stecchino (1991)
- Henry Bergman as Henry Bergman as fat German sergeant, Paul von Hindenburg and Bartender in Shoulder Arms (1918)
- Henry Bergman as Professor Guido and night shelter keeper in The Kid (1921)
- Henry Bergman as sheriff on train and man in railroad station in The Pilgrim (1923)
- Henry Bergman as mayor and blind girl's downstairs neighbor in City Lights (1931)
- Elisabeth Bergner as Sylvina Lawrence and Martina Lawrence in Stolen Life (1939)
- Halle Berry as a Moriori woman, Jocasta Ayrs, Luisa Rey, an Indian party guest, Ovid, and Meronym in Cloud Atlas (2012)
- P. Bhanumathi as Vaani and Valli in Kalai Arasi (1963)
- Craig Bierko as John Ferguson, Douglas Hall, and David in The Thirteenth Floor (1999)
- Cate Blanchett as a fictional version of herself and her cousin in Coffee and Cigarettes (2004)
- Cate Blanchett as 13 different roles in Manifesto (2015)
- Jack Black as Asmodeus, "Satan", and "Santa Claus" in Dear Santa (2024)
- Brian Blessed as Duke Frederick and Duke Senior in As You Like It (2006)
- Zoë Bleu as Elisabeta and Mina in Dracula (2025)
- Graeme Blundell as Alvin Purple and Balls McGee in Alvin Rides Again (1974)
- Ray Bolger as Hunk and the Scarecrow in The Wizard of Oz (1939)
- Helena Bonham Carter as Dr. Serena Kogan and Skynet in Terminator Salvation (2009)
- Christian Borle as Mr. Smee and George Darling in Peter Pan Live! (2014)
- Bourvil as Mathieu Dumont, 'Toine Dumont and Martial Dumont in All the Gold in the World (1961)
- Bruce Boxleitner as Alan Bradley and Tron/Rinzler in Tron (1982) and Tron: Legacy (2010)
- Richard Brake as Dr. Wolfgang and Orlock in The Munsters (2022)
- Kenneth Branagh as Mike Church and Roman Strauss in Dead Again (1991)
- Klaus Maria Brandauer as Bror von Blixen-Finecke and his twin brother Hans von Blixen-Finecke in Out of Africa (1985)
- Nicholas Braun as Andy Kaufman and Jim Henson in Saturday Night (2024)
- Neil Breen as Cade and Cale Altair in Twisted Pair (2018) and Cade: The Tortured Crossing (2023)
- Walter Brennan as D.J. Mulrooney and Knobby in The Gnome Mobile (1967)
- Madeline Brewer as Alice and her doppelganger in Cam (2018)
- Beau Bridges as Louis XIV and Philip in The Fifth Musketeer (1979)
- Jeff Bridges as Kevin Flynn and Clu in Tron (1982) and Tron: Legacy (2010)
- Jim Broadbent as Captain Molyneux, Vyvyan Ayrs, Timothy Cavendish, Korean musician, and prescient 2 in Cloud Atlas (2012)
- Mel Brooks as Governor William J. LePetomane, Yiddish Indian chief, aviator applicant, back-up German singer, and cranky moviegoer in Blazing Saddles (1974)
- Mel Brooks as Moses, Comicus, Torquemada, Jacques, and King Louis XVI in History of the World: Part I (1981)
- Mel Brooks as President Skroob and Yogurt in Spaceballs (1987)
- Joe E. Brown as "Whiskers" (Charles Augustus Holt) and "Brute" Hanson in So You Won't Talk (1940)
- Rob Brydon as Morris Campbell and Prime Minister in MirrorMask (2005)
- Rob Brydon as Captain Toby Shandy and himself in A Cock and Bull Story (2005)
- Yul Brynner as Dan Slater and Kalmar in The Double Man (1967)
- Jessie Buckley as Ida "The Bride" and Mary Shelley in The Bride! (2026)
- Geneviève Bujold as Elizabeth Courtland and Sandra Portinari in Obsession (1976)
- Peter Bull as Caspar Femm and Jasper Femm in The Old Dark House (1963)
- Vlasta Burian as Cyril Pondělíček and Alois Kanibal in The Lovers of an Old Criminal (1927)
- Vlasta Burian as František Lelíček and King Fernando XXIII in Lelíček in the Services of Sherlock Holmes (1932)
- Vlasta Burian as Eman Vovísek and Uncle Jonathan in Nezlobte dědečka (1934)
- Vlasta Burian as Vincenc Babočka, Leon Weber and Prince Narishkin in Tři vejce do skla (1937)
- George Burns as God and Harry O. Tophet (Satan) in Oh, God! You Devil (1984)
- Mike Burstyn as Max and Kuni Leml in The Flying Matchmaker (1966)
- Mike Burstyn as Kuni Leml, Muni Leml and Kuni Leml's Grandfather in Kuni Leml in Tel Aviv (1976)
- Mike Burstyn as Kuni Leml and Muni Leml in Kuni Leml in Cairo (1983)
- Francis X. Bushman as John Conscience and John Power in Man and His Soul (1916)
- Francis X. Bushman as William Poatter and James Houston in The Voice of Conscience (1917)

== C ==
- James Caan as Jack Glenn and Jason Glenn (father and son) in Les Uns et les Autres (1981)
- Nicolas Cage as Sean Archer and Castor Troy in Face/Off (1997)
- Nicolas Cage as Charlie and Donald Kaufman in Adaptation (2002)
- Lacey Camp as Mrs. Fraser and Grace Miller in Fear Street Part Three: 1666 (2021)
- Bruce Campbell as Ash Williams and Evil Ash in Army of Darkness (1992)
- Bruce Campbell as Elvis Presley and Sebastian Haff in Bubba Ho-Tep (2002)
- John Candy as Dennis Valkenheiser and Eldona in Nothing But Trouble (1991)
- Eddie Cantor as himself and Joe Simpson in Thank Your Lucky Stars (1943)
- Joe Carmichael as Milton and Lomax in The Highest Stakes (2026)
- David Carradine as the blind man, monkeyman, Death, and Changsha in Circle of Iron (1978)
- Jim Carrey as Dr. Ivo Robotnik and Gerald Robotnik in Sonic the Hedgehog 3 (2024)
- Silas Carson as Nute Gunray, Ki-Adi-Mundi, Lott Dod, and an ill-fated pilot in Star Wars: Episode I – The Phantom Menace (1999)
- Silas Carson as Nute Gunray and Ki-Adi-Mundi in Star Wars: Episode II – Attack of the Clones (2002)
- Silas Carson as Nute Gunray and Ki-Adi-Mundi in Star Wars: Episode III – Revenge of the Sith (2005)
- Raffey Cassidy as Zsófia and her young adult daughter in The Brutalist (2024)
- Cedric the Entertainer as Nate Johnson and Uncle Earl in Johnson Family Vacation (2004)
- Adriano Celentano as Herman and Gustav in Loggerheads (1978)
- Adriano Celentano as Asso, unnamed card ace, and God in Asso (1981)
- Petr Čepek as Archduke Franz Ferdinand and his double Nývlt in Jára Cimrman Lying, Sleeping (1983)
- Amar Chadha-Patel as Omni, Sek-on, and Sergeant Bui in The Creator (2023)
- Mithun Chakraborty as Rajesh and Ritesh in Taxi Chor (1980)
- Mithun Chakraborty as Ram and Raj in Main Aur Mera Haathi (1981)
- Mithun Chakraborty as Gopi and Johnny in Amne Samne (1982)
- Mithun Chakraborty as Chandan and Kundan in Rakta Bandhan (1984)
- Mithun Chakraborty as Satish Kumar and Avinash (father and son) in Kasam Paida Karnewale Ki (1984)
- Mithun Chakraborty as Ravi and Vijay in Param Dharam (1987)
- Mithun Chakraborty as Johnny and himself in Jeete Hain Shaan Se (1988)
- Mithun Chakraborty as Dindayal Sharma and Shera in Ladaai (1989)
- Mithun Chakraborty as Baldev Raj and Suraj Sharma in Gunahon Ka Devta (1990)
- Mithun Chakraborty as Ashwini and Deva in Paap Ki Kamaee (1990)
- Mithun Chakraborty as Vijay Kumar and Suraj in Swarg Yahan Narak Yahan (1991)
- Mithun Chakraborty as Shiva and Shankar in Pardesi (1993)
- Mithun Chakraborty as Madhav Acharya and Gopal in Paramaatma (1994)
- Mithun Chakraborty as Vijay Bahadur "Amavas" Kunwar and Kranti Kumar (father & son) in Jallad (1995)
- Mithun Chakraborty as Jagadish and Alfred in Bhagya Debata (1995)
- Mithun Chakraborty as Kundan, Kanhaiya and Banarsi in Rangbaaz (1996)
- Mithun Chakraborty as Advocate Mahendra and Surya in Hatyara (1998)
- Mithun Chakraborty as Heeralal and himself in Heeralal Pannalal (1999)
- Mithun Chakraborty as Ravi Verma and Kalishankar in Qaidi (2002)
- Mithun Chakraborty as Gautam and Govinda in Gautam Govinda (2002)
- Mithun Chakraborty as Rudra Sen and Guru in Mahaguru (2007)
- Richard Chamberlain as Louis XIV and Phillipe in The Man in the Iron Mask (1977)
- Jackie Chan as Ma Yau (John Ma) and Bok Min (Boomer) in Twin Dragons (1992)
- Lon Chaney as the fisherman and Hunchback Fate in Alas and Alack (1915)
- Lon Chaney as Henry Norton and Porter Brixton in The Flashlight (1917)
- Lon Chaney as Blind Pew and Merry in Treasure Island (1920)
- Lon Chaney as Black Mike Sylva and Ah Wing in Outside the Law (1920)
- Lon Chaney as Dr. Arthur Lamb and the ape man in A Blind Bargain (1922)
- Lon Chaney as Professor Echo and Mrs O'Grady in The Unholy Three (1925)
- Lon Chaney as Grandfather Wu and his grandson Mr. Wu in Mr. Wu (1927)
- Lon Chaney as Professor Echo and Mrs O'Grady in The Unholy Three (1930)
- Charlie Chaplin as Tramp and Husband in The Idle Class (1921)
- Charlie Chaplin as Adenoid Hynkel and a Jewish barber in The Great Dictator (1940)
- Geraldine Chaplin as Elena and Ana in Peppermint Frappé (1967)
- Geraldine Chaplin as Sarah Glenn and her mother Suzanne in Les Uns et les Autres (1981)
- Syd Chaplin as The Sergeant and Kaiser Wilhelm II in Shoulder Arms (1918)
- Syd Chaplin as Charlie's friend and lunch cart owner in Pay Day (1922)
- Syd Chaplin as eloper, train conductor, and little boy's father in The Pilgrim (1923)
- Edward Chapman as Pippa Passworthy and Raymond Passworthy in Things to Come (1936)
- Graham Chapman as King Arthur, hiccoughing guard, and middle head of three-headed knight in Monty Python and the Holy Grail (1975)
- Graham Chapman as Brian, Biggus Dickus, and wise man #2 in Monty Python's Life of Brian (1979)
- Dave Chappelle as Thurgood and Sir Smoka Lot in Half Baked (1998)
- Ram Charan as Ram Nandan and Appanna (Ram's father) in Game Changer (2025)
- Ram Charan as Charan (Cherry) and Siddharth Nandan (Naayak) in Naayak (2013)
- Prosenjit Chatterjee as Ram and Keshto in Prem Bandhan (1986)
- Prosenjit Chatterjee as Kumar and Shankar in Pratarak (2002)
- Prosenjit Chatterjee as Hari and Arjun (twin brothers) in Rakhe Hari Mare Ke (2003)
- Prosenjit Chatterjee as Funtoosh and Palash in Mr. Funtoosh (2008)
- Prosenjit Chatterjee as Arjun and Akash in Aparadhi (2009)
- Prosenjit Chatterjee as Bikram Singha and Gupi in Bikram Singha: The Lion Is Back (2012)
- Prosenjit Chatterjee as Hensman Anthony and Kushal Hazra in Jaatishwar (2014)
- Prosenjit Chatterjee as Nirmal Mondal and himself in Aay Khuku Aay (2022)
- Soumitra Chatterjee as Tapas Roy and Gobordhan Bhattacharya in Padma Golap (1970)
- Soumitra Chatterjee as Arunabha Mukherjee, Shankar Narayan and Rudra Narayan in Sudur Niharika (1976)
- Hong Chau as Sarah, Sharon, and Aka in Kinds of Kindness (2024)
- Maurice Chevalier as Eugene Charlier and Baron Fernand Cassini in Folies Bergère de Paris (1935)
- Chiranjeevi as Prasad and Shyam in Nakili Manishi (1980)
- Chiranjeevi as Billa and Inspector Vishnu in Billa Ranga (1982)
- Chiranjeevi as Sivudu and Vijay in Sivudu Sivudu Sivudu (1983)
- Chiranjeevi as Srikanth and Sikinder in Roshagadu (1983)
- Chiranjeevi as Raja Sekharam and Vijay in Simhapuri Simham (1983)
- Chiranjeevi as Kalidas and Raja and Ravi in Goonda (1984)
- Chiranjeevi as Raju and Yuvaraju in Jwala (1985)
- Chiranjeevi as Gopi and Gandragoddali in Rakta Sindhuram (1985)
- Chiranjeevi as Raviteja and Nagaraju in Donga Mogudu (1987)
- Chiranjeevi as Chakravarthy and Anji in Chakravarthy (1987)
- Chiranjeevi as Kali and Balu in Yamudiki Mogudu (1988)
- Chiranjeevi as Auto Johnny and Kalyan in Rowdy Alludu (1991)
- Chiranjeevi as Prudhvi, Vikram and Dattatreya in Mugguru Monagallu (1994)
- Chiranjeevi as Raju and Dharma Nayudu in Rikshavodu (1995)
- Chiranjeevi as Simhadri and Chinnayya in Sneham Kosam (1999)
- Chiranjeevi as Govindarajulu and Siddharth in Andarivaadu (2005)
- Chiranjeevi as Kaththi Seenu and Konidela Sivasankara Varaprasad in Khaidi No. 150 (2017)
- Tommy Chong as Chong and Prince Habib in Things Are Tough All Over (1982)
- Priyanka Chopra as Sana Bedi and Zaisha in Love Story 2050 (2008)
- Priyanka Chopra as Anjali, Vishakha, Kajal, Hansa, Mallika, Pooja, Rajni, Nandini, Bhavna, Jhankhana, Sanjana, and Chandrika in What's Your Raashee? (2009)
- Priyanka Chopra as Rukhsar, Radha, and Aradhana in Teri Meri Kahaani (2012)
- Stephen Chow as Jing Koo and his mother, Man-yuk in Tricky Brains (1991)
- Julie Christie as Mildred Montag and Clarisse McClellan in Fahrenheit 451 (1966)
- Christian Clavier as Jacquouille la Fripouille and Jacques-Henri Jacquard in Les Visiteurs (1993)
- Christian Clavier as Jacquouille la Fripouille, Jacques-Henri Jacquard, Prosper and Jacqouillet in The Visitors II: The Corridors of Time (1998)
- Stacy Clausen as Ryan Whelan and his supernatural doppelgänger in Leviticus (2026)
- Andrew Dice Clay as Utah and Elmo in One Night at McCool's (2001)
- John Cleese as Sir Lancelot the Brave, the black knight, Tim the Enchanter, second swallow-savvy guard, peasant #3 and taunting French guard in Monty Python and the Holy Grail (1975)
- John Cleese as Reg, wise man #1, a Jewish official, a centurion, Deadly Dirk, and Arthur in Monty Python's Life of Brian (1979)
- Carol Cleveland as Zoot and Dingo in Monty Python and the Holy Grail (1975)
- George M. Cohan as Theodore K. Blair and Peeter J. 'Doc' Varney in The Phantom President (1932)
- Steve Coit as Private Fletcher and the captain in Fear and Desire (1952)
- Lily Cole as Valentina and her mother in The Imaginarium of Doctor Parnassus (2009)
- Ronald Colman as Sir John Chilcote and John Loder in The Masquerader (1933)
- Ronald Colman as Rudolf Rassendyll and King Rudolf V in The Prisoner of Zenda (1937)
- Jodie Comer as Millie Rusk and MolotovGirl in Free Guy (2021)
- Kevin Conway as the freak show barker, the strip show barker, and Conrad Straker in The Funhouse (1981)
- Christian Convery as young Hal Shelburn and young Bill Shelburn in The Monkey (2025)
- Steve Coogan Tristram Shandy, Walter Shandy, and himself in A Cock and Bull Story (2005)
- Bradley Cooper as Dwight Sage and himself in Brother's Justice (2010)
- Dominic Cooper as Uday Hussein and Latif Yahia in The Devil's Double (2011)
- David Corenswet as Superman and Ultraman in Superman (2025)
- Valentina Cortese as Queen Ariadne and Violet in The Adventures of Baron Munchausen (1988)
- Dolores Costello as Marie and Miriam in Noah's Ark (1928)
- Marion Cotillard as Marie and Lucie in Pretty Things (2001)
- Patrick Cranshaw as Pappy and Pippy in Bubble Boy (2001)
- Barry Crocker as Barry and Kevin McKenzie in Barry McKenzie Holds His Own (1974)
- Harry Crocker as Rex (a tightrope walker), a disgruntled property man, and a clown in The Circus (1928)
- Bing Crosby as Duke Johnson and Junior Hooto in Road to Utopia (1946)
- Benedict Cumberbatch as Dr. Stephen Strange, Sinister Strange, as well as his Earth-617 and Earth-838 variants in Doctor Strange in the Multiverse of Madness (2022)
- Benedict Cumberbatch as Henry Sugar, Max Engleman, and Harry Pope in The Wonderful Story of Henry Sugar and Three More (2024)
- Madison Curry as Young Adelaide Wilson and Young Red in Us (2019)
- Tony Curtis as Casanova and Giacomo in Casanova & Co. (1977)

== D ==
- Willem Dafoe as Raymond, George, and Omi in Kinds of Kindness (2024)
- Paul Dano as Paul Sunday and Eli Sunday in There Will Be Blood (2007)
- James D'Arcy as Rufus Sixsmith, Nurse James, and Archivist Park in Cloud Atlas (2012)
- Amyra Dastur as Madhumitha, Samudra, Kalyani and Shenbagavalli in Anegan (2015)
- Jacob Davich as Linus and Minus in The Adventures of Sharkboy and Lavagirl (2005)
- Keith David as Kupaka, Joe Napier, An-kor Apis, and Prescient in Cloud Atlas (2012)
- Embeth Davidtz as Amanda Martin and Portia Charney in Bicentennial Man (1999)
- Bette Davis as Kate Bosworth and Patricia Bosworth in A Stolen Life (1946)
- Bette Davis as Margaret DeLorca and Edith Phillips in Dead Ringer (1964)
- Judy Davis as Joan Lee and Joan Frost in Naked Lunch (1991)
- Kristin Davis as Max's mom and a Cookie Giant in The Adventures of Sharkboy and Lavagirl (2005)
- Matthew Davis as Travis and Trevor Stark in Urban Legends: Final Cut (2000)
- Warwick Davis as Professor Filius Flitwick and Goblin Bank Teller in Harry Potter and the Philosopher's Stone (2001)
- Warwick Davis as Professor Filius Flitwick and Griphook in Harry Potter and the Deathly Hallows – Part 2 (2011)
- Charlie Day as Sir Tom Bingsley and Latte Pronto in Fool's Paradise (2023)
- Dipankar De as Chhakari, Nakari and Teenkari Dutta in Banchharamer Bagaan (1980)
- Yvonne De Carlo as Rosa Melo and Tonya Melo in Passion (1954)
- Olivia de Havilland as twins Terry and Ruth Collins in The Dark Mirror (1946)
- Robert De Niro as Vito Genovese and Frank Costello in The Alto Knights (2025)
- Cliff De Young as Brad Majors and Farley Flavors in Shock Treatment (1981)
- Erin Dean as Harriet Anderson and Mandy Anderson in Lovers Lane (1999)
- Lana Del Rey as Eve and Mary in Tropico (2013)
- Dolores del Río as María Méndez and Magdalena Méndez in La Otra (1946)
- Alain Delon as Julien de Saint Preux and Guillaume de Saint Preux in The Black Tulip (1964)
- Alain Delon as William Wilson and his doppelgänger in Spirits of the Dead (1968)
- Louis Dempsey as Haskell Moore's dinner guest 3 and Jarvis Hoggins in Cloud Atlas (2012)
- Winston Dennis as Bill and Albrecht in The Adventures of Baron Munchausen (1988)
- Johnny Depp as Tarrant Hightopp and the Mad Hatter in Alice in Wonderland (2010) and Alice Through the Looking Glass (2016)
- Eugenio Derbez as Felipe and Felipe's grandmother in Jack and Jill (2011)
- Dev as Rudra Pratap and Abir in Yoddha: The Warrior (2014)
- Dev as Shyam Mahato and Madhu in Khadaan (2024)
- Aishwarya Devan as Meera and Mallika in Anegan (2015)
- Deven Verma as Bahadur and Bahadur in Angoor (1982)
- Dhanush as Ashwin, Murugappa, Ilamaran, and Kaali in Anegan (2015)
- Dhanush as Kodi and Anbu in Kodi (2016)
- Dhanush as Shakthi and Thiraviyaperumal in Pattas (2020)
- Dhanush as Kathir and Prabhu in Naane Varuvean (2022)
- Dharmendra as Ajit and Manjit in Double Di Trouble (2014)
- Varun Dhawan as Raja and Prem Malhotra in Judwaa 2 (2017)
- Leonardo DiCaprio as King Louis XIV and Philippe in The Man in the Iron Mask (1998)
- Beach Dickerson as Fair-Haired Boy, Man from Burning Plains, Tom Tom Player, and Bear in Teenage Caveman (1958)
- Fritz Diez as Otto Hahn and Adolf Hitler in Take Aim (1974)
- Matt Dillon as a mechanic and Walter Geronimo in Asteroid City (2023)
- Anna Diop as Rayne Thomas and her doppelgänger Eartha in Us (2019)
- Divine as Dawn Davenport and Earl Peterson in Female Trouble (1974)
- Divine as Edna Turnblad and Arvin Hodgepile in Hairspray (1988)
- Madhuri Dixit as Gaja Gamini, Sangeeta, Shakuntala, Monika and Monalisa in Gaja Gamini (2000)
- Martin Docherty as Haskell Moore's dinner guest 4 and Eddie Hoggins in Cloud Atlas (2012)
- Jon Donahue as Haskell Moore's accountant and Sir Felix Finch's friend in Cloud Atlas (2012)
- Robert Donat as Donald Glourie and Murdoch Glourie in The Ghost Goes West (1935)
- Vincent D'Onofrio as Jerry Ashton and Jason Whitney in The Thirteenth Floor (1999)
- Natalie Dormer as Sara and Jess Price in The Forest (2016)
- Kirk Douglas as Harrison and Spur in The Man from Snowy River (1982)
- Richard Dreyfuss as Jack Noah and Alphonse Simms in Moon Over Parador (1988)
- Wheeler Dryden as Thereza's doctor and old ballet dancer in Limelight (1952)
- Sky du Mont as William the Last and Santa Maria in Traumschiff Surprise – Periode 1 (2004)
- Hilary Duff as Lizzie McGuire and Isabella Parigi in The Lizzie McGuire Movie (2003)
- Winston Duke as Gabe Wilson and his doppelgänger Abraham in Us (2019)
- Lindsay Duncan as Lady Bertram and Mrs. Price in Mansfield Park (1999)
- Alexander Dyachenko as Konstantin Gromov and Dmitry Gromov in Brother 2 (2000)
- Adolf Dymsza as passenger of sleeping-car, taxi driver, speaker, waiter, clerk, shop-assistant, "bikiniarz" (beatnik) and boxer in A Matter to Settle (1953)

== E ==
- Jesse Eisenberg as Simon James and James Simon in The Double (2013)
- Hannelore Elsner as Marlit Berlinger and Maria Hereth in Berlinger (1975)
- Heinz Erhardt as Eduard Bollmann, Otto Bollmann and Heinz Bollmann in Triplets on Board (1959)
- Mehmet Ali Erbil as Captain Kartal and Zaldabar in Turks in Space (2006)
- Claes Eriksson as Gerhard Vilen and Jerry Kopp in Stinsen brinner ...filmen alltså (1991)
- Mal Evans as Magician #5 (Magician Standing in the Corner) and a bus passenger in Magical Mystery Tour (1967)

== F ==
- Bill Fagerbakke as Harold the mummy and Ted in Under Wraps (1997)
- Douglas Fairbanks as Joe and Texan soldier in Martyrs of the Alamo (1915)
- Douglas Fairbanks as Florian Amidon and Eugene Brassfield in Double Trouble (1915)
- Douglas Fairbanks as Coke Ennyday and himself in The Mystery of the Leaping Fish (1916)
- Douglas Fairbanks as Ned Thacker and D'Artagnan in A Modern Musketeer (1917)
- Douglas Fairbanks as Richard Marshall III, IV, and V in The Mollycoddle (1920)
- Douglas Fairbanks as Don Cesar de Vega and Zorro in Don Q, Son of Zorro (1925)
- Douglas Fairbanks Jr. as twins Mario and Lucien Franchi in The Corsican Brothers (1941)
- Elle Fanning as Thia and Tessa in Predator: Badlands (2025)
- Frances Farmer as Lotta Morgan and Lotta Bostrom in Come and Get It (1936)
- Simon Farnaby as Earl of Croydon, Juan Domingo, Sausage, Dmitri Alexandrovitch and Fur Seller in Bill (2015)
- William Farnum as King Arthur and inventor in A Connecticut Yankee (1931)
- Michael Fassbender as David and Walter in Alien: Covenant (2017)
- William Faversham as Victor Jones and Earl of Rochester in The Man Who Lost Himself (1920)
- Oded Fehr as clones of Carlos in Resident Evil: Retribution (2012)
- Fernandel as Édouard Saint-Forget and his five sons Alain, Bernard, Charles, Désiré, and Étienne in The Sheep Has Five Legs (1954)
- Cristo Fernández as Juan and Pablo in Sonic the Hedgehog 3 (2024)
- Jacqueline Fernandez as Ayesha and Tia in Roy (2015)
- José Ferrer as Henri de Toulouse-Lautrec and Comte Alphonse de Toulouse-Lautrec in Moulin Rouge (1952)
- Sally Field as Forrest Gump's mother and a reporter who asks him a question while running in Forrest Gump (1994)
- Ralph Fiennes as Ignatz Sonnenschein, Adam Sors, and Ivan Sors in Sunshine (1999)
- Ralph Fiennes as Roald Dahl, a policeman, and a ratcatcher in The Wonderful Story of Henry Sugar and Three More (2024)
- Mikhail Filippov as Vasya and his father Vasily Ilyich Prokhorov in Promised Heaven (1992)
- Larry Fine as himself and Larry's son in Creeps (1956)
- Crista Flanagan as Oracle, Ugly Betty and a Spartan woman in Meet the Spartans (2008)
- Crista Flanagan as Juney and Hannah Montana in Disaster Movie (2008)
- Walt Flanagan as woolen-cap smoker, egg man, offended customer, and cat-admiring bitter customer in Clerks (1994)
- Benjamin Flores Jr. as Josh Johnson and Henry Fier in Fear Street Part Three: 1666 (2021)
- Jeremy Ford as Peter and Caleb in Fear Street Part Three: 1666 (2021)
- Michael J. Fox as Marty McFly, Marty McFly Jr., and Marlene McFly in Back to the Future Part II (1989)
- Michael J. Fox as Marty McFly and Seamus McFly in Back to the Future Part III (1990)
- Brendan Fraser as Bill and Hugh Winterbourne (twins) in Mrs. Winterbourne (1996)
- Brendan Fraser as Elliot Richards and Abraham Lincoln in Bedazzled (2000)
- Brendan Fraser as DJ Drake and himself in Looney Tunes: Back In Action (2003)
- Alan Frazier as Alan and his doppelgänger Jeremiah in Us (2019)
- Pauline Frederick as Mrs. Sherwood and Marion Roche in One Week of Life (1919)
- Rupert Friend as Montana and Asquith Eden in Asteroid City (2023)
- Rupert Friend as Peter Watson/Narrator and Claud in The Wonderful Story of Henry Sugar and Three More (2024)
- Willy Fritsch as Tsar Alexander I of Russia and Uralsky in Der Kongreß tanzt (1931)
- Willy Fritsch as Jupiter and Amphitryon in Amphitryon (1935)
- Willy Fritsch as Dr. Wolfgang A. Wagenbichler and his twin Charly in 12 Hearts For Charly (1949)
- Per Fritzell as Stellan Larsson, Teddy, Bror, Angelo, Torgny and Jack in Stinsen brinner ...filmen alltså (1991)
- Stephen Fry as Archbishop Melchett, Lord Melchett, General Flavius Melchius, and Arthur Wellesley, 1st Duke of Wellington in Blackadder: Back & Forth (1999)
- Stephen Fry as Parson Yorick, Patrick Curator, and himself in A Cock and Bull Story (2005)
- Niall Greig Fulton as Haskell Moore's dinner guest 2 and Mozza Hoggins in Cloud Atlas (2012)
- Robert Fyfe as Old Salty Dog, Mr. Meeks, and Prescient in Cloud Atlas (2012)

== G ==
- Sarah Gadon as Mirena and Mina Murray in Dracula Untold (2014)
- Jim Gaffigan as Cameron Edwin and Kent Armstrong in Linoleum (2022)
- Vladimir Gajdarov as Louis XIV and the Man in the Iron Mask in The Man in the Iron Mask (1923)
- Vice Ganda as Girlie, Peter, Mark, and Panying in Girl, Boy, Bakla, Tomboy (2013)
- Sivaji Ganesan as Vidyapathy and Narada in Saraswati Sabatham (1966)
- Sivaji Ganesan as King, Sekkizhar, Tiru Kurippu Thonda Nayanar, Sundaramoorthy Nayanar, Appar Thirunavukarasar in Thiruvarutchelvar (1967)
- Sivaji Ganesan as Periyalvar, Thirumangai Alwar, Thondaradi podi Alwar (Vibranarayanar) in Thirumal Perumai (1968)
- Sivaji Ganesan as Sedhupathy and Boopathy in Enga Oor Raja (1968)
- Sivaji Ganesan as Sankar, Kannan, and Vijay in Deiva Magan (1969)
- Sivaji Ganesan as Ashok and Anand in Sivagamiyin Selvan (1974)
- Sivaji Ganesan as Kumaraiya and Sundaram in Manidhanum Dheivamagalam (1975)
- Sivaji Ganesan as Sekar and Sundaramoorthy in Ennai Pol Oruvan (1978)
- Sivaji Ganesan as Maanikam and Raju in Punniya Boomi (1978)
- Sivaji Ganesan as Rajashekharan, CID Officer Shankar, and Guru in Thirisoolam (1979)
- Sivaji Ganesan as DSP Saravanan Sivaraj and Sangili in Sangili (1982)
- Sivaji Ganesan as Ramanathan and Raja in Sandhippu (1983)
- Sivaji Ganesan as Father James and S. P. Arul in Vellai Roja (1983)
- Sivaji Ganesan as Parthiban and Vikraman in Uthama Puthiran (1958)
- Sivaji Ganesan as Shankar and Ganesh in Annaiyin Aanai (1958)
- Sivaji Ganesan as Pandiya, Marudhu, and Shankar in Bale Pandiya (1962)
- Sivaji Ganesan as the widower, the drunkard, the doctor, the gunman, the villager, the actor, the leper, the commissioner and the bridegroom in Navarathri (1964)
- Andy García as Ruben Partida Martinez and his brother Robert Martin in Steal Big Steal Little (1995)
- Karen Gillan as Sarah and her clone in Dual (2022)
- Terry Gilliam as Patsy, green knight, singing Camelot knight #3, gorilla hand, old man in scene 24 (soothsaying bridgekeeper), Sir Bors, and the weak-hearted animator (himself) in Monty Python and the Holy Grail (1975)
- Terry Gilliam as another person further forward (at Mount – "Do you hear that? 'Blessed are the Greek'!"), blood and thunder prophet, Geoffrey, Gaoler, and Frank in Monty Python's Life of Brian (1979)
- Uschi Glas as Hanna and Renate in Help, I Love Twins (1969)
- Jackie Gleason as Sheriff Buford T. Justice, Gaylord Justice, and Reginald Van Justice in Smokey and the Bandit II (1980)
- Iain Glen as Dr. Isaacs and his clone in Resident Evil: The Final Chapter (2016)
- John Glover as twins John and James Jekyll in Love! Valour! Compassion! (1997)
- Serdar Gökhan as Dogan Bey and Malkoçoglu Kurtbey in Malkoçoğlu Kurt Bey (1972)
- Rusty Goffe as a Jawa, Kabe, and a Gonk droid in Star Wars (1977)
- Selena Gomez as Grace Bennett and Cordelia Winthrop Scott in Monte Carlo (2011)
- Mia Goth as Maxine Minx and Pearl Douglas in X (2022)
- Mia Goth as Elizabeth Lavenza and Claire Frankenstein in Frankenstein (2025)
- Karel Gott as Lucifer and God in Helluva Good Luck 2 (2001)
- Lon Gowan as Don and his doppelgänger Joseph in Us (2019)
- Mckenna Grace as Maysilee Donner and Merrilee Donner in The Hunger Games: Sunrise on the Reaping (2026)
- Ronny Graham as Oedipus and Jewish prisoner #1 in History of the World, Part I (1981)
- Kerstin Granlund as Maj, Lisbet and Eivor in Macken - Roy's & Roger's Bilservice (1990)
- Kerstin Granlund as Mona Hansson, Rosa Flodquist and Rigmor Assarsson in Stinsen brinner ...filmen alltså (1991)
- Stewart Granger as Rudolf Rassendyl and King Rudolf V in The Prisoner of Zenda (1952)
- Hugh Grant as Rev. Giles Horrox, Hotel Heavy, Lloyd Hooks, Denholme Cavendish, Seer Rhee, and Kona Chief in Cloud Atlas (2012)
- Lawrence Grant as Kaiser Wilhelm II and his double Robert Graubel in To Hell with the Kaiser! (1918)
- Richard Greene as Mario and Carlos in The Bandits of Corsica (1953)
- Bruce Greenwood as Keenan Jones and Pat Garrett in I'm Not There (2007)
- Gippy Grewal as Fateh and Ekam in Double Di Trouble (2014)
- Napiera Groves as Dr. Foster and her doppelgänger Amethyst in Us (2019)
- Alec Guinness as Ethelred D'Ascoyne, 8th Duke of Chalfont, Ascoyne D'Ascoyne, Lord Ascoyne D'Ascoyne, Henry D'Ascoyne, Admiral Lord Horatio D'Ascoyne, General Lord Rufus D'Ascoyne, Lady Agatha d'Ascoyne, and Reverend Lord Henry D'Ascoyne in Kind Hearts and Coronets (1949)
- Alec Guinness as John Barratt and Jacques De Gue in The Scapegoat (1959)
- Vladimir Gulyaev as Volodya and Volodya's twin in The Diamond Arm (1968)
- David Gyasi as Autua, Lester Rey, and Duophysite in Cloud Atlas (2012)
- Jake Gyllenhaal as Adam Bell and Anthony St. Claire in Enemy (2013)
- Jake Gyllenhaal as Tony Hastings and Edward Sheffield in Nocturnal Animals (2016)

== H ==
- Hugo Haas as Composer Viktor Honzl and Professor Alfréd Rokos in Life Is a Dog (1933)
- Kamal Haasan as Rangadu and Shekar in Sommokadidi Sokokadidi (1978)
- Kamal Haasan as twins Babu and Rathinam in Sattam En Kaiyil (1978)
- Kamal Haasan as twins Kalyanam and Raman in Kalyanaraman (1979) and its sequel Japanil Kalyanaraman (1985)
- Kamal Haasan as Selvanayagam and Rajan in Kadal Meengal (1981)
- Kamal Haasan as Dharmalingam and Mohan in Sankarlal (1982)
- Kamal Haasan as Ratan Chander and Ajay Saxena in Yeh To Kamaal Ho Gaya (1982)
- Kamal Haasan as Sethupathy and his twin sons Appu and Raja in Apoorva Sagodharargal (1989)
- Kamal Haasan as Michael, Madhana Gopal, Kameshwaran and Subramaniam Raju in Michael Madana Kama Rajan (1990)
- Kamal Haasan as Senapathy and Chandra Bose in Indian (1996)
- Kamal Haasan as Major Vijaykumar and Nandakumar in Aalavandhan (2001)
- Kamal Haasan as Rangarajan Nambi, Govindarajan Rangaswamy, George W. Bush, Christian Fletcher, Shingan Narahazi, Balram Naidu, Krishnaveni Paati, Avatar Singh, Kalifullah Khan Mukhtar, and Vincent Poovaragan in Dasavathaaram (2008)
- Kamal Haasan as Senapathy and Balram in the upcoming Indian 3 (2025)
- Jack Haley as Hickory and the Tin Man in The Wizard of Oz (1939)
- Arsenio Hall as Semmi, extremely ugly girl, Morris, and Reverend Brown in Coming to America (1988) and Coming 2 America (2021)
- Dieter Hallervorden as Bruno Koob and Hans Immer in Non-Stop Trouble with My Double (1984)
- Dieter Hallervorden as Dieter Dödel, Gustav Böllemann, Titus Böllemann, Kongo-Otto Böllemann, Albert Böllemann, Emilio and Florentine in Nonstop Trouble with the Family (1985)
- George Hamilton as Don Diego Vega and Bunny Wigglesworth in Zorro, the Gay Blade (1981)
- Margaret Hamilton as Miss Almira Gulch and the Wicked Witch of the West in The Wizard of Oz (1939)
- Armie Hammer as Cameron and Tyler Winklevoss in The Social Network (2010)
- Raevan Lee Hanan as Little Girl with Orison, Catkin, and Zachry relative 1 in Cloud Atlas (2012)
- Tom Hanks as Dr. Henry Goose, an Edinburgh hotel manager, Isaac Sachs, Dermot Hoggins, an actor portraying Timothy Cavendish, and Zachry Bailey in Cloud Atlas (2012)
- Cedric Hardwicke as Ludwig and Henry Frankenstein in The Ghost of Frankenstein (1942)
- Cedric Hardwicke as Lord Pendragon and King Arthur in A Connecticut Yankee in King Arthur's Court (1949)
- Oliver Hardy as himself and Ollie Jr in Brats (1930)
- Oliver Hardy as himself and Mrs. Laurel in Twice Two (1933)
- Oliver Hardy as himself and Bert Hardy in Our Relations (1936)
- Tom Hardy as Reggie and Ronnie Kray in Legend (2015)
- Kenneth Harp as Lieutenant Corby and the general in Fear and Desire (1952)
- Woody Harrelson as Merritt McKinney and Chase McKinney in Now You See Me 2 (2016)
- Nathan Harrington as Glen and his doppelgänger Jack in Us (2019)
- Cynthia Harris as Mrs. Williamson and the Queen of Hauptmann-Koenig in Mannequin Two: On the Move (1991)
- Ed Harris as Tom Young and Garret Mathis in The Face of Love (2013)
- George Harrison as himself and Magician #3 (Magician Looking Through Telescope) in Magical Mystery Tour (1967)
- Laurence Harvey as Wilhelm Grimm and the cobbler in The Wonderful World of the Brothers Grimm (1962)
- Lilian Harvey as Lilian von Trucks and Yvette in Her Dark Secret (1928)
- Lilian Harvey as Ann Garden and Jackson's niece Molly in Lucky Kids (1936)
- Keeley Hawes as Elizabeth Shandy and herself in A Cock and Bull Story (2005)
- Maya Hawke as June Douglas and Lucretia Shaver in Asteroid City (2023)
- Jack Hawkins as the Prince of Wales and Footpad in The Elusive Pimpernel (1950)
- Kara Hayward as Nancy and her doppelgänger Syd in Us (2019)
- Louis Hayward as Louis XIV and Philippe of Gascony in The Man in the Iron Mask (1939)
- Louis Hayward as Edwin Jekyll and Dr. Jekyll and Mr. Hyde in The Son of Dr. Jekyll (1951)
- Rita Hayworth as Rusty Parker and Maribelle Hicks in Cover Girl (1944)
- Utkal Hazowary as Arun Mohan and Tarun Mohan in Local Kung Fu 2 (2017)
- Ankush Hazra as Raja Chowdhury and Joy Chatterjee in Villain (2018)
- Bella Heathcote as Josette du Pres and Victoria Winters in Dark Shadows (2012)
- Fred Hechinger as Simon Kalivoda and Isaac in Fear Street Part Three: 1666 (2021)
- Pooja Hegde as Rajkumari Mala Rana and Pooja Thakral in Housefull 4 (2019)
- Tim Heidecker as Josh Tyler and his doppelgänger Tex in Us (2019)
- Brigitte Helm as Maria and her robot double in Metropolis (1927)
- Kevin Heffernan as Phil "Landfill" Krundle, Gil "Landfill" Krundle, and random sausage lady in Beerfest (2006)
- Shirley Henderson as Susannah and herself in A Cock and Bull Story (2005)
- Michael Herbig as Abahachi and Winnetouch in Der Schuh des Manitu (2001)
- Michael Herbig as Mr. Spuck, H2O2 and Winnetouch in Traumschiff Surprise – Periode 1 (2004)
- Michael Herbig as Winnetou, Sissi, Lutz, Mr. Spuck, Sigi Solo, King Ludwig, C.L.A.U.S. and Castanet 1 in Bullyparade: The Movie (2017)
- Michael Herbig as Abahachi and Winnetouch in Das Kanu des Manitu (2025)
- Freddie Highmore as Jared and Simon Grace in The Spiderwick Chronicles (2008)
- Terence Hill as Elliot Vance and Bastiano Joao Coimbra de la Coronilla y Azevedo in Double Trouble (1984)
- Arthur Hohl as Albert Woodruff and "Sniffer" Evans in It Is the Law (1924)
- Tom Hollander as Bloggs and David Blacker in Breathe (2017)
- Tom Hollander as George V, Wilhelm II, and Nicholas II in The King's Man (2021)
- Anna Holmes as a scientist and an executive in Cloud Atlas (2012)
- Bob Hope as Peanuts White and Eric Augustine in My Favorite Spy (1951)
- Anthony Hopkins as Abraham Van Helsing, and an Orthodox priest in Bram Stoker's Dracula (1992)
- Geoffrey Horne as Paolo Franchi and Leone Franchi in The Corsican Brothers (1961)
- Edward Everett Horton as Richard "Dickie" Smith and Felix, the Great Zero, in Lonely Wives (1931)
- Edward Everett Horton as Jeremy Dilke and his doppelgänger in The Man in the Mirror (1936)
- Curly Howard as himself and Pop Howard in 3 Dumb Clucks (1937)
- Moe Howard as himself, Moella, the models father, and Moe's baby in Self Made Maids (1950)
- Moe Howard as himself and Moe's son in Creeps (1956)
- Shemp Howard as himself, Shempetta, and Shemp's baby in Self Made Maids (1950)
- Shemp Howard as himself and Pop Howard in Up in Daisy's Penthouse (1953)
- Shemp Howard as himself and Shemp's son in Creeps (1956)
- Martha Howe-Douglas as Anne Hathaway, Molly, Spanish courtier, and body collector in Bill (2015)
- Jim Howick as Christopher Marlowe, Gabriel Montoya, cynical jester, palace doorman, mysterious man, even grubbier thief, and party planner in Bill (2015)
- Stephanie Hsu as Joy Wang and Jobu Tupaki in Everything Everywhere All at Once (2022)
- Vanessa Hudgens as Stacy DeNovo, Margaret Delacourt, and Lady Fiona Pembroke (second and third movies only) in The Princess Switch (2018), The Princess Switch: Switched Again (2020), and The Princess Switch 3: Romancing the Star (2021)
- Kate Hudson as Emma Dinsmore, Ylva, Elsa, Eldora, and Anna in Alex & Emma (2003)
- Barnard Hughes as Dr. Walter Gibbs and Dumont in Tron (1982)
- Lachy Hulme as Immortan Joe and Rizzdale Pell in Furiosa: A Mad Max Saga (2024)
- Barry Humphries as Aunt Edna, Hoot, and Meyer de Lamphrey in The Adventures of Barry McKenzie (1972)
- Barry Humphries as Senator Douglas Manton, Edna Everage, Meyer de Lamphrey, and buck-toothed Englishman in Barry McKenzie Holds His Own (1974)
- Barry Humphries as Sir Les Patterson and Dame Edna Everage in Les Patterson Saves the World (1987)
- Barry Humphries as Bert, Lady Shopper, and Manager in Pterodactyl Woman from Beverly Hills (1995)
- Barry Humphries as Charlie and Dame Edna Everage in Absolutely Fabulous: The Movie (2016)
- Brandon Hurst as Merlin and doctor in mansion in A Connecticut Yankee (1931)
- John Hurt as Adam Sutler and two Fake Sutler actors in V for Vendetta (2005)
- Toby Huss as Jerry, Alejandro, beach jock #3, Jerry Turner, and Lance in Bedazzled (2000)
- Jonathan Hyde as Sam Parrish and Van Pelt in Jumanji (1995)

== I ==
- Eric Idle as Sir Robin the Not-Quite-So-Brave-as-Sir Launcelot, the corpse collector, Roger the shrubber, peasant #1, the first swamp castle guard, Concorde, and Brother Maynard in Monty Python and the Holy Grail (1975)
- Eric Idle as Mr Cheeky, Loretta, Harry the Haggler, culprit woman who casts first stone, intensely dull youth, Otto, gaoler's assistant, and Mr Frisbee III in Monty Python's Life of Brian (1979)
- Eric Idle as Berthold and Desmond in The Adventures of Baron Munchausen (1988)
- Im Yoon-ah as Kim Yoon Hee and Jung Ha Na in Love Rain (2012)
- Pedro Infante as Juan De Dios Andrade, Lorenzo Andrade, and Victor Andrade in Los Tres Huastecos (1948)
- Rex Ingram as De Lawd, Adam and Hezdrel in The Green Pastures (1936)
- Rex Ingram as Lucius and Lucifer Jr. in Cabin in the Sky (1943)
- Jeremy Irons as Charles Henry Smithson and Mike in The French Lieutenant's Woman (1981)
- Jeremy Irons as Beverly and Elliot Mantle in Dead Ringers (1988)
- Jason Isaacs as Mr. Darling and Captain Hook in Peter Pan (2003)
- Shima Iwashita as Koharu and Osan in Double Suicide (1969)

== J ==
- Hugh Jackman as Robert Angier/Lord Caldlow (The Great Danton) and Gerald Root in The Prestige (2006)
- Hugh Jackman as Tomás Creo, Dr. Tommy Creo, and Tom the Space Traveler in The Fountain (2006)
- Hugh Jackman as Wolverine and X-24 in Logan (2017)
- Hugh Jackman as multiple multiversal variants of Logan/Wolverine in Deadpool & Wolverine (2024)
- Jonathan Jackson as Rudy Gatewick and Oliver Gillis in The Prisoner of Zenda, Inc. (1996)
- Peter Jackson as Robert and Derek in Bad Taste (1987)
- Irène Jacob as Weronika and Véronique in The Double Life of Veronique (1991)
- Rusty Jacobs as Max Bercovicz and David Bailey in Once Upon a Time in America (1984)
- Jagan as Jagan and Saamuda in Anegan (2015)
- Theo James as Hal and Bill Shelburn in The Monkey (2025)
- Jang Keun Suk as Seo In Ha and Seo Joon in Love Rain (2012)
- Iva Janžurová as Klára and Viktorie in Morgiana (1972)
- Iva Janžurová as Lišková and Marcelka in Což takhle dát si špenát (1977)
- Vladimír Javorský as Postman, The Devil and God in ROMing (2007)
- Jeet as Surya and Deva in Aamar Maayer Shapath (2003)
- Jeet as Subhankar and Abhijit in Bidhatar Lekha (2007)
- Jeet as Saurendra Prasad and Jayanta in Pitribhumi (2007)
- Jeet as Mahid and Jayed (father & son) in Shesh Theke Shuru (2019)
- Jeet as Samar Sen and an andro-humanoid clone robot Amar in Boomerang (2024)
- Juliana Jendo as Nina and Nineveh in Wardeh Deesheh (1991)
- Scarlett Johansson as Jordan Two Delta and Sarah Jordan in The Island (2005)
- Scarlett Johansson as Midge Campbell and Mercedes Ford in Asteroid City (2023)
- Dakota Johnson as Susie Bannion and Mother Suspiriorum in Suspiria (2018)
- Doug Jones as the Faun and the Pale Man in Pan's Labyrinth (2006)
- Doug Jones as Abe Sapien, the Angel of Death, and Chamberlain in Hellboy II: The Golden Army (2008)
- Jeffrey Jones as Matt Skearns and Peter Van Der Haven in Out on a Limb (1992)
- Orlando Jones as Daniel/Dan/Danny, Esteban, beach jock #1, Lamar Garrett, and Dr. Ngegitigegitibaba in Bedazzled (2000)
- Terry Jones as Sir Bedevere, Dennis's mother, and Prince Herbert in Monty Python and the Holy Grail (1975)
- Terry Jones as Brian Cohen's mother (Mandy), Colin, Simon the holy man, and the saintly passer-by in Monty Python's Life of Brian (1979)
- Michael B. Jordan as Elijah "Smoke" Moore and Elias "Stack" Moore in Sinners (2025), for which he won the Academy Award for Best Actor
- Shahadi Wright Joseph as Zora Wilson and her doppelgänger Umbrae in Us (2019)
- Louis Jouvet as Pierre Froment and Félix Froment in The Heart of a Nation (1943)
- Milla Jovovich as Alice and several clones in Resident Evil: Extinction (2007), Afterlife (2010), & Retribution (2012)
- Milla Jovovich as Alice and Alicia Marcus in Resident Evil: The Final Chapter (2016)

== K ==
- Pawan Kalyan as Arjun Palwai and Michael Velayudham in Teen Maar (2011)
- Karthi as Rathnavel Pandian and "Rocket" Raja in Siruthai (2011)
- Karthi as Kaashmora and Raj Nayak in Kaashmora (2016)
- Karthi as Chandra Bose (Sardar) and Vijay Prakash in Sardar (2022)
- Ranbir Kapoor as Shamshera and his father in Shamshera (2020)
- Shammi Kapoor as Mike and Shekhar in China Town (1962)
- Shashi Kapoor as Kamal and Rakesh in Haseena Maan Jayegi (1968)
- Boris Karloff as Gregor de Bergmann and Anton de Bergmann in The Black Room (1935)
- Ashok Kashyap as Thirupathi and Pazhani in Ambuttu Imbuttu Embuttu (2005)
- Rick Kavanian as Schrotty, Jens Maul and Pulle in Traumschiff Surprise – Periode 1 (2004)
- Rick Kavanian as Jens Kasirske, Pavel Pipovič, Dr. Schmitz, Field marshal, Dimitri, Löffler, Schrotty, King Clone, the Yeti, James Beam, Registrar and Castanet 3 in Bullyparade: The Movie (2004)
- Rick Kavanian as Dimitri and Deputy Ratford in Das Kanu des Manitu (2025)
- Danny Kaye as Edwin Dingle and Buzzy Bellew in Wonder Man (1945)
- Danny Kaye as Jack Martin and Henri Duran in On the Riviera (1951)
- Danny Kaye as Ernie Williams and Lawrence-MacKenzie Smith in On The Double (1961)
- Zoe Kazan as Laurel and Audrey in The Pretty One (2013)
- Buster Keaton as gardener, delivery boy and cop in The Rough House (1917)
- Buster Keaton as sheriff and saloon owner in Out West (1918)
- Buster Keaton played virtually every role, including a stagehand, a dance troupe, a full band and every member in the audience in The Playhouse (1921)
- Buster Keaton as himself and Princess Raja in The Hollywood Revue of 1929 (1929)
- Buster Keaton as Buster Garner and Jim le Balafré in Le roi des Champs-Élysées (1934)
- Michael Keaton as Doug Kinney and his three clones in Multiplicity. (1996)
- Howard Keel as "Stretch" Barnes and "Smoky" Callaway in Callaway Went Thataway (1951)
- Joe Keery as Stephen Malkmus and himself in Pavements (2024)
- Marwan Kenzari as Ishmael Gregor / Sabbac and Ahk-Ton, Ishmael's ancestor, in Black Adam (2022)
- Deborah Kerr as Edith Hunter, Barbara Wynne, and 'Johnny' Cannon in The Life and Death of Colonel Blimp (1943)
- Aamir Khan as Sahir Khan and his twin brother Samar Khan in Dhoom 3 (2013)
- Salman Khan as Raja and Prem Malhotra in Judwaa (1997)
- Salman Khan as Prem Dilwale and Yuvraj Vijay Singh, the namesake Prince of Pritampur in Prem Ratan Dhan Payo (2015)
- Salman Khan as Raja and Prem Malhotra in Judwaa 2 (2017)
- Saif Ali Khan as Jai, Jimmy and Rakesh Rajpal in Aashik Awara (1993)
- Saif Ali Khan as Amar and Prince Vijay in Surakshaa (1995)
- Saif Ali Khan as Ehsaan Khan and Khalid in Kurbaan (2009)
- Saif Ali Khan as Jai Vardhan Singh and Veer Singh Panesar in Love Aaj Kal (2009)
- Saif Ali Khan as Ashok Singhania, Ashok 2 and Dr. Khan's assistant 1 in Humshakals (2014)
- Sara Ali Khan as Rinku Suryavanshi and Manjari Suryavanshi Khan in Atrangi Re (2021)
- Shah Rukh Khan as Arjun Singh and Vijay in Karan Arjun (1995)
- Shah Rukh Khan as Bablu and Manu Dada in Duplicate (1998)
- Shah Rukh Khan as Kishan Laal and Prem the ghost in Paheli (2005)
- Shah Rukh Khan as Don and Vijay in Don (2006)
- Shah Rukh Khan as Om Makhija and Om Kapoor in Om Shanti Om (2007)
- Shah Rukh Khan as Shekhar Subramanium and G.One in Ra.One (2011)
- Shah Rukh Khan as Aryan Khanna and Gaurav Chandna in Fan (2016)
- Shah Rukh Khan as Vikram Rathore and Azad in Jawan (2023)
- Shakib Khan as Roni and Rocky in Jomoj (2007)
- Shakib Khan as Rajonno and Dr. Ricky Ibrahim in Bhalobashar Laal Golap (2009)
- Shakib Khan as Hero and Hira in Hero: The Superstar (2014)
- Shakib Khan as Ajaan and Ujaan in Bhaijaan Elo Re (2018)
- Shakib Khan as Captain Khan and Asif in Captain Khan (2018)
- Shakib Khan as Mass and Indrajit in Naqaab (2018)
- Shakib Khan as Galib Bin Ghani a.k.a. Toofan and Shanto in Toofan (2024)
- Shakib Khan as Mikhail and Swadhin in Taandob (2025)
- Guy Kibbee as radio director and The Chief in The Horn Blows at Midnight (1945)
- Margot Kidder as Danielle Breton and Dominique Blanchion in Sisters (1972)
- Terry Kilburn as John Colley and Peter Colley I, II, and III in Goodbye, Mr. Chips (1939)
- Kim Shi-hoo as Lee Dong-wook and Lee Sun-ho in Love Rain (2012)
- Jaime King as Goldie and Wendy in Sin City (2005)
- Jaime King as Goldie and Wendy in Sin City: A Dame to Kill For (2014)
- Ben Kingsley as Imdad Khan, a dealer, and Dr. Ganderbai in The Wonderful Story of Henry Sugar and Three More (2024)
- Rory Kinnear as Geoffrey, a naked man, a vicar, a pub owner, a police officer, Samuel's face and two pub patrons in Men (2022)
- Klaus Kinski as Dave Emerson and Richard Emerson in Creature with the Blue Hand (1967)
- Terry Kiser as Spretzel and Count Gunther Spretzle in Mannequin Two: On the Move (1991)
- Kevin Kline as Dave Kovic and President Bill Mitchell in Dave (1993)
- Kevin Kline as Vince McCain and Rod McCain in Fierce Creatures (1997)
- Kevin Kline as Artemus Gordon and Ulysses S. Grant in Wild Wild West (1999)
- David Koechner as Senior and himself in Brother's Justice (2010)
- Harvey Korman as Krelman the cantina patron, Chef Gormaanda, and the Amorphian assembly-instructor in The Star Wars Holiday Special (1978)
- Jiří Kostka as Emperor Franz Joseph I and his double Macháně in Jára Cimrman Lying, Sleeping (1983)
- Petr Kostka as Karel and Jan Bureš in Tomorrow I'll Wake Up and Scald Myself with Tea (1977)
- Elias Koteas as Casey Jones and Whit in Teenage Mutant Ninja Turtles III (1993)
- Mahesh Kothare (credited as Master Mahesh) as Yuvraaj Narendradev and Raja in Raja Aur Runk (1968)
- Werner Krauss as no less than five antisemitic stereotypes in Jud Süß (1940)
- Krishna as Gopi and Syam in Takkari Donga Chakkani Chukka (1969)
- Krishna as Gopi and Kishore in Maa Inti Velugu (1972)
- Krishna as Ramachandra Rao and Prakash in Deergha Sumangali (1974)
- Krishna as Ramu and Sreenivas in Abhimanavathi (1975)
- Krishna as Venu and Gopi in Ramarajyamlo Rakthapasam (1976)
- Krishna as Rajasekharam (Vijayaraghava Bhupathi), Kumar and Raja in Kumara Raja (1978)
- Krishna as Ramesh and Gangulu in Chuttalunnaru Jagratha (1980)
- Krishna as Anjaneyulu and Raghava in Bandodu - Gundamma (1980)
- Krishna as Kanwarlal and Vijay in Antham Kaadidi Aarambham (1981)
- Krishna as Madhu, Raju and Prabhakar in Doctor Cine Actor (1982)
- Krishna as Harikrishna (Lion), Mohan Krishna and Muddu Krishna in Pagabattina Simham (1982)
- Krishna as Prathap Kumar and Anandh in Chattaniki Veyi Kallu (1983)
- Krishna as Lion, Sridhar and Anandh in Siripuram Monagadu (1983)
- Krishna as Ramu and Krishna in Sakthi (1983)
- Krishna as Kishan and Krishna Rao in Yuddham (1984)
- Krishna as Chakravarthy, Krishna and Vijay in Raktha Sambandham (1984)
- Krishna as Gopi, Krishna and Raja Ravindra in Bangaru Kapuram (1984)
- Krishna as Ramu and Krishna in Dongalu Baboi Dongalu (1984)
- Krishna as Jamadagni and Chandram in Agni Parvatam (1985)
- Krishna as Ravi and Raja in Andharikante Monagadu (1985)
- Krishna as Sambhu Prasad and Raja in Maha Manishi (1985)
- Krishna as Nagaraju and Krishna in Krishna Garadi (1986)
- Krishna as Vikrama Simha and Aditya Vardhana in Simhasanam (1986)
- Krishna as Krishnamanaidu and Vijay in Sardar Krishnama Naidu (1987)
- Krishna as Vijay and Vikram in Sankharavam (1987)
- Krishna as Suryam and Kranthi Kumar in Agni Keratalu (1988)
- Krishna as Bhavani Prasad and Kishtayya in Atha Mechina Alludu (1989)
- Krishna as Sriharsha and Chandram in Yes Nenante Nene (1994)
- Krishna as Kishore and Ramesh Chandra in Rendu Kutumbala Katha (1996)
- Krishna as Harishchandra Prasad, Sarath Chandra Prasad and Krishna Prasad in Bobbili Dora (1997)
- Krishna as Durga and Guna in Maanavudu Daanavudu (1999)
- Krishna as Krishnamanaidu and Rudramanaidu in Pandanti Samsaram (2001)
- Diane Kruger as Becca, Terry, and Hunny in The Shrouds (2025)
- Meena Kumari as Sahibjaan (Pakeezah) and her mother Nargis in Pakeezah (1972)
- Ajith Kumar as Deva and Shiva in Vaalee (1999)
- Ajith Kumar as Citizen and Subramani in Citizen (2001)
- Ajith Kumar as Shiva and Vishnu in Villain (2002)
- Ajith Kumar as Guru and Jeeva in Attahasam (2004)
- Ajith Kumar as Jeeva, Shivshankar, and Vishnu in Varalaru (2006)
- Ajith Kumar as David Billa and Saravanavelu in Billa (2007)
- Ajith Kumar as Jeevanandham and Shiva in Asal (2010)
- Akshay Kumar as Jai Verma and Kishen Verma in Jai Kishen (1994)
- Akshay Kumar as Inspector Vijay Kumar and Lallu in Sabse Bada Khiladi (1995)
- Akshay Kumar as Rocky / Raja Parimal Chaturvedi in Aflatoon (1997)
- Akshay Kumar as Dev Kumar Malhotra and Anand Kumar Malhotra in Khiladi 420 (2000)
- Akshay Kumar as Jai Puri and Jeet Puri in 8 x 10 Tasveer (2009)
- Akshay Kumar as Shivam "Shiva" Bharadwaj and ASP Vikram Singh Rathore in Rowdy Rathore (2012)
- Akshay Kumar as Bahattar Singh and Tehattar Singh in Khiladi 786 (2012)
- Akshay Kumar as Harry Sinha and Rajkumar Bala Dev Singh in Housefull 4 (2019)
- Dilip Kumar as Ram and Shyam in Ram Aur Shyam (1967)
- Sanjeev Kumar as Sudhir and Vijay in Raja Aur Runk (1968)
- Sanjeev Kumar as twin brothers Ashok Tilak and Ashok Tilak in Angoor (1982)
- Uttam Kumar as Ajay Mitra and Binay Dutta in Tasher Ghar (1957)
- Uttam Kumar as Kalishankar Rai, Gourishankar Rai and Shankar Singh in Jhinder Bondi (1961)
- Uttam Kumar as Capt. Prabir Chatterjee and Havildar Ratneshwar Bhattacharya in Uttarayan (1963)
- Uttam Kumar as Chiranjib and Chiranjit (twin brothers) in Bhranti Bilas (1963)
- Uttam Kumar as Tapas and Rudra in Duti Mon (1970)
- Uttam Kumar as Asish and Pradip in Chhinnapatra (1972)
- Uttam Kumar as Prabir Majumder and Santanu Roy in Kayahiner Kahini (1973)
- Uttam Kumar as Sudhir Roy and Adhir Roy (twin brothers) in Ami, Shey O Shakha (1975)
- Uttam Kumar as Bhola and Uday B. Singh in Bandie (1978)
- Uttam Kumar as Bikram and Bijay in Nishan (1978)

== L ==
- Florence La Badie as Laura Fairlie and Ann Catherick in The Woman in White (1917)
- Bert Lahr as Zeke and the Cowardly Lion in The Wizard of Oz (1939)
- Karel Lamač as Innkeeper Palivec and Lt. Lukáš in The Good Soldier Schweik (1926)
- Elsa Lanchester as Mary Shelley and the monster's mate in Bride of Frankenstein (1935)
- Stan Laurel as himself and Stan Jr in Brats (1930)
- Stan Laurel as himself and Mrs Hardy in Twice Two (1933)
- Stan Laurel as himself and Alf Laurel in Our Relations (1936)
- Hugh Laurie as Major George Bufton-Tufton, Viscount Bufton-Tufton and Consul Georgius in Blackadder: Back & Forth (1999)
- Denis Lavant as Mr. Oscar, the beggar, motion capture actor, Monsieur Merde, Father, the accordionist, the killer, the killed, the dying, and the man in the foyer in Holy Motors (2012)
- Joey Lawrence as Ralph Bitondo and Ricky Prince in Prince for a Day (1995, TV film)
- Marcia Layton as Lisa and Lenore in Cthulhu Mansion (1990)
- Cloris Leachman as Agatha and Sophia in Double, Double, Toil and Trouble (1993)
- Aarif Lee as Law Chun-yat and Law Chun-yi in Echoes of the Rainbow (2010)
- Brody Nicholas Lee as Javier Gomez, Jonas, and Zachry Bailey's older nephew in Cloud Atlas (2012)
- Jason Lee as Dennis Pepper and Steve in A Better Place (1997)
- Jason Lee as Brodie Bruce and Banky Edwards in Jay & Silent Bob Strike Back (2001)
- Jennifer Jason Leigh as Elizabeth Whitecomb and Beth in The Love Letter (1998)
- Valérie Lemercier as Frénégonde de Pouille and Béatrice de Montmirail in Les Visiteurs (1993)
- Jack Lemmon as Professor Fate and Prince Hapnik in The Great Race (1965)
- John Lennon as himself, Magician #1 (Magician with Coffee), Ticket Salesman, The Eggman, Pirandello the Waiter, and The Narrator in Magical Mystery Tour (1967)
- Sunny Leone as Meera and Leela in Ek Paheli Leela (2015)
- Sunny Leone as twins sisters Laila and Lily Lele in Mastizaade (2016)
- Sunny Leone as Celina and Ambar Kapoor in One Night Stand (2016)
- Stephanie Leonidas as Helena Campbell and The Princess in MirrorMask (2005)
- Yevgeny Leonov as Eugene Troshkin and Docent in Gentlemen of Fortune (1971)
- Rolf Leslie as 27 Different Characters in Sixty Years a Queen (1913)
- Mark Lester as Prince Edward and Tom Canty in The Prince and the Pauper (1977)
- Jerry Lewis as Professor Julius Kelp and Buddy Love in The Nutty Professor (1963)
- Jerry Lewis as Willard Woodward, James Peyton, Everett Peyton, Julius Peyton, Captain Eddie Peyton, Skylock Peyton, and 'Bugs' Peyton in The Family Jewels (1965)
- Jerry Lewis as Gerald Clamson and Syd Valentine in The Big Mouth (1967)
- Udo Lindenberg as himself and Carl Coolman in Panic Time (1980)
- Theo Lingen as Dr. Taft and Gotthold Taft in We'll Take Care of the Teachers (1970)
- John Lithgow as Dr. Emilio Lizardo and Lord John Whorfin in The Adventures of Buckaroo Banzai (1984)
- Blake Lively as Emily Nelson/Hope McLanden and Faith McLanden in A Simple Favour (2018)
- Blake Lively as Emily Nelson/Hope McLanden and Charity McLanden in Another Simple Favor (2025)
- Christopher Lloyd as Reggie Shand and Henry Shand in Walk Like a Man (1987)
- Harry Lloyd as Richard III and Pete in The Lost King (2022)
- Gene Lockhart as The Starkeeper and Dr. Selden in Carousel (1956)
- Lindsay Lohan as Hallie Parker and Annie James in The Parent Trap (1998)
- Lindsay Lohan as Aubrey Fleming and Dakota Moss in I Know Who Killed Me (2007)
- Gina Lollobrigida as Sylvia Sorrego and Helena Ricci in Flesh and the Woman (1954)
- George Lopez as Mr. Electricidad and Mr. Electric in The Adventures of Sharkboy and Lavagirl (2005)
- Jennifer Lopez as Ingrid Luna, Aurora, and The Spider Woman in Kiss of the Spider Woman (2025)
- Sophia Loren as Adelina Sbaratti, Anna Molteni, and Mara in Yesterday, Today and Tomorrow (1963)
- Myrna Loy as Morgana Le Fay and evil sister in Mansion in A Connecticut Yankee (1931)
- Tibor Lubinszky as Prince Edward and Tom Canty in The Prince and the Pauper (1920)
- Matt Lucas as Tweedledum and Tweedledee in Alice in Wonderland (2010)
- Matt Lucas as Tweedledum and Tweedledee in Alice Through the Looking Glass (2016)
- Diego Luna as Valentin Arregui and Armando in Kiss of the Spider Woman (2025)
- John Lund as Captain Bart Cosgrove and his son, Lieutenant Gregory Piersen, in To Each His Own (1946)

== M ==
- Fred MacMurray as Eddie York and Francis Pemberton in Pardon My Past (1945)
- Kiana Madeira as Deena Johnson and Sarah Fier in Fear Street Part Three: 1666 (2021)
- R. Madhavan as Sakthi and Kannan in Rendu (2006)
- Madhubala as Banani, Nirmala and Deepak Mahal's owner in Phagun (1958)
- Jonathan Majors as Kang the Conqueror as well as numerous Kang variants within the Council of Kangs including Immortus, Rama-Tut, and Centurion in the mid-credits scene, as well as the variant Victor Timely in the post-credits scene in Ant-Man and the Wasp: Quantumania (2023)
- Hema Malini as Seeta and Geeta in Seeta Aur Geeta (1972)
- Koel Mallick as Meena and Reena in Bandhan (2004)
- Koel Mallick as Rani Arundhati and Mishti in Arundhati (2014)
- Ranjit Mallick as Arun and Tarun in Proxy (1977)
- Ranjit Mallick as Joy and Bijoy in Shathe Shathyang (1982)
- Mammootty as Lawrence and Johny in Parampara (1990)
- Mammootty as Abubacker and Dada Sahib in Dada Sahib (2000)
- Mammootty as Balaram and Taradas in Balram vs. Taradas (2006)
- Mammootty as Appu and Achu in Annan Thambi (2008)
- Mammootty as Rameshan and Swami in Mayabazar (2008)
- Mammootty as Jimmy and Genie in Ee Pattanathil Bhootham (2009)
- Mammootty as Haridas, Ahmed Haji, and Khalid Ahmed (three roles) in Paleri Manikyam (2009)
- Mammootty as Madhavan and Kunhunni in Drona (2010)
- Mammootty as Karunan and Abhilash in Shikari (2012)
- Mammootty as Majeed and Majeed's father in Balyakalasakhi (2014)
- Mammootty as Raja and Shivadas Naidu in Cobra (2012)
- Mammootty as himself and Mathukkutti in Kadal Kadannu Oru Maathukutty (2013)
- Miles Mander as Horace Granville and Harry Crowel in Daredevils of the Red Circle (1939)
- Terrence Mann as Ug and Johnny Steele in Critters (1986)
- Crane Manohar as Pazhani and Pazhani in Ambuttu Imbuttu Embuttu (2005)
- Jean Marais as The Beast and Avenant in Beauty and the Beast (1946)
- Jean Marais as Jérôme Fandor and Fantômas in Fantômas (1964)
- Jean Marais as Jérôme Fandor and Fantômas in Fantômas se déchaîne (1965)
- Jean Marais as Jérôme Fandor and Fantômas in Fantômas contre Scotland Yard (1967)
- Fredric March as Kenneth Wayne and Jeremy Wayne in Smilin' Through (1932)
- Fredric March as Jean Valjean and Champmathieu in Les Misérables (1935)
- Fredric March as Jonathan, Nathaniel, Samuel, and Wallace Wooley in I Married a Witch (1942)
- Jane March as Rose, Richie, and Bonnie in Color of Night (1994)
- Miriam Margolyes as Aunt Sponge and Glowworm in James and the Giant Peach
- Cheech Marin as Cheech and Dwayne 'Red' Mendoza in Cheech & Chong's Next Movie (1980)
- Cheech Marin as Cheech and Mr. Slyman in Things Are Tough All Over (1982)
- Cheech Marin as a border guard, Chet Pussy, and Carlos in From Dusk till Dawn (1996)
- Joan Marshall (credited as Jean Arless) as Emily and Warren in Homicidal (1961)
- Lee Marvin as Tim Strawn and Kid Shelleen in Cat Ballou (1965), for which he received the Academy Award for Best Actor
- Jaroslav Marvan as Borivoj Kohout and Jaroslav Kohout in The Last of the Mohicans (1947)
- Tatiana Maslany as Liz and an 18th-century witch in Keeper (2025)
- Raymond Massey as John Cabal and Oswald Cabal in Things to Come (1936)
- Marcello Mastroianni as Carmine Sbaratti, Renzo, and Augusto Rusconi in Yesterday, Today and Tomorrow (1964)
- Ryuhei Matsuda as Junior Scientist #4 and a bartender in Isle of Dogs (2018)
- Paul McCartney as himself, Magician #2 (Painted Nose Magician), and Major McCartney in Magical Mystery Tour (1967)
- Paul McGann as Girard and Jussac in The Three Musketeers (1993)
- Rose McGowan as Cherry Darling and Pam in Grindhouse (2007)
- Ewan McGregor as Lincoln Six Echo and Tom Lincoln in The Island (2005)
- Ewan McGregor as Jesus and Satan in Last Days in the Desert (2015)
- Tim McInnerny as Archdeacon Darling, le Duc de Darling and the Duke of Darling in Blackadder: Back & Forth (1999)
- Gina McKee as Joanne Campbell, Queen of Shadows, and Queen of Light in MirrorMask (2005)
- Charles McKeown as Rupert and Adolphus in The Adventures of Baron Munchausen (1988)
- Ashley McKoy as Teenage Adelaide Wilson and Teenage Red in Us (2019)
- Josh Meyers as Napoleon Dynamite and Owen Wilson in Date Movie (2006)
- Bette Midler as Sadie Shelton and Sadie Ratliff in Big Business (1988)
- Toshiro Mifune as Prince Yamato Takeru and Susanoo in The Three Treasures (1959)
- Ezra Miller as Barry Allen/The Flash and an alternate younger version of Barry from 2013 who later becomes the Dark Flash in The Flash (2023)
- Hayley Mills as Sharon McKendrick and Susan Evers in The Parent Trap (1961)
- Hayley Mills as Sharon Ferris and Susan Carey in The Parent Trap II (1986)
- Hayley Mills as Sharon McKendrick-Grand and Susan Evers-Wyatt in Parent Trap III (1989)
- Hayley Mills as Sharon McKendrick-Grand and Susan Evers-Wyatt in Parent Trap: Hawaiian Honeymoon (1989)
- Penelope Mitchell as Sloan and Amy in Oh, Canada (2024)
- Matthew Modine as Henry Petosa and Freddy Ace in Equinox (1992)
- Babu Mohan as Ramu and Ramu in Ulta Palta (1998)
- Mohanlal as Jayamohan and Vikraman in Pathamudayam (1985)
- Mohanlal as Shobaraj and Dharmaraj in Shobaraj (1986)
- Mohanlal as Soap Kuttappan and Maathu Pandaaram in Padamudra (1988)
- Mohanlal as Sachidanandan and Balakrishnan Bhagavathar in Naadody (1992)
- Mohanlal as Narendran and Unni in Maya Mayuram (1993)
- Mohanlal as Mangalassery Neelakandan and Mangalassery Karthikeyan in Ravanaprabhu (2001)
- Mohanlal as Shooranad Pappoyi and Shooranad Kunju in Udayon (2005)
- Mohanlal as Dijo John and Joy John in Photographer (2006)
- Mohanlal as Mathukutty; appeared as father and son in China Town (2011)
- Mohanlal as Colonel Mahadevan and Major Sahadevan in 1971: Beyond Borders (2017)
- Mohanlal as Ittymaani and Ittymaathan in Ittymaani: Made in China (2019)
- Gretchen Mol as Natasha Molinaro and Jane Fuller in The Thirteenth Floor (1999)
- Janelle Monáe as Helen and Andi Brand in Glass Onion: A Knives Out Mystery (2022)
- Cinzia Monreale as Anna and Teodora Völkl ('Elenor Völkl' in the English dub) in Beyond the Darkness (1979)
- Julia Montes as Kara Dela Rosa and Sara Suarez in Doble Kara (2015)
- Dylan Moran as Dr Slop and himself in A Cock and Bull Story (2005)
- Cindy Morgan as Lora and Yori in Tron (1982)
- Dennis Morgan as John Keith and Derry Conniston in River's End (1940)
- Frank Morgan as Professor Marvel, the gatekeeper, the carriage driver, the guard, and the Wizard of Oz in The Wizard of Oz (1939)
- Temuera Morrison as Jango Fett and many clone troopers in Star Wars: Episode II – Attack of the Clones (2002)
- Temuera Morrison as Commander Cody, Commander Gree and many other clone troopers in Star Wars: Episode III – Revenge of the Sith (2005)
- Scott Mosier as William Black, Angry Mourner, and Angry Hockey Playing Customer in Clerks (1994)
- Scott Mosier as William Black and Good Will Hunting 2 assistant director in Jay & Silent Bob Strike Back (2001)
- Elisabeth Moss as Kitty Tyler and her doppelgänger Dahlia in Us (2019)
- Masahiro Motoki as Yukio Daitokuji and Sutekichi in Gemini (1999)
- Wagner Moura as Armando/Marcelo and his son Fernando as an adult in The Secret Agent (2025)
- Mary Mouser as Savannah O'Neal and Emma Reynolds in Frenemies (2012)
- Ulrich Mühe as Joseph Goebbels and Harry Geduldig in Goebbels und Geduldig (2001)
- Armin Mueller-Stahl as Grierson, Hannon Fuller, and Jane's father in The Thirteenth Floor (1999)
- Patty Mullen as Judy and Kiki LaRue in Doom Asylum (1988)
- Paul Muni as Papa Chibou and six wax figures in Seven Faces (1929)
- Paul Muni as Eddie Kagle and Judge Frederick Parker in Angel on My Shoulder (1946)
- Eddie Murphy as Akeem, Mr. Clarence, Randy Watson, and Saul in Coming to America (1988) and Coming 2 America (2021)
- Eddie Murphy as Maximillian, Preacher Pauly, and Guido in Vampire in Brooklyn (1995)
- Eddie Murphy as Professor Sherman Klump/Buddy Love, Lance Perkins, Cletus 'Papa' Klump, Anna Pearl 'Mama' Jensen Klump, Ida Mae 'Granny' Jensen, and Ernie Klump Sr. in The Nutty Professor (1996) and Nutty Professor II: The Klumps (2000)
- Eddie Murphy as Kit Ramsey and Jefferson 'Jiff' Ramsey in Bowfinger (1999)
- Eddie Murphy as Pluto Nash and Rex Crater in The Adventures of Pluto Nash (2002)
- Eddie Murphy as Norbit Albert Rice, Rasputia Latimore, and Mr. Hangten Wong in Norbit (2007)
- Eddie Murphy as Dave Ming Cheng and The Captain in Meet Dave (2008)
- Mike Myers as Charlie Mackenzie and Stuart Mackenzie in So I Married an Axe Murderer (1993)
- Mike Myers as Austin Powers and Dr. Evil in Austin Powers: International Man of Mystery (1997)
- Mike Myers as Austin Powers, Dr. Evil, and Fat Bastard in Austin Powers: The Spy Who Shagged Me (1999)
- Mike Myers as Austin Powers, Dr. Evil, Fat Bastard, and Johan "Goldmember" van der Smut in Austin Powers: Goldmember (2002)

== N ==
- Nagarjuna as Deva and Ravi Varma in Hello Brother (1994)
- Nagarjuna as Surya Murthy and Satya in Eduruleni Manishi (2001)
- Nagarjuna as Seetharamudu and Nageswara Rao "Bittu" in Manam (2014)
- Nagarjuna as Bangarraju and Dr. Ram Mohan in Soggade Chinni Nayana (2016)
- Nagarjuna as Bangarraju and Dr. Ram Mohan in Bangarraju (2022)
- Tatsuya Nakadai as Takeda Shingen and the Kagemusha in Kagemusha (1980)
- Miho Nakayama as Itsuki Fujii and Hiroko Watanabe in Love Letter (1995)
- Nani as Arvind and Mahesh in Janda Pai Kapiraju (2015)
- Nani as Gautham and Jai in Gentleman (2016)
- Nani as Krishna and Arjun Jayaprakash in Krishnarjuna Yudham (2018)
- Nani as Shyam Singha Roy and Vasu in Shyam Singha Roy (2021)
- Nayanthara as Apsara Arjun and Maya Mathews in Maya (2015)
- Nayanthara as Bhavani and Yamuna in Airaa (2019)
- Yuriy Nazarov as Prince Yury of Zvenigorod and Grand Duke Vasily I of Moscow in Andrei Rublev (1966)
- Pola Negri as Lea and her mother Lydia in Der Gelbe Schein (1918)
- Sam Neill as Mr. Joe McGregor and Tommy Brock in Peter Rabbit (2018)
- Sam Neill as Mark and his doppelgänger in Possession (1981)
- Barry Nelson as Charles "Chick" Graham and Albert "Bert" Rand in The Man with My Face (1951)
- Duke Nicholson as Danny and his doppelgänger Tony in Us (2019)
- Jack Nicholson as U.S. President James Dale and Art Land in Mars Attacks! (1996)
- Assia Noris as Dora Nelson and Pierina Costa in Dora Nelson (1939)
- Edward Norton as Bill Kincaid and Brady Kincaid in Leaves of Grass (2009)
- Richard Norton as himself, a bodyguard, and a fitness trainer in ABBA: The Movie (1977)
- Alighiero Noschese as Rita Pavone and Noskes in Operation Goldsinger (1965)
- Alighiero Noschese as Don Vito Monreale and Nick Bulione in The Funny Face of the Godfather (1972)
- Kim Novak as Judy Barton and Madeleine Elster in Vertigo (1958)
- Ivor Novello as Michel Angeloff and "the Bosnian murderer" in The Lodger (1932)
- Oldřich Nový as Drummer Emil and Sir Hannibal Morris in The Phantom of Morrisville (1966)
- Lupita Nyong'o as Adelaide Wilson and her doppelgänger Red in Us (2019)
- Lupita Nyong'o as sisters Helen of Troy and Clytemnestra in The Odyssey (2026)

== O ==
- A majority of the cast in O Lucky Man!, a 1973 British comedy-drama, play multiple roles.
- Dylan O'Brien as Roman and Rocky in Twinless (2025)
- George O'Brien as Travis and Japheth in Noah's Ark (1928)
- Brendan O'Carroll as Agnes Brown and Mr. Wang in Mrs. Brown's Boys D'Movie (2014)
- Frances O'Connor as Alison Gardner and Nicole Delarusso in Bedazzled (2000)
- Nick Offerman as Dutch, Joaquin, and Nick in The Go-Getter (2007)
- Pavel Olenev as Kuzma Ivanovich, the water carrier, and a chef in Volga-Volga (1938)
- Tom Oliver as the bodyguard, a bartender and a taxi driver in ABBA: The Movie (1977)
- Ashley Olsen as Lynn Farmer and young Aunt Agatha in Double, Double, Toil and Trouble (1993)
- Mary-Kate Olsen as Kelly Farmer and young Aunt Sophia in Double, Double, Toil and Trouble (1993)
- Ossi Oswalda as Ossi and the doll in The Doll (1919)
- Alec Owen as Brent and Brock in Dude Bro Party Massacre III (2015)

== P ==
- Deepika Padukone as Shantipriya and Sandhya (Sandy) in Om Shanti Om (2007)
- Deepika Padukone as Sakhi/Ms. TSM and Suzy/Meow Meow in Chandni Chowk to China (2009)
- Jack Palance as Arnie Judlow and Bill Judlow in House of Numbers (1957)
- Michael Palin as Sir Galahad the Pure, first swallow-savvy guard, Dennis, peasant #2, the lord of Swamp Castle, Brother Maynard's brother, and the leader of the knights who say NI! in Monty Python and the Holy Grail (1975)
- Michael Palin as Mr Big-Nose, Francis, Mrs A, ex-leper, Ben, Pontius Pilate, boring prophet, Eddie, Nisus Wettus, and the 3rd wise man in Monty Python's Life of Brian (1979)
- Lilli Palmer as Julia Klöhn and Angela Cavallini in A Woman Who Knows What She Wants (1958)
- Anatoli Papanov as Krokhalyov, chief, actor and sportsman in Nowhere Man (1961)
- Stephen Park as Roger Cho and Linus Mao in Asteroid City (2023)
- Eleanor Parker as Laura Fairlie and Anne Catherick in The Woman in White (1948)
- Nicole Parker as Paris Hilton, Britney Spears, Ellen DeGeneres, and Paula Abdul in Meet the Spartans (2008)
- Nicole Parker as Enchanted Princess, Amy Winehouse, and Jessica Simpson in Disaster Movie (2008)
- Sarah Jessica Parker as Betsy Nolan and Donna Korman in Honeymoon in Vegas (1992)
- Larry Parks as Al Jolson and himself in Jolson Sings Again (1949)
- Piolo Pascual as Juan Severino Mallari, John Rey, and Jonathan in Mallari (2023)
- Elsa Pataky as Mr. Norton and a Vulvalini general in Furiosa: A Mad Max Saga (2024)
- Dev Patel as Dr. Chatterjee, John Winston, and Timber Woods in The Wonderful Story of Henry Sugar and Three More (2024)
- Robert Pattinson as Mickey 17 and Mickey 18 in Mickey 17 (2025)
- Cezary Pazura as Jerzy Kiler and José Arcadio Morales in Kiler-ów 2-óch (1999)
- Harold Peary as Throckmorton P. Gildersleeve, Randolph Q. Gildersleeve, and Jonathan Q. Gildersleeve in Gildersleeve's Ghost (1944)
- Amza Pellea as Nea Mărin Juvete / Mr. Juvett in Uncle Marin, the Billionaire (1979)
- Tyler Perry as Mabel "Madea" Simmons, Joe Simmons and Brian Simmons in many Madea films starting with Diary of a Mad Black Woman (2005)
- Maria Perschy as Claudia and Martina in Melody of Hate (1962)
- Cassandra Peterson as Elvira and grand-aunt Morgana Talbot in Elvira: Mistress of the Dark (1988)
- Cassandra Peterson as Elvira and Lady Elura Hellusbus in Elvira's Haunted Hills (2001)
- Alistair Petrie as Haskell Moore's dinner guest #1, a musician, Sir Felix Finch, and a lascivious businessman in Cloud Atlas (2012)
- Hay Petrie as Axel Skold and Erik Skold in Contraband (1940)
- Jeff Daniel Phillips as Herman Munster, Shecky Von Rathbone, and Zombo in The Munsters (2022)
- Mary Pickford as Stella Maris and Unity Blake in Stella Maris (1918)
- Sasha Pieterse as Marissa Electricidad and Ice Princess in The Adventures of Sharkboy and Lavagirl (2005)
- Brad Pitt as Joe Black and a young man in a coffee shop in Meet Joe Black (1998)
- Jeremy Piven as the Danger D'Amo/The Timekeeper, Danger's father, and Tick Tock in Spy Kids: All the Time in the World (2011)
- Jesse Plemons as Robert, Daniel, and Andrew in Kinds of Kindness (2024)
- Elvira Popescu as Dora Nelson and Suzanne Verdier in Dora Nelson (1935)
- Henny Porten as Liesel Kohlhiesel and Gretel Kohlhiesel in Kohlhiesels Töchter (1920) and Kohlhiesels Töchter (1930)
- Natalie Portman as Ines and Alicia (Ines' daughter) in Goya's Ghosts (2006)
- Emma Portner as Amanda, Marco, the evil clown, and Mr. Melancholy in I Saw the TV Glow (2024)
- Franka Potente as Iris Sellin and Siri Sellin in Blueprint (2003)
- Renato Pozzetto as Ovidio Ceciotti and his twin brother Raffaele Ceciotti (also known as Raf Benson) in È arrivato mio fratello (1985)
- Prabhas as Billa and Ranga in Billa (2009)
- Prabhas as Sivudu/Mahendra Baahubali and Amarendra Baahubali in Baahubali: The Beginning (2015) and Baahubali 2: The Conclusion (2017)
- Prabhas as Bhairava and Karna in Kalki 2898 AD (2024)
- Samantha Ruth Prabhu as Shakeela and Gadgi Moi in 10 Endrathukulla (2015)
- Rajendra Prasad as Raja and Raja in Ulta Palta (1998)
- Micheline Presle as Janine Mercier and her daughter Jeannette in Paradise Lost (1940)
- Elvis Presley as Josh Morgan and Jodie Tatum in Kissin' Cousins (1964)
- Dennis Price as Louis D'Ascoyne Mazzini and his father in Kind Hearts and Coronets (1949)
- Vincent Price as Charles Dexter Ward and Joseph Curwen in The Haunted Palace (1963)
- Yvonne Printemps as Fanny Grandpré, Yvette Grandpré and Irène Grandpré in Three Waltzes (1938)
- Richard Pryor as Leroy Jones, Rufus Jones, and Reverend Lenox Thomas in Which Way Is Up? (1977)
- Liselotte Pulver as Liesel Kohlhiesel and Susi Kohlhiesel in Kohlhiesel's Daughters (1962)
- Jack Purvis as Jeremy and Gustavus in The Adventures of Baron Munchausen (1988)

== Q ==
- Randy Quaid as Frank Crawford and Cornell Crawford in Moving (1988)
- Margaret Qualley as Vivian, Martha, and twins Ruth and Rebecca in Kinds of Kindness (2024)

== R ==
- M. R. Radha as Kabali and Amirthalingam Pillai in Bale Pandiya (1962)
- Jerzy Radziwiłowicz as Mateusz Birkut and Maciek Tomczyk in Man of Marble (1977)
- Jerzy Radziwiłowicz as Mateusz Birkut and Maciek Tomczyk in Man of Iron (1981)
- Rajasekhar as Major Raj Kumar / Chinna Raja and Shrimannarayana in Raja Simham (1995)
- Rajasekhar as Madhu and Gopalam in Maa Annayya (2000)
- Rajasekhar as Siva and Vishnu in Villain (2003)
- Rajasekhar as Ashok and Sarvarayudu in Gorintaku (2008)
- William Ragsdale as Prince William and Jason Williamson in Mannequin Two: On the Move (1991)
- M. G. Ramachandran as Marthandan and Veerangan in Nadodi Mannan (1958)
- M. G. Ramachandran as King Desingu and Dawood Khan in Raja Desingu (1960)
- M. G. Ramachandran as Mohan and Komali in Kalai Arasi (1962)
- M. G. Ramachandran as Ramu and Ilango in Enga Veettu Pillai (1965)
- M. G. Ramachandran as Saravanan and himself in Thaer Thiruvizha (1968)
- M. G. Ramachandran as Anand and Sekhar/Babu in Kudiyirundha Koyil (1968)
- M. G. Ramachandran as King Vengaiyan and Prince Vengaiya in Adimai Penn (1969)
- M. G. Ramachandran as Velan and Raghu in Maattukara Velan (1970)
- M. G. Ramachandran as twins princes Manivannan and Karikalan in Neerum Neruppum (1971)
- M. G. Ramachandran as Murugan and Raju (alias Jairaj) in Ulagam Sutrum Valiban (1973)
- M. G. Ramachandran as Ponnaiya and Muthaiya in Pattikaattu Ponnaiya (1974)
- M. G. Ramachandran as Manickam (alias Rathnam) and Kumar in Netru Indru Naalai (1974)
- M. G. Ramachandran as Inspector Ramu "Payya" and Rahman Bai (alias Usthad Abdul Rahman) in Sirithu Vazha Vendum (1974)
- M. G. Ramachandran as Sundaram and Ranjith in Ninaithadhai Mudippavan (1975)
- M. G. Ramachandran as Shankar and Vijay Kumar in Naalai Namadhe (1975)
- M. G. Ramachandran as Selvam and Raja in Oorukku Uzhaippavan (1976)
- Ted Raimi as cowardly warrior, second supportive villager, and S-Mart clerk in Army of Darkness (1992)
- Ted Raimi as Mills Toddner, Wing, and sign painter in My Name Is Bruce (2001)
- Raimu as Achille Beaugérard and the other Achille Beaugérard, and as their father Alfred Beaugérard in The Brighton Twins (1936)
- Frances Raines as Alicia and Barbara Ann Michaels in Disconnected (1984)
- Rajinikanth as Billa and Rajappa in Billa (1980)
- Rajinikanth as Johnney and Vidyasagar in Johnny (1980)
- Rajinikanth as Chakravarthy and Santhosh in Netrikkann (1981)
- Rajinikanth as Raja and Ramesh in Pokkiri Raja (1982)
- Rajinikanth as Arun, Alex Pandian, and John in Moondru Mugam (1982)
- Rajinikanth as John, Jani, and Janardhan in John Jani Janardhan (1982)
- Rajinikanth as Balu and Shanker in Dharmathin Thalaivan (1988)
- Rajinikanth as Raja and Chinnarasu in Rajadhi Raja (1989)
- Rajinikanth as Kali Charan and Balu in Athisaya Piravi (1990)
- Rajinikanth as Shanker and Dayal in Tyagi (1992)
- Rajinikanth as Tamilazhakan and Tamilarasan in Uzhaippali (1993)
- Rajinikanth as Muthu and Maharaja in Muthu (1995)
- Rajinikanth as Arunachalam and Vedachalam in Arunachalam (1997)
- Rajinikanth as Baba and Babaji in Baba (2002)
- Rajinikanth as Saravanan and Vettaiyan Raja in Chandramukhi (2005)
- Rajinikanth as Dr. Vaseegaran and Chitti in Enthiran (2010)
- Rajinikanth as Kochadaiiyaan, Sena, and Rana in Kochadaiiyaan (2014)
- Rajinikanth as Raja Lingeswaran and Lingaa in Lingaa (2014)
- Rajinikanth as Dr. Vaseekaran, Chitti, and Kutty in 2.0 (2018)
- Rajkumar as Prashanth and Prakash in Daari Tappida Maga (1975)
- Rajkumar as Arjun and Babruvahana in Babruvahana (1977)
- Puneeth Rajkumar as Munna and his father Shankar in Veera Kannadiga (2004)
- Puneeth Rajkumar as ACP Vikram and Vikrama in Rana Vikrama (2015)
- Shiva Rajkumar as Muthanna and Diamond Kiran in Mutthanna (1994)
- Shiva Rajkumar as Shiva, Ramu, and Kumar in Annavra Makkalu (1996)
- Shiva Rajkumar as Subhash Chandra and Jeeva in Sarvabhouma (2004)
- Shiva Rajkumar as Ram and Bharamanna in Valmiki (2005)
- Shiva Rajkumar as Kumara Rama and Channa Rama in Gandugali Kumara Rama (2006)
- Shiva Rajkumar as Jeeva and Bhajarangi in Bhajarangi (2013)
- Puneeth Rajkumar (credited as Master Lohith) as Appu and Raju in Eradu Nakshatragalu (1983)
- Krishnam Raju as Arjuna and Kannappa Nayanar in Bhakta Kannappa (1976)
- Krishnam Raju as Virupaksha Raja and Krishna Chaitanya in Agni Poolu (1981)
- Krishnam Raju as Krishna and Raja in Ragile Jwala (1981)
- Krishnam Raju as Shankar and Mohan in Nipputo Chelagaatam (1982)
- Krishnam Raju as Arjuna Rao and Raja in Yuddham (1984)
- Krishnam Raju as Brahmanna and Ravi in Bobbili Brahmanna (1984)
- Krishnam Raju as K. Brahma Nayudu and K. Raghunath in Ravana Brahma (1986)
- Tony Randall as seven sideshow characters in 7 Faces of Dr. Lao (1964)
- Peter Rangmar as Harry Jernfeldt, and Sven Sidney in Stinsen brinner ...filmen alltså (1991)
- Akkineni Nageswara Rao as Ajay and Vijay in Iddaru Mitrulu (1961)
- Akkineni Nageswara Rao as Gopi and Shekhar in Govula Gopanna (1968)
- Akkineni Nageswara Rao as Madhavacharya and Gopi in Buddhimantudu (1969)
- Akkineni Nageswara Rao as Chinnayya and Bhaskar in Sipayi Chinnayya (1969)
- Akkineni Nageswara Rao as Justice Ramchandra Rao and Raju in Akka Chellelu (1970)
- Akkineni Nageswara Rao as Raja Raghupathi Rao and Sekhar in Dharma Daata (1970)
- Akkineni Nageswara Rao as Anand and Satyam in Manchivadu (1974)
- Akkineni Nageswara Rao as Gopi and Gopi in Bangaru Bommalu (1977)
- Akkineni Nageswara Rao as Ramu and Gopi in Sri Rama Raksha (1978)
- Akkineni Nageswara Rao as Red Lion Raghuveer and Ramachandra in Hema Hemeelu (1979)
- Akkineni Nageswara Rao as Ranga Rao and Venu in Yedanthasthula Meda (1980)
- Akkineni Nageswara Rao as Madhu and Balaaraju in Pilla Zamindar (1980)
- Akkineni Nageswara Rao as Pedababu Sarva Rayudu and Chinnababu in Prema Mandiram (1981)
- Akkineni Nageswara Rao as Gopala Krishna and Dr.Murthy in Gopala Krishnudu (1982)
- Akkineni Nageswara Rao as Ramu and Krishna in Ramudu Kadu Krishnudu (1983)
- Akkineni Nageswara Rao as Father James and S.P.John Yugandhar in S. P. Bhayankar (1984)
- Akkineni Nageswara Rao as Justice Chakravarthy and Kalyan in Justice Chakravarthy (1984)
- N. T. Rama Rao as Ramudu and Bheemudu in Ramudu Bheemudu (1964)
- N. T. Rama Rao as Satyanarayana Swamy and Satyadas in Sri Satyanarayana Mahathyam (1964)
- N. T. Rama Rao as Raja and Madhav in Aggi Pidugu (1964)
- N. T. Rama Rao as Raja and Vijay in Mangamma Sapatham (1965)
- N. T. Rama Rao as Srikrishnudu and Duryodhanudu in Sri Krishna Pandaveeyam (1966)
- N. T. Rama Rao as Raja and Gopi in Gopaludu Bhoopaludu
- N. T. Rama Rao as Anand Rao and Sundaram in Nirdoshi
- N. T. Rama Rao as Mohan and Shankaram in Tikka Sankaraiah (1968)
- N. T. Rama Rao as Raja and Jayanth in Gandikota Rahasyam (1969)
- N. T. Rama Rao as Ram Prasad (Paul) and Shyam Prasad in Bhale Thammudu (1969)
- N. T. Rama Rao as Ramudu, Krishnudu and Ravanudu in Sri Krishna Satya (1971)
- N. T. Rama Rao as Ramudu and Krishnudu in Sri Krishnanjaneya Yuddham (1972)
- N. T. Rama Rao as Raja Ramachandra Prasad, Raghunath Prasad and Shankar in Kula Gowravam (1972)
- N. T. Rama Rao as Kondadu and Rambabu in Vaade Veedu (1973)
- N. T. Rama Rao as Ramaiah and Musalaiah in Tatamma Kala (1974)
- N. T. Rama Rao as Dr. Ramu and Major Raghu in Ramuni Minchina Ramudu (1975)
- N. T. Rama Rao as Vishnuvu and Saint Maschindra in Maya Maschindra (1975)
- N. T. Rama Rao as Ramu and "Raja" Rajendrababu in Manushulanta Okkate (1976)
- N. T. Rama Rao as Srikrishnudu, Duryodhanudu, and Karnudu in Daana Veera Soora Karna (1977)
- N. T. Rama Rao as Srikrishnudu, Arjunudu, Duryodhanudu, and Kichakudu in Sri Madvirata Parvam (1979)
- N. T. Rama Rao as Yugandhar and Vijay in Yugandhar (1979)
- N. T. Rama Rao as Ramu and Raja in Circus Ramudu (1980)
- N. T. Rama Rao as Sardar Paparayudu and Inspector Ramu in Sardar Papa Rayudu (1980)
- N. T. Rama Rao as Raja and Anand Varma in Prema Simhasanam (1981)
- N. T. Rama Rao as Raja and Krishna in Gaja Donga (1981)
- N. T. Rama Rao as Viswam and Chittaiah in Viswaroopam (1981)
- N. T. Rama Rao as S. P. Ranjith Kumar and Ramu in Kondaveeti Simham (1981)
- N. T. Rama Rao as Justice R. K. Chowdary and Ramu in Justice Chowdary (1982)
- N. T. Rama Rao as Hari Chandra Prasad and Raja in Chanda Sasanudu (1983)
- N. T. Rama Rao as Viswamitrudu and Ravanudu in Brahmarshi Viswamitra (1991)
- N. T. Rama Rao as Ashokudu and Chanakyudu in Samrat Ashoka (1992)
- N. T. Rama Rao Jr. as Shankar pehlawan and Munna in Andhrawala (2004)
- N. T. Rama Rao Jr. as Chari and Narashima in Adurs (2010)
- N. T. Rama Rao Jr. as Jai, Lava, and Kusa in Jai Lava Kusa (2017)
- N. T. Rama Rao Jr. as Devara and Vara in Devara: Part 1 (2024)
- Bruce Ramsay as Phillip "Toymaker" LeMarchand, John Merchant, and Dr. Paul Merchant in Hellraiser: Bloodline (1996)
- Noomi Rapace as the Settman sisters (Monday, Tuesday, Wednesday, Thursday, Friday, Saturday, and Sunday) in What Happened to Monday (2017)
- Gary Raymond as Dick Lee-Carnaby and Graham in Traitor's Gate (1964)
- Christopher Reeve as Superman/Clark Kent and Evil Superman in Superman III (1983)
- Keanu Reeves as Ted Logan and Evil Robot Ted in Bill & Ted's Bogus Journey (1991)
- Frank Reicher as the cook and the spy in Mata Hari (1931)
- James Remar as Butch Pooch and Ace Speck in Django Unchained (2012)
- Ryan Reynolds as Wade Wilson/Deadpool and Nicepool (credited as Gordon Reynolds) in Deadpool & Wolverine (2024)
- Matthew Rhys as John Standing and Johnny Spence in The Scapegoat (2012)
- Miranda Richardson as Lady Elizabeth and Queen Elizabeth I in Blackadder: Back & Forth (1999)
- Kane Richmond as Spy Smasher/Alan Armstrong and Jack Armstrong in Spy Smasher (1942)
- Laurence Rickard as Sir Francis Walsingham, Lope Lopez, stand-up jester, chatty guard, slightly late courtier, Ian, hanging criminal, and chicken drumstick in Bill (2015)
- Jan Rippe as Ernst Ivarsson and Rafael in Stinsen brinner ...filmen alltså (1991)
- John Ritter as Agent Pillbox and Bob Wilson in Real Men (1987)
- Pat Roach as Toht's Sherpa henchman and the German mechanic in Raiders of the Lost Ark (1981)
- Margot Robbie as Annie and Bonnie in Terminal (2018)
- Margot Robbie as Steenbeck's deceased wife and the actress playing her in Asteroid City (2023)
- Julia Roberts as Tess Ocean and herself in Ocean's Twelve (2004)
- Muriel Robin as Frénégonde de Pouille and Béatrice de Montmirail in The Visitors II: The Corridors of Time (1998)
- Edward G. Robinson as Arthur Ferguson Jones and "Killer" Mannion in The Whole Town's Talking (1935)
- Edward G. Robinson as Max Stratman and Walter Stratman in The Prize (1963)
- Lara Robinson as young Diana Embry-Wayland, Abby Wayland, and young Luclinda Embry in Knowing (2009)
- Tony Robinson as Baldrick and Legionary Baldricus in Blackadder: Back & Forth (1999)
- Sam Rockwell as Sam Bell and his clones in Moon (2009)
- José López Rodero as Pablo & Pedro Ceniza in The Ninth Gate (1999)
- Michelle Rodriguez as multiple clones of Rain Ocampo in Resident Evil: Retribution (2012)
- Daniel Roebuck as The Count and Ezra Mosher in The Munsters (2022)
- Seth Rogen as Herschel Greenbaum and Ben Greenbaum in An American Pickle (2020)
- Roy Rogers as guitar player, singer and cowhand Len in The Old Wyoming Trail (1937)
- Roy Rogers as himself and Billy the Kid in Billy the Kid Returns (1938)
- Roy Rogers as Jesse James and Clint Burns in Jesse James at Bay (1941)
- Roy Rogers as himself and Bill Sloan in Sunset on the Desert (1942)
- Clayton Rohner as Clifford and Bruno X in Modern Girls (1986)
- Gilbert Roland as Kasim, the desert hawk, and Hassan, his evil twin brother, in The Desert Hawk (1944)
- Hrithik Roshan as Rohit and Raj in Kaho Naa... Pyaar Hai (2000)
- Hrithik Roshan as Krishna Mehra / Krrish and Rohit Mehra in Krrish (2006) and Krrish 3 (2013)
- Michael Ross as Tony the bartender and space giant in Attack of the 50 Foot Woman (1958)
- Sandhya Roy as Aparna and Suparna in Kuheli (1971)
- Emily Rudd as Cindy Berman and Abigail Berman in Fear Street Part Three: 1666 (2021)
- Heinz Rühmann as Dr. Hans Pfeiffer and Erich Pfeiffer in Such a Rascal (1934)
- Heinz Rühmann as Peter Pett and Patrick Pett in Five Million Look for an Heir (1938)
- Heinz Rühmann as Dr. Lancelot Dodd and Dr. Ivor Marmion in A Mission for Mr. Dodd (1964)
- Geoffrey Rush as Peter Sellers, Bill Sellers, Ann Howe, Stanley Kubrick, Peg Sellers, and Blake Edwards in The Life and Death of Peter Sellers (2004)
- Kurt Russell as Stephen "Bull" McCaffrey and Dennis McCaffrey in Backdraft (1991)
- Jake Ryan as Woodrow Steenbeck and the understudy for Woodrow in Asteroid City (2023)
- Meg Ryan as DeDe, Angelica Graynamore, and Patricia Graynamore in Joe Versus the Volcano (1990)
- Winona Ryder as Elisabeta and Mina Harker in Bram Stoker's Dracula (1992)

== S ==
- William Sadler as Death and an English gentleman in Bill & Ted's Bogus Journey (1991)
- Anna Salunke as both Lord Rama and his wife Sita in Lanka Dahan (1917)
- Vsevolod Sanayev as a bearded lumberjack and a member of the symphony orchestra in Volga-Volga (1938)
- Mart Sander as 48 characters in Dr. Sander's Sleep Cure (2024). The 48 characters are recognized as the most for any actor in a single film by the Guinness Book of World Records.
- George Sanders as Simon Templar and Duke Bates in The Saint's Double Trouble (1940)
- Adam Sandler as Jack Sadelstein and Jill Sadelstein in Jack and Jill (2011)
- Chris Sarandon as Charles Darnay and Sydney Carton in A Tale of Two Cities (1980)
- Susan Sarandon as Madame Horrox, Ursula, Yusouf Suleiman, and the Abbess in Cloud Atlas (2012)
- Tobias Schenke as Tim and Robbie in Kleinruppin Forever (2004)
- Andy Serkis as Lumpy and King Kong in King Kong (2005)
- Sabine Sesselmann as Aurore de Nevers and Isabelle de Caylus in Le Bossu (1959)
- Rosanna Schiaffino as Ariadne and Phaedra in Minotaur, the Wild Beast of Crete (1960)
- Romy Schneider as Elsa Wiener and Lina Baumstein in The Passerby (1982)
- Dimitrius Schuster-Koloamatangi as Dek and Njohrr in Predator: Badlands (2025)
- Jason Schwartzman as Augie Steenbeck and Jones Hall in Asteroid City (2023)
- Arnold Schwarzenegger as Jack Slater, Prince Hamlet, and himself in Last Action Hero (1993)
- Arnold Schwarzenegger as Adam Gibson and his clone in The 6th Day (2000)
- Campbell Scott as Scotty Corrigan and Colonel Caleb Denby of the 19th Masschuetts Infantry in The Love Letter (1998)
- Lizabeth Scott as Alice Brent and Lily Conover in Stolen Face (1952)
- Margaretta Scott as Roxana Black and Rowena Cabal in Things to Come (1936)
- Randolph Scott as Leo and John Vincey in She (1935)
- Seann William Scott as twins Roland and Ronald in Southland Tales (2006)
- Sean Scully as Prince Edward and Tom Canty in The Prince and the Pauper (1962)
- Peter Sellers as Grand Duchess Gloriana XII, Prime Minister Count Rupert Mountjoy, and Tully Bascombe in The Mouse That Roared (1959)
- Peter Sellers as Fred Kite and Sir John Kennaway in I'm All Right Jack (1959)
- Peter Sellers as Group Captain Lionel Mandrake, President Merkin Muffley, and Dr. Strangelove in Dr. Strangelove or: How I Learned to Stop Worrying and Love the Bomb (1964)
- Peter Sellers as Général Latour, Major Robinson, Herr Schroeder, Adolf Hitler, the President, and Prince Kyoto in Soft Beds, Hard Battles (1974)
- Peter Sellers as Rudolf IV, Rudolf V, and Syd Frewin in The Prisoner of Zenda (1979)
- Peter Sellers as Fu Manchu and Sir Denis Nayland Smith in The Fiendish Plot of Dr. Fu Manchu (1980)
- Suchitra Sen as Panna Bai and Suparna in Uttar Falguni (1963)
- Jane Seymour as Elena Korvin and Maria Gianelli in The Phantom of the Opera (1983)
- Carmen Sevilla as Dolores and Rosa in Guerreras verdes (1976)
- Varun Sharma as Joy Chauhan and Joy Shenoy in Cirkus (2022)
- William Shatner as Johnny Moon and Notah in Comanche blanco (1968)
- Moira Shearer as Sylvia, Daphne, Olga, and Colette in The Man Who Loved Redheads (1955)
- Norma Shearer as Molly Helmer and Florence Banning in Lady of the Night (1925)
- Norma Shearer as Kathleen and Moonyeen in Smilin' Through (1932)
- Cali Sheldon as Becca Tyler and her doppelgänger Io in Us (2019)
- Noelle Sheldon as Lindsay Tyler and her doppelgänger Nix in Us (2019)
- Dax Shepard as Waylan, Patrick Jeung, Patrick Justice, and himself in Brother's Justice (2010)
- Miriam Shor as Carol and a penthouse hostess in Bedazzled (2000)
- Jackie Shroff as Suresh and Solanki Patwardhan Lal in Mera Jawab (1985)
- Jackie Shroff as Allah Rakha aka Iqbal Anwar and Don Jr. in Allah Rakha (1986)
- Jackie Shroff as Rajesh Bannerjee and Vijay Chauhan in Mard Ki Zabaan (1987)
- Jackie Shroff as Anil Varna and Jai in Vardi (1989)
- Jackie Shroff as Inspector Jai Kishen and Jamliya Jamshed Purwala in Azaad Desh Ke Gulam (1990)
- Jackie Shroff as Prince Harshvardan and Govardan in Dil Hi To Hai (1993)
- Jackie Shroff as Inspector Jai Kishen and Ram in Police Officer (1992)
- Sylvia Sidney as Princess Catterina and Nancy Lane in Thirty-Day Princess (1934)
- Alastair Sim as Millicent Fritton and Clarence Fritton in The Belles of St Trinian's (1954)
- Gene Simmons as Velvet von Ragner and Carruthers in Never Too Young to Die (1986)
- Michel Simon as Faust and Mephistopheles in Beauty and the Devil (1950)
- Ranveer Singh as Roy Chauhan and Roy Shenoy in Cirkus (2022)
- Sadie Sink as young Ziggy Berman and Constance Berman in Fear Street Part Three: 1666 (2021)
- Sivakarthikeyan as Rajini Murugan and Bosepandi in Rajini Murugan (2016)
- Sivakarthikeyan as Seema Raja and Kadambavel Raja in Seema Raja (2018)
- Red Skelton as Louis Blore and King Louis XV in DuBarry Was a Lady (1943)
- Red Skelton as Rusty Cammeron, Pop Cammeron, and Grandpop Cammeron in Watch the Birdie (1950)
- John Slater as twin brothers Fred and Allan Bamber in Deadlock (1943)
- McCabe Slye as Tommy Slater and Mad Thomas in Fear Street Part Three: 1666 (2021)
- Dulcie Smart as Ursula's mother and an herbalist in Cloud Atlas (2004)
- Kevin Smith as Silent Bob and himself in Jay and Silent Bob Reboot (2019)
- Ondřej Sokol as Honza Rambousek and Richard Prospal in Doppelgängers (2016)
- Son Ye-jin as Ji-Hye and Joo-Hee in The Classic (2003)
- Mark Soper as Todd and Terry Simmons in Blood Rage (1987)
- Türkan Şoray as Canan and Jale in Ne Şeker Şey (1962)
- Türkan Şoray as Behlül and Eylül Servan in Genç Kızlar (1963)
- Türkan Şoray as Ayşe, Zehra, and Leyla in Ekmekçi Kadın (1965)
- Türkan Şoray as Türkân and Peri in Meleklerin İntikamı (1966)
- Türkan Şoray as Şükran and Leyla in Ağlayan Kadın (1967)
- Türkan Şoray as Nesrin and Leyla in Artık Sevmeyeceğim (1968)
- Türkan Şoray as Leyla and Hicran in Ağla Gözlerim (1968)
- Türkan Şoray as Şükran and Türkan in Mazi Kalbimde Yaradır (1970)
- Türkan Şoray as Leyla Ergüvenç and Şaziye in Gülüm, Dalım, Çiçeğim (1971)
- Türkan Şoray as Selma and Cavidan in Çılgınlar (1974)
- Türkan Şoray as Zeliş and Leyla Taner in Şenlik Var / Bal Kız (1974)
- Türkan Şoray as Aygül and Selma in Seni Seviyorum (1983)
- Alberto Sordi as Marchese del Grillo and Gasperino in Il Marchese del Grillo (1981)
- Sissy Spacek as Mrs. Martin, Natasha, and two more mothers in Trading Mom (1994)
- Kevin Spacey as prot and Robert Porter in K-PAX (2001)
- David Spade as Damien Farley and Monica in Jack and Jill (2011)
- James Spader as John Westford and Rick Westford in Jack's Back (1988)
- Bud Spencer as Greg Wonder and Antonio Coimbra de la Coronilla y Azevedo in Double Trouble (1984)
- Brent Spiner as Data and B-4 in Star Trek: Nemesis (2002)
- Jordana Spiro as Mrs. Lane and The Widow in Fear Street Part Three: 1666 (2021)
- Sridevi as Lord Karthikeya (six forms) in Malayalam film Kumarasambhavam (1969)
- Sridevi as Sathi and Viji (mother and daughter) in Malayalam film Agneekaram (1977)
- Sridevi as Tara and Radha's daughter (multiple characters) in Tamil film Machanai Partheengala (1978)
- Sridevi as Shanthi and Jenny (twins) in Tamil film Vanakkatukuriya kathaliye (1978)
- Sridevi as Seeta and Geeta (twins) in Telugu film Mosagadu (1980)
- Sridevi as Uma and Rama (twins) in Hindi film Guru (1989)
- Sridevi as Rajni and Neelam in Hindi film Nigahen: Nagina Part II (1989)
- Sridevi as Anju and Manju (twins) in Hindi film ChaalBaaz (1989)
- Sridevi as Devi and Reshma (reincarnated character) in Banjaran (1991)
- Sridevi as Pallavi and Pooja (mother and daughter) in Hindi film Lamhe (1991)
- Sridevi as Benazir and Mehendi (mother and daughter) in Hindi film Khuda Gawah (1992)
- Sridevi as Sunita and Kavita (aka Rosy and Priya, twins) in Hindi film Gurudev (1993)
- Sriimurali as Jagan Mohan and Jayaratnakra in Bharaate (2019)
- LaKeith Stanfield as André Hayworth and Logan King in Get Out (2017)
- LaKeith Stanfield as Clarence and his twin brother Thomas in The Book of Clarence (2023)
- Ringo Starr as himself and Magician #4 (Talkative Magician) in Magical Mystery Tour (1967)
- Barbara Steele as Katia Vajda and Asa Vajda in Black Sunday (1960)
- Barbara Steele as Jenny and Muriel in Nightmare Castle (1965)
- Tommy Steele as Tony Whitecliffe and Tommy Hudson in The Duke Wore Jeans (1965)
- Mary Steenburgen as Julie Rose, Katie McGovern, and Evelyn in Dead of Winter (1987)
- Yorgos Stefanakos as R.M.F., who appears as Raymond's employee, a helicopter pilot, and a dead man in Kinds of Kindness (2024)
- Michael Stefani as Martin Whistler and Detective Weisling in Trancers (1985)
- Zdeněk Štěpánek as Jan Hus and Jan Žižka in Jan Hus (1954)
- Ben Stiller as Pluto's cook and Attila the Hun in Highway to Hell (1992)
- Ben Stiller as Tony Perkis and Tony Perkis Sr. in Heavyweights (1995)
- Ben Stiller as Sam Sweet and Stan Sweet in The Cable Guy (1996)
- Ben Stiller as Larry Daley and Laaa in Night at the Museum: Secret of the Tomb (2014)
- Erik Stolhanske as Todd Wolfhouse and Baron Ludwig von Wolfhausen in Beerfest (2006)
- Emma Stone as Bella Baxter and Victoria Blessington in Poor Things (2023)
- Emma Stone as Rita, Liz, and Emily in Kinds of Kindness (2024)
- Lewis Stone as Rudolf Rassendyll and King Rudolf V in The Prisoner of Zenda (1922)
- Meryl Streep as Sarah Woodruff / Mrs. Roughwood and Anna in The French Lieutenant's Woman (1981)
- Meryl Streep as Ellen Martin, Elena, and herself in The Laundromat (2019)
- Jim Sturgess as Adam Ewing, a poor guest at an Edinburgh hotel, Megan's Dad, a Highlander, Hae-Joo Chang, and Adam in Cloud Atlas (2012)
- Master Sudhakar as Narendra Dev and Naarigadu in Raju Peda (1954)
- Prithivraj Sukumaran as Ventakesh / Siddharth in Robin Hood (2009)
- Prithviraj Sukumaran as Kelu and Krishnadas in Urumi (2011)
- Kemal Sunal as Hanzo and Cabbar in Hanzo (1975)
- Kemal Sunal as Şakir and his uncle Hasan Emmi in Sakar Şakir (1977)
- Kemal Sunal as twin brothers Kemal and Cemal in İyi Aile Çocuğu (1978)
- Kemal Sunal as Şaban and Kaleci Bülent in İnek Şaban (1978)
- Kemal Sunal as Osman and Seyfi in Gerzek Şaban (1980)
- Kemal Sunal as Abdi and Narcin in Kanlı Nigâr (1981)
- Kemal Sunal as Şaban Ağa and Dilaver Bey in Sosyete Şaban (1985)
- Kemal Sunal as Ali and himself in Bıçkın (1988)
- Suriya as Chinna and Karthik in Perazhagan (2004)
- Suriya as Vasudevan and Vetrivel in Vel (2007)
- Suriya as Krishnan and Suriya Krishnan in Vaaranam Aayiram (2008)
- Suriya as Aravind and Bodhidharma in 7 Aum Arivu (2011)
- Suriya as Akhilan and Vimalan in Maattrraan (2012)
- Suriya as Masss a.k.a. Masilamani and Sakthi in Massu Engira Masilamani (2015)
- Suriya as Sethuraman, Athreya, and Manikandan in 24 (2016)
- Suriya as Kanguva and Francis Theodore in Kanguva (2024)
- Donald Sutherland as Charles and Pierre in Start the Revolution Without Me (1970)
- Tilda Swinton as Thora Thacker and Thessaly Thacker in Hail, Caesar! (2016)
- Tilda Swinton as sisters Nancy and Lucy Mirando in Okja (2017)
- Tilda Swinton as Madame Blanc, Mother Helena Markos, and Dr. Josef Klemperer in Suspiria (2018)
- Tilda Swinton as Julie Hart and Rosalind Hart in The Eternal Daughter (2022)

== T ==
- Vic Tablian as Barranca and monkey man in Raiders of the Lost Ark (1981)
- Sharmila Tagore as Aparna Bai and Kankabati (mother & daughter) in Kalankini Kankabati (1981)
- Constance Talmadge as Helen Weyringer and La Perry in Her Sister from Paris (1925)
- Akim Tamiroff as Jules LaCroix and President Alvarado in The Magnificent Fraud (1939)
- Meshach Taylor as Hollywood Montrose and a club doorman in Mannequin Two: On the Move (1991)
- Scott Teeters as Lenny and Benny in Sin City (2005)
- Ravi Teja as Lakshaman and Lakshman in O Panaipothundi Babu (1998)
- Ravi Teja as DCP Vikram Singh Rathore IPS and Athili Sathi Babu in Vikramarkudu (2006)
- Ravi Teja as Bullet Raja and Ravindra in Daruvu (2012)
- Ravi Teja as Kalyan and Robin Hood in Kick 2 (2015)
- Ravi Teja as Disco Raja and Vasu in Disco Raja (2020)
- Margarita Terekhova as Maria and Natalia in Mirror (1975)
- Sophie Thatcher as Iris and another companion robot in Companion (2025)
- Henry Thomas as Jack Torrance and Lloyd in Doctor Sleep (2019)
- Tovino Thomas as Kunjikelu, Maniyan and Ajayan in ARM (2024)
- Marsha Thomason as Sarah Evers and Elizabeth Henshaw in The Haunted Mansion (2004)
- Tim Thomerson as Jack Deth and Phil Dethton in Trancers (1985)
- Emma Thompson as Amanda Sharp and Margaret Strauss in Dead Again (1991)
- Lea Thompson as Maggie McFly and Lorraine McFly in Back to the Future Part III (1990)
- Uma Thurman as Venus and Rose in The Adventures of Baron Munchausen (1988)
- Uma Thurman as Emma and Gloria in Oh, Canada (2024)
- Mukesh Tiwari as Samudra's father (1962) and Radhakrishan in Anegan (2015)
- Stephen Tobolowsky as Happy Chapman and his brother Walter in Garfield: The Movie (2004)
- Lily Tomlin as Pat Kramer, Judith Beasley, and Ernestine in The Incredible Shrinking Woman (1981)
- Lily Tomlin as Rose Ratliff and Rose Shelton in Big Business (1988)
- Jacob Tomuri as Max Rockatansky and The Dogman in Furiosa: A Mad Max Saga (2024)
- Tonatiuh as Luis Molina and Kendall Nesbitt in Kiss of the Spider Woman (2025)
- Totò as Galeazzo, Carlo, Scipione, Antonino and Laudomia di Torrealta and Pasquale Bonocore in Totò Diabolicus (1962
- Sylvestra Le Touzel as Haskell Moore's dinner guest #5, Nurse Judd, and a slaughtership aide in Cloud Atlas (2012)
- Christian Tramitz as Jörg Kasirske, Bronko Kulička, David Hasselhoff, Captain Kork, Old Shatterhand, Franz, Mr. Moneymaker and Castanet 2 in Bullyparade: The Movie (2017)
- John Travolta as Castor Troy and Sean Archer in Face/Off (1997)
- Shannon Tweed as Cindy Lansing and Audrey Lansing in Last Call (1991)
- Stanisław Tym as Ryszard Ochódzki and Stanisław Paluch in Teddy Bear (1980)

== U ==
- Upendra as Satya, Kalki and himself in UI (2024)

== V ==
- Vadivelu as Telex Pandian and "Setup" Chellappa in Ennamma Kannu (2000)
- Vadivelu as Steve Waugh, Mark Waugh, and their parents in Manadhai Thirudivittai (2001)
- Vadivelu as Vadivelu and Vibration in Bagavathi (2002)
- Vadivelu as A. Swaminathan and Muniyandi in Ilasu Pudhusu Ravusu (2003)
- Vadivelu as Pulikecei XXIII and Ukraputhan in Imsai Arasan 23am Pulikecei (2006)
- Vadivelu as Vellam (Tamilman) and Englishman in Nenjil Jil Jil (2006)
- Vadivelu as Indra, Yama, and Na. Azhagappan in Indiralohathil Na Azhagappan (2008)
- Vadivelu as Tenaliraman and The King of Vikata Nagaram in Tenaliraman (2014)
- Rudolph Valentino as Ahmed and the Sheik in The Son of the Sheik (1926)
- Lee Van Cleef as Father John and Lewis in God's Gun (1976)
- Jean-Claude Van Damme as Alex Wagner and Chad Wagner in Double Impact (1991)
- Jean-Claude Van Damme as Alain Moreau and Mikhail Suverov in Maximum Risk (1996)
- Jean-Claude Van Damme as Rudy Cafmeyer and Charles Le Vaillant in The Order (2001)
- Jean-Claude Van Damme as the Replicant and Edward Garrotte in Replicant (2001)
- Dick Van Dyke as Bert and Mr. Dawes Sr. in Mary Poppins (1964)
- Valentina Vargas as Angelique and the Peasant Girl in Hellraiser: Bloodline (1996)
- Jim Varney as Ernest P. Worrell and Felix Nash in Ernest Goes To Jail (1990)
- Vice Ganda as Girlie, Peter, Mark, and Panying in Girl, Boy, Bakla, Tomboy (2013)
- Conrad Veidt as Wenzel Schellenberg and Michael Schellenberg in The Brothers Schellenberg (1926)
- Conrad Veidt as Balduin and his doppelgänger in The Student of Prague (1926)
- Conrad Veidt as Gwynplaine and Lord Clancharlie in The Man Who Laughs (1928)
- Conrad Veidt as Otto Becker and his pro-Nazi twin brother Baron Hugo von Detner in Nazi Agent (1942)
- Patricia Velásquez as Anck-Su-Namun and Meela Nais in The Mummy Returns (2001)
- Venkatesh as Aggi Ramudu and Vijay in Aggiramudu (1990)
- Venkatesh as Chanti and Balaraju in Pokiri Raja (1995)
- Venkatesh as Harischandra Prasad and Bhanu Prasad in Suryavamsam (1998)
- Venkatesh as Mahadeva Naidu and Rudrama Naidu / Abhiram in Jayam Manade Raa (2000)
- Venkatesh as Balaram and Krishna in Devi Putrudu (2001)
- Venkatesh as Subhash Chandra Bose and Ashok in Subhash Chandra Bose (2005)
- Venkatesh as Naagabhairava Raajasekhara and Vijay in Nagavalli (2010)
- Carlo Verdone as Enzo, Ruggero, Leo, Don Alfio, and the Professor in Un Sacco Bello (1980)
- Carlo Verdone as Pasquale Amitrano, Furio Zoccano, and Mimmo in Bianco, Rosso e Verdone (1981)
- Carlo Verdone as Sergio Benvenuti and Manuel Fantoni in Borotalco (1982)
- Carlo Verdone as Raniero Cotti-Borroni, Giovanni, and Ivano in Viaggi di Nozze (1995)
- Carlo Verdone as Leo, Prof. Cagnato, and Moreno Vecchiarutti in Grande, Grosso e Verdone (2008)
- Vijay as Gurumoorthy and Prasad in Azhagiya Tamil Magan (2007)
- Vijay as Pugazh and Major Saravanan in Villu (2009)
- Vijay as Kaththi a.k.a. Kathiresan and Jeevanandham in Kaththi (2014)
- Vijay as Marudheeran and Pulivendhan in Puli (2015)
- Vijay as Vetri, Maaran, and Vetrimaaran in Mersal (2017)
- Vijay as Rayappan and Michael Rayappan a.k.a. Bigil in Bigil (2019)
- Vijay as Gandhi and Sanjay and several Jeevan clones in The Greatest of All Time (2024)
- Alicia Vikander as Essel and Lady Bertilak in The Green Knight (2021)
- Vikram as Akhilan Vinod and Love in Iru Mugan (2015)
- Vikram as DCP Aarusaamy "Saamy" and his son IPS Ramasaamy "Ram" in Saamy² (2018)
- Vikram as Madhiazhagan (Madhi) and Kathir (Cobra) in Cobra (2022)
- Paolo Villaggio as Giandomenico Fracchia and the ruthless public enemy nicknamed "la Belva Umana" in Fracchia la belva umana (1981)
- Alvaro Vitali as Alvaro Gasperoni and Pippetto in Pierino medico della S.A.U.B. (1981)
- Alvaro Vitali as Alvaro the plumber and Paulo Roberto Cotechiño in Paulo Roberto Cotechiño centravanti di sfondamento (1983)
- Behrouz Vossoughi as Reza Motori and Faroukh in Reza Motorcyclist (1971)
- Vyjayanthimala as Madhumathi, Madhavi, and Radha in Madhumati (1958)

== W ==
- Otto Waalkes as Otto Groß and Benno Groß in Otto - Der Außerfriesische (1989)
- Otto Waalkes as Otto, Otto's mother, Amor and Karl Masutra in Otto – Der Liebesfilm (1992)
- Otto Waalkes as Otto, Otto's grandfather and Otti the singer in Otto – Der Katastrofenfilm (2000)
- Anton Walbrook as Balduin and his doppelgänger in The Student of Prague (1935)
- Basil Wallace as Screwface and Screwface in Marked for Death (1990)
- Jack Warden as Roy L. Fuchs and Luke Fuchs in Used Cars (1980)
- Raymond Waring as Corporal Trim and himself in A Cock and Bull Story (2005)
- David Warner as Ed Dillinger, Sark, and the voice of the M.C.P. in Tron (1982)
- E. Alyn Warren as Stephen A. Douglas and General Ulysses S. Grant in Abraham Lincoln (1930)
- Marlon Wayans as Alan, Dawn, Russel, Ethan, Baby Pete, Jaspar, and Lynette Spellman in Sextuplets (2019)
- John Wayne as Football Player and extra in stands in The Drop Kick (1927)
- John Wayne as horse race spectator and condemned man in flashback in Hangman's House (1928)
- Hugo Weaving as Haskell Moore, Tadeusz Kesselring, Bill Smoke, Nurse Noakes, Boardman Mephi, and Old Georgie in Cloud Atlas (2012)
- Paul Wegener as Balduin and his doppelgänger in The Student of Prague (1913)
- Rachel Weisz as Evelyn Carnahan O'Connell and Princess Nefertiri in The Mummy Returns (2001)
- Rachel Weisz as Angela Dodson, Isabel Dodson, and Mammon in Constantine (2005)
- Rachel Weisz as Isabella I of Castile and Izzi Creo in The Fountain (2006)
- Olivia Scott Welch as Samantha Fraser and Hannah Miller in Fear Street Part Three: 1666 (2021)
- Orson Welles as Hagolin and Lamerciere in Crack in the Mirror (1960)
- Jan Werich as Rudolf II, Holy Roman Emperor and Matthew, a baker, his look-alike in The Emperor and the Golem (1951)
- Jan Werich as storyteller/castle warden Oliva and the magician in The Cassandra Cat (1963)
- Ben Whishaw as a cabin boy, Robert Frobisher, a record store clerk, Georgette Cavendish, and a tribesman in Cloud Atlas (2012)
- Peter Whitney as Mert Fleagle and Bert Fleagle in Murder, He Says (1945)
- Gene Wilder as Claude and Philippe in Start the Revolution Without Me (1970)
- Spencer Wilding as Nathaniel and Prometheus in Victor Frankenstein (2015)
- Ben Willbond as King Philip II of Spain, Earl of Southampton, grubby thief, Alexander Dimitrievitch and Head of Guards in Bill (2015)
- Guinn Williams as Al and Ham in Noah's Ark (1928)
- Michelle Williams as Annie and Glinda in Oz the Great and Powerful (2013)
- Luke Wilson as Alex Sheldon and Adam Shipley in Alex & Emma (2003)
- Thomas F. Wilson as Biff Tannen and Griff Tannen in Back to the Future Part II (1989)
- Thomas F. Wilson as Biff Tannen and Buford "Mad Dog" Tannen in Back to the Future Part III (1990)
- Alex Winter as Bill S. Preston, Esq., Evil Robot Bill, and Granny Preston in Bill & Ted's Bogus Journey (1991)
- Jonathan Winters as Wilbur Glenworthy and Henry Glenworthy in The Loved One (1965)
- Norman Wisdom as Norman Pitkin and General Schreiber in The Square Peg (1959)
- Norman Wisdom as Norman Pitkin and Giulio Napolitani in On the Beat (1962)
- Norman Wisdom as Norman Shields/ Emily, his mother/ Wilfred, his grandfather (the P.M.) in Press for Time (1966)
- Martin Wuttke as Mr. Boerhaave, a security guard, and Leary the healer in Cloud Atlas (2012)

== Y ==
- Yury Yakovlev as Ivan the Terrible and Ivan Bunsha in Ivan Vasilievich: Back to the Future (1973)
- Tsutomu Yamazaki as Yôzô Tajimi and Hisaya Tajimi in Village of Eight Gravestones (1977)
- Alexander Yassin as a Seaboard board member, an Indian party guest, and a Papa Song's customer in Cloud Atlas (2012)
- Dustin Ybarra as Troy and his doppelgänger Brand in Us (2019)
- Cem Yılmaz as Arif Işık, Komutan Logar Trihis, Erşan Kuneri, Komutan Kubar, and Vumar's son Timar in G.O.R.A (2004)
- Cem Yılmaz as Arif Işık, Kaaya, Komutan Logar, Kubar, and Enigma in A.R.O.G (2008)
- Cem Yılmaz as Zafer Yildiz and Besi in Coming Soon (2014)
- Cem Yılmaz as Ali Şenay and Boris Mancov in Ali Baba and the Seven Dwarfs (2015)
- Cem Yılmaz as Arif Işık and Erşan Kuneri in Arif V 216 (2018)
- Cem Yılmaz as Ayzek and Alpay in Karakomik Filmler (2019)
- Alan Young as Charlie Biddle, Mrs. Biddle, and Mr. Henry Biddle in Gentlemen Marry Brunettes (1955)
- Alan Young as David Filby and James Filby in The Time Machine (1960)
- Robert Young as Brooks Mason and George Smith in Honolulu (1939)
- Sean Young as Ellen Carlsson and Dorothy Carlsson in A Kiss Before Dying (1991)
- Sean Young as Rachael and Rachael's clone (facial likeness) in Blade Runner 2049 (2017)

== Z ==
- Jerzy Zelnik as the protagonist Ramses XIII and his nemesis Lykon in Pharaoh (1966)
- Zhou Xun as Talbot the hotel manager, Yoona-939, and Rose in Cloud Atlas (2012)
- Zhu Zhu as Megan Sixsmith and a fabricant released from her contract in Cloud Atlas (2012)
- Sheri Moon Zombie as Lily and Donna Doomley in The Munsters (2022)
- George Zucco as Dr. Lloyd Clayton and Dr. Elwyn Clayton in Dead Men Walk (1943)
- Matthew Zuk as Mayor Will Goode and Alderman Goode in Fear Street Part Three: 1666 (2021)
- Ashley Zukerman as Sheriff Nick Goode and Solomon Goode in Fear Street Part Three: 1666 (2021)
- Daphne Zuniga as Kelly and Terry Fairchild in The Initiation (1984)
