= Kamer Sadık =

Turkish actor

- Born: Kamer Sadıkyan; 1911; Istanbul, Ottoman Empire
- Died: September 24, 1986 (aged 74–75); Kayseri, Turkey
- Occupation: Actor
- Years active: 1930–1985

Kamer Sadık (1911 – September 24, 1986) was a Turkish actor of Armenian origin.

== Filmography ==
- 1953 - Çifte Kavrulmuş
- 1961 - Tenten ve Altın Post
- 1962 - Kısmetin En Güzeli
- 1962 - Erkeklik Öldü mü Atıf Bey
- 1963 - İntikam Hırsı
- 1963 - Çalınan Aşk
- 1964 - Tophaneli Osman (Avukat)
- 1964 - Tığ Gibi Delikanlı
- 1964 - Sokakların Kanunu (Hasan)
- 1965 - Serseri Aşık
- 1965 - Pantolon Bankası
- 1970 - Red Kit
- 1974 - Atını Seven Kovboy (Bankacı)
- 1977 - Sakar Şakir (Sabri Amca)
- 1979 - Korkusuz Korkak (Mülayim Ters)
