= 3 Supermen Against the Godfather =

- Directed by: Italo Martinenghi
- Screenplay by: Italo Martinenghi; Antonio Cesare Corti
- Story by: Italo Martinenghi
- Produced by: Türker İnanoğlu
- Starring: Aldo Canti; Sal Borgese; Cüneyt Arkın; Aldo Sambrell
- Cinematography: Aldo Ricci; Çetin Gürtop
- Edited by: Italo Martinenghi
- Music by: Nico Fidenco
- Production companies: Barbatoja Film; Cinesecolo; Asbrell Productions; Erler Film
- Release date: 1979
- Running time: 87 minutes
- Countries: Italy; Spain; Turkey

3 Supermen Against the Godfather (Italian: 3 supermen contro il padrino, Turkish: Süpermenler) is a 1979 superhero film directed by Italo Martinenghi.

== Plot ==
A German professor (Ali Şen) constructs a time machine and decides to experiment with it in Turkey. He discovers where the Byzantines hid their treasury during the Fall of Constantinople. After this success becomes known, the mafia and world powers fight for the ownership of the time machine. The boss of the mafia wants to find his lost heroin and the world powers want to rule their enemies via the machine. Murat (Cüneyt Arkın) and the other "Süpermenler", a band of three detective superheroes, come to the aid of the German scientist and manage to save the world in the end.

== Cast ==
- Aldo Canti as Atak
- Sal Borgese as Matrak
- Cüneyt Arkın as Detective Murat/Agent Brad
- Aldo Sambrell as Baba Jackson
- Güngör Bayrak as Agata
- Übsak Emre as Agata's lover

== Production ==
The time between when Italo Martinenghi directed The 3 Supermen in the West and 3 Supermen Against the Godfather was a time of backlash within the Italian film industry. With the rising popularity of television in Italy ticket, box office fell from 455 million to 374 million from 1976 and 1977. In 1979, this had diminished further to 276 million. This led to some filmmakers in Italy to move their productions to Turkey where they could create b-movies for less demanding and more enthusiastic audiences.

Through Martinenghi's friend Guido Zurli, Martinenghi collaborated with Turkish film producer Türker İnanoğlu to start his second entry in the Three Supermen film series. Superhero films were popular in Turkey, a country which had produced its own renditions of superhero films such as The Phantom (Kizil Maske (1968)) Superman (Süpermen Fantom'ya Karst (1969)) and 3 Dev Adam featuring El Santo, Captain America, and Spider-Man.

The film cast Aldo Canti who had starred in previous 3 Supermen films, Turkish actor Cüneyt Arkın, and Aldo Sambrell as the godfather who also co-produced the film with his Spanish company Asbrell.

== Release ==
3 Supermen Against the Godfather was released in Turkey in 1979 and in Italy in 1980. Italian film historian described its release as "practically never distributed" and that it was a film that only surfaced on home video about a quarter of a century later. The film was followed by two sequels: Three Supermen at the Olympic Games (1984) and Three Supermen in S. Domingo (1986).
