= Sakar Şakir =

1977 Turkish comedy film

- Directed by: Natuk Baytan
- Written by: Natuk Baytan; Suavi Sualp
- Produced by: Yahya Kılıç
- Starring: Kemal Sunal; Adile Naşit
- Cinematography: Rafet Şiriner
- Release date: 1977
- Running time: 81 minutes
- Country: Turkey
- Language: Turkish

Sakar Şakir is a 1977 Turkish comedy film directed by Natuk Baytan. He co-wrote the screenplay with Suavi Sualp. Produced by Yahya Kılıç, it stars Kemal Sunal in the title role alongside Adile Naşit, Ali Şen and Ünal Gürel. The film runs approximately 81 minutes.

== Cast ==
- Kemal Sunal - Sakir
- Adile Naşit - Fatma Sen
- Ali Şen - Haci Sen
- Ünal Gürel - Gardrop Fuat
- Ayfer Feray - Sevda
- Necdet Yakın - Lufer
- Atilla Ergün - Sukru
- Kamer Sadik - Sabri
