= King Oscars Bridge =

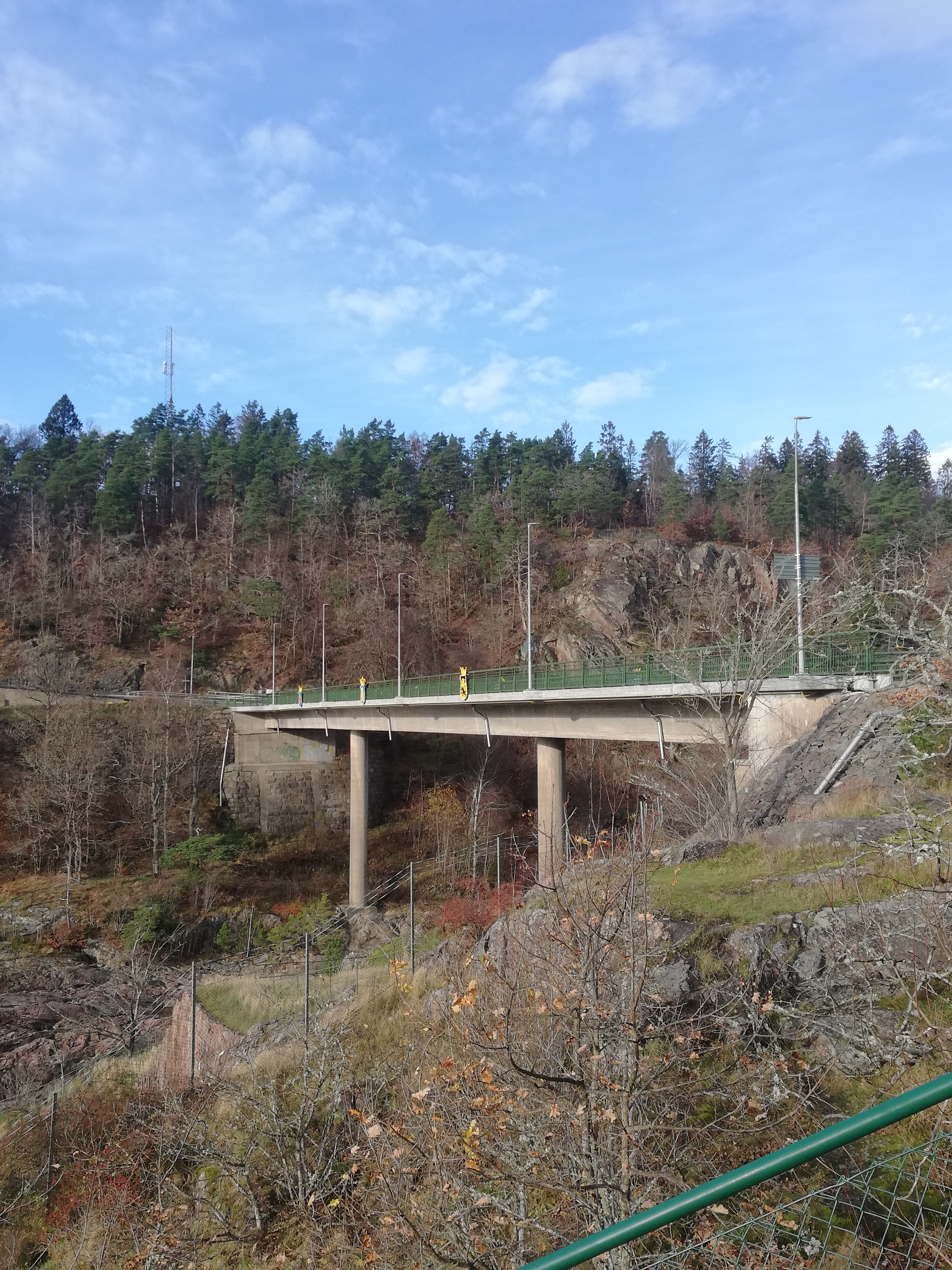
- View of King Oscar's Bridge from eastern side towards Strömslund
- Coordinates: 58°16′48.96″N 12°16′37.56″E
- Crosses: Göta River
- Locale: Trollhattan, Sweden

Characteristics
- Total length: 109.5 metres (359 ft)
- Width: 10.5 metres (34 ft)
- Height: 50 metres (160 ft) (estimated)
- Longest span: 97.5 metres (320 ft)

History
- Opened: 1969

Statistics
- Daily traffic: Motor vehicle, pedestrian

King Oscars Bridge (known as Oscarsbron in Swedish) is a single arch concrete bridge which spans the Göta River at the Trollhättan Falls in the town of Trollhättan. The present bridge was completed in 1969 and replaced the original bridge which was built in 1889, to connect the suburb of Strömslund to the town.

As a result of its location close to the falls, as well as the Olidan and Hojum hydroelectric power stations, the bridge was a popular tourist attraction in Sweden for many years, and remains a popular viewing platform during the annual Fallens Dagar – an annual event in which water is released over the original falls at Trollhättan. As a result of its size and impressive views of the falls, for a long time, King Oscars Bridge was one of Sweden's most visited tourist attractions.

== History ==
The first bridge at the site was completed in 1889 by Nydqvist & Holm after two years of construction. Planning of the bridge took a total 13 years, however, due to difficulties in deciding how to overcome the challenges posed by the powerful currents of the river and, in particular, the turbulent churning at the exit of the falls.

The original bridge was the first effective crossing over the river and paved the way for the expansion of the town onto the opposite side of the Göta River including the suburb of Strömslund on the western side of the river and Sweden's first planned, private residential suburb.

== Other ==
On the eastern side of the river, the bridge is flanked by The Kings Cave (Kungsgrottan), also known as Trollhättan's "Royal Guestbook".

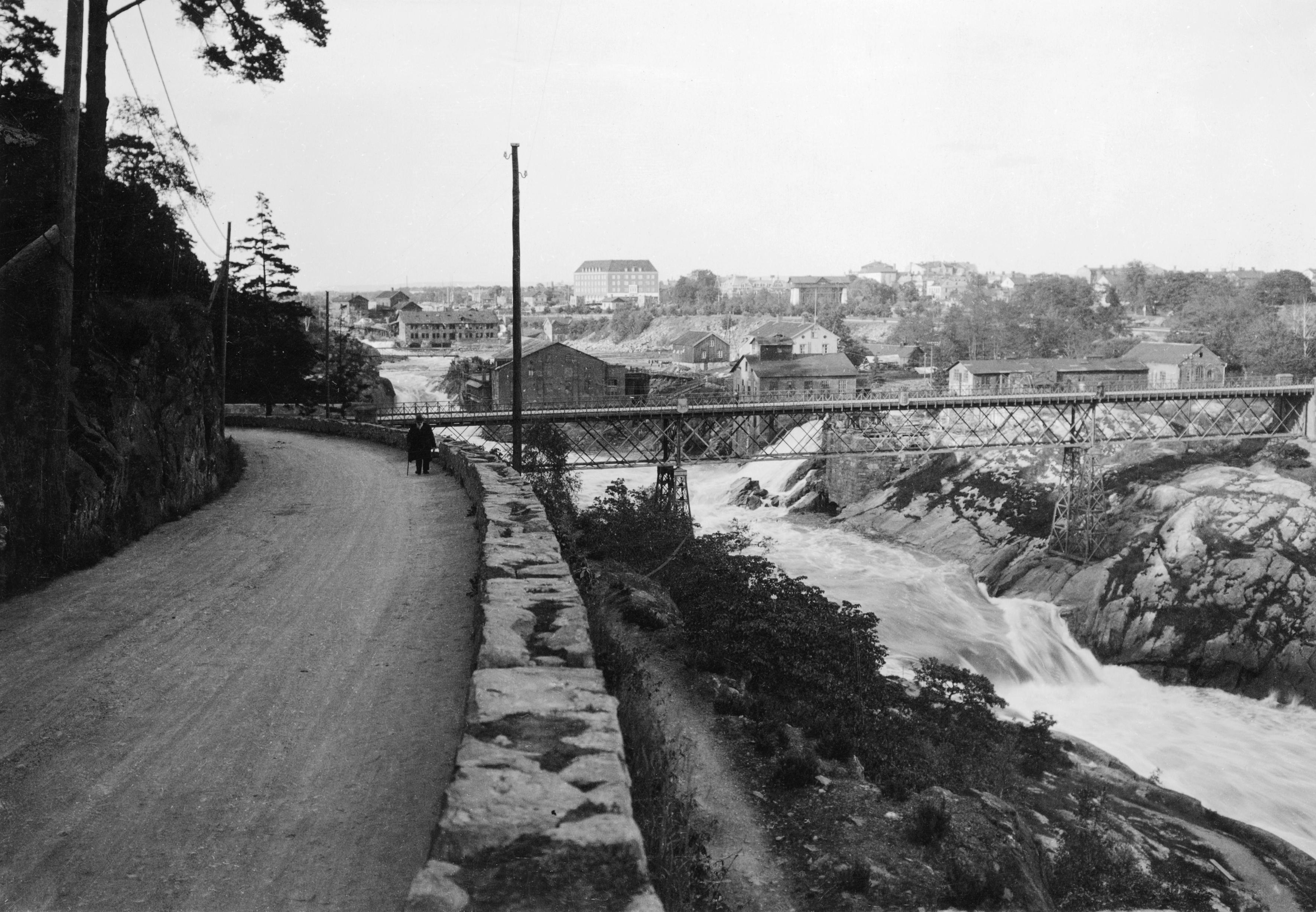
View of original bridge over the Trollhattan Falls circa 1924

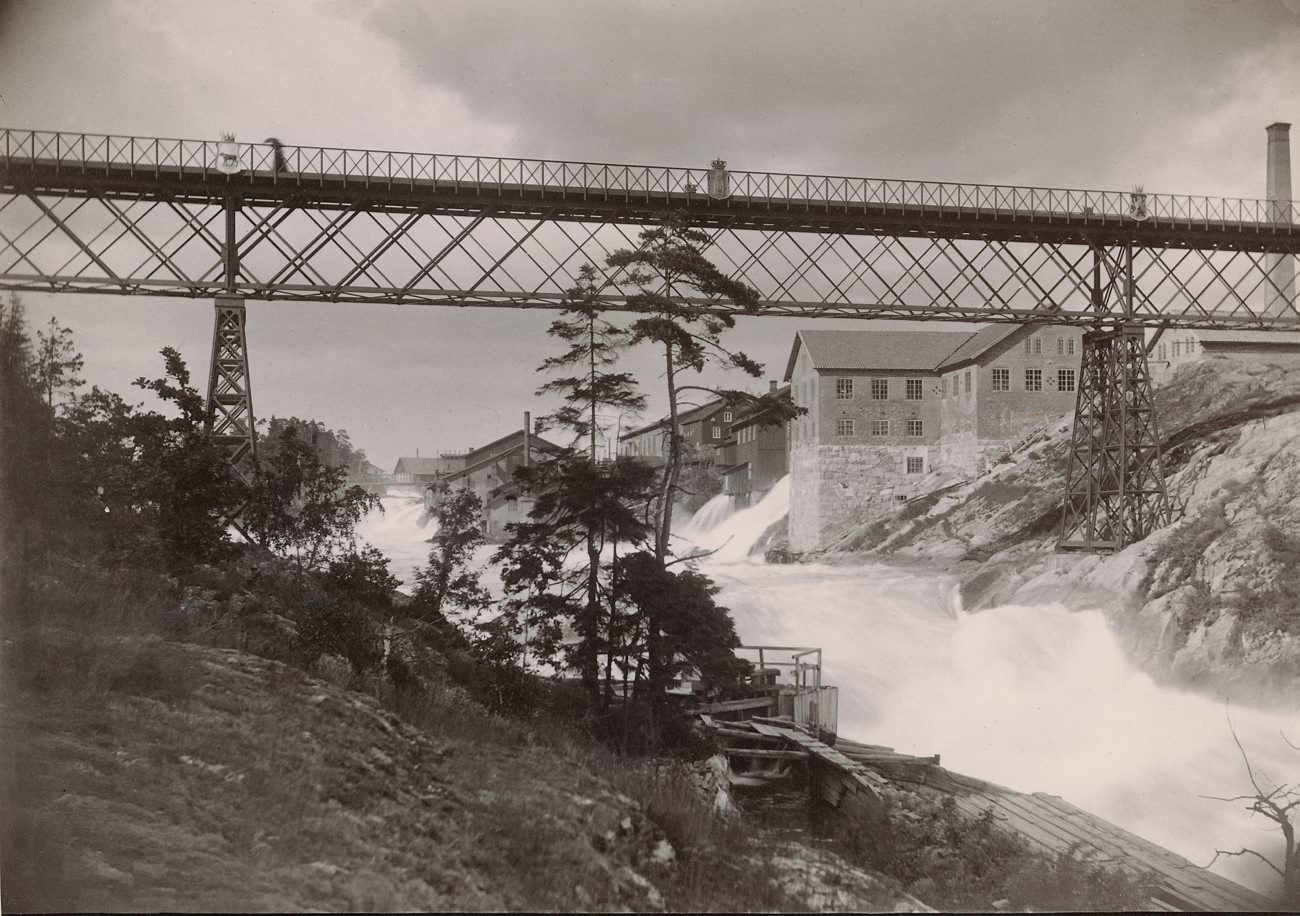
View of original bridge from beneath

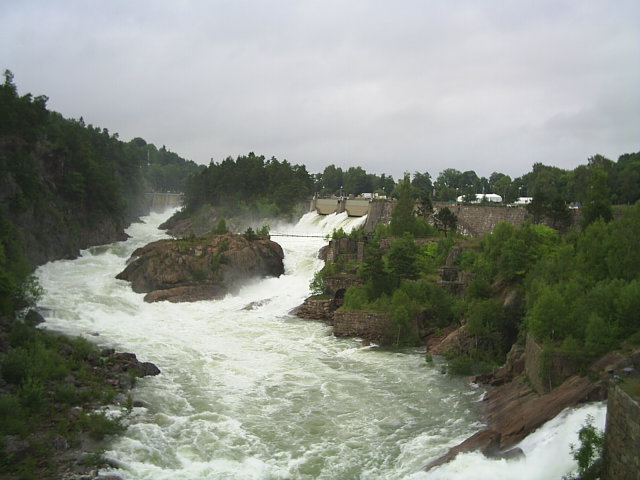
Modern day view of Trollhattan Falls in full flow from King Oscars Bridge

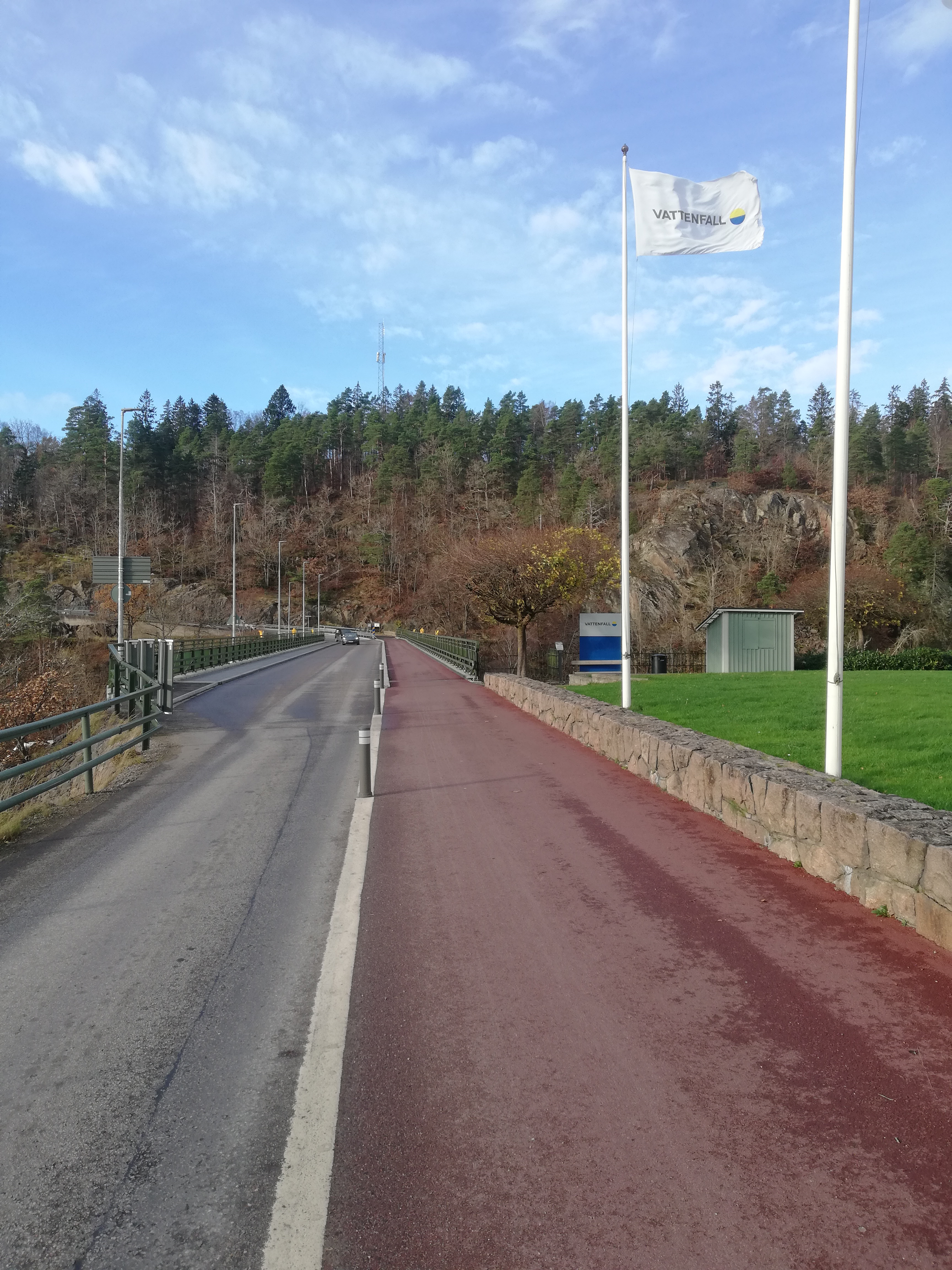
Contemporary view across King Oscars Bridge towards Stromslund, Trollhattan
