= The Copper Cliff =

- Kopparklinten (Swedish)
- Interactive map of The Copper Cliff
- 58°16′34.7″N 12°16′17.3″E
- Location: Trollhättan, Sweden

The Copper Cliff (known as Kopparklinten in Swedish) is a viewpoint in the Älvrummet Nature Reserve on the western side of the Göta river, overlooking the Olidan Power Plant, in Trollhättan. The site is approximately 77 m above sea level and has views over the city of Trollhättan to as far as Hunneberg mountain in the distance.

== History ==
During the Second World War, the site served primarily as a mount for anti-aircraft guns to be able to defend the power station against possible German attacks.

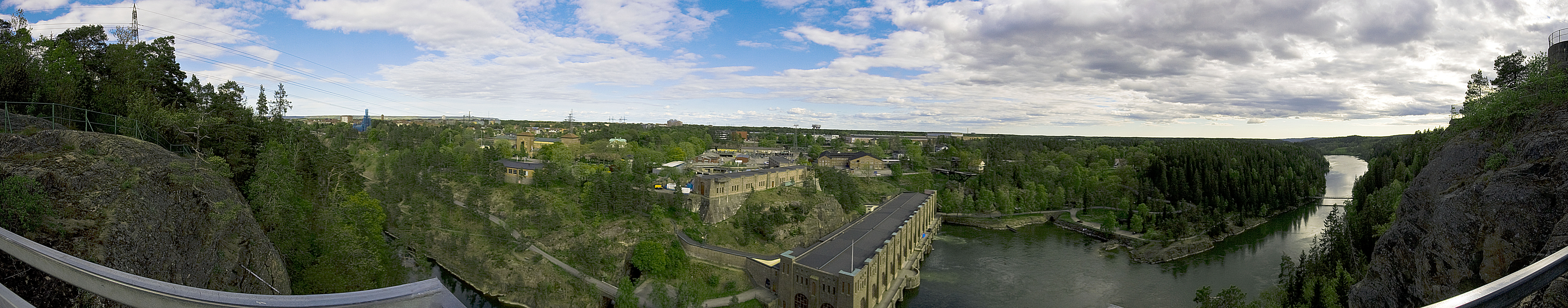
Panorama from Kopparklinten in Trollhättan, with Olidan Hydroelectric Power Station visible below.
