= The Kings Cave (Sweden) =

- Kungsgrottan (Swedish)
- Trollhättan's Royal guestbook
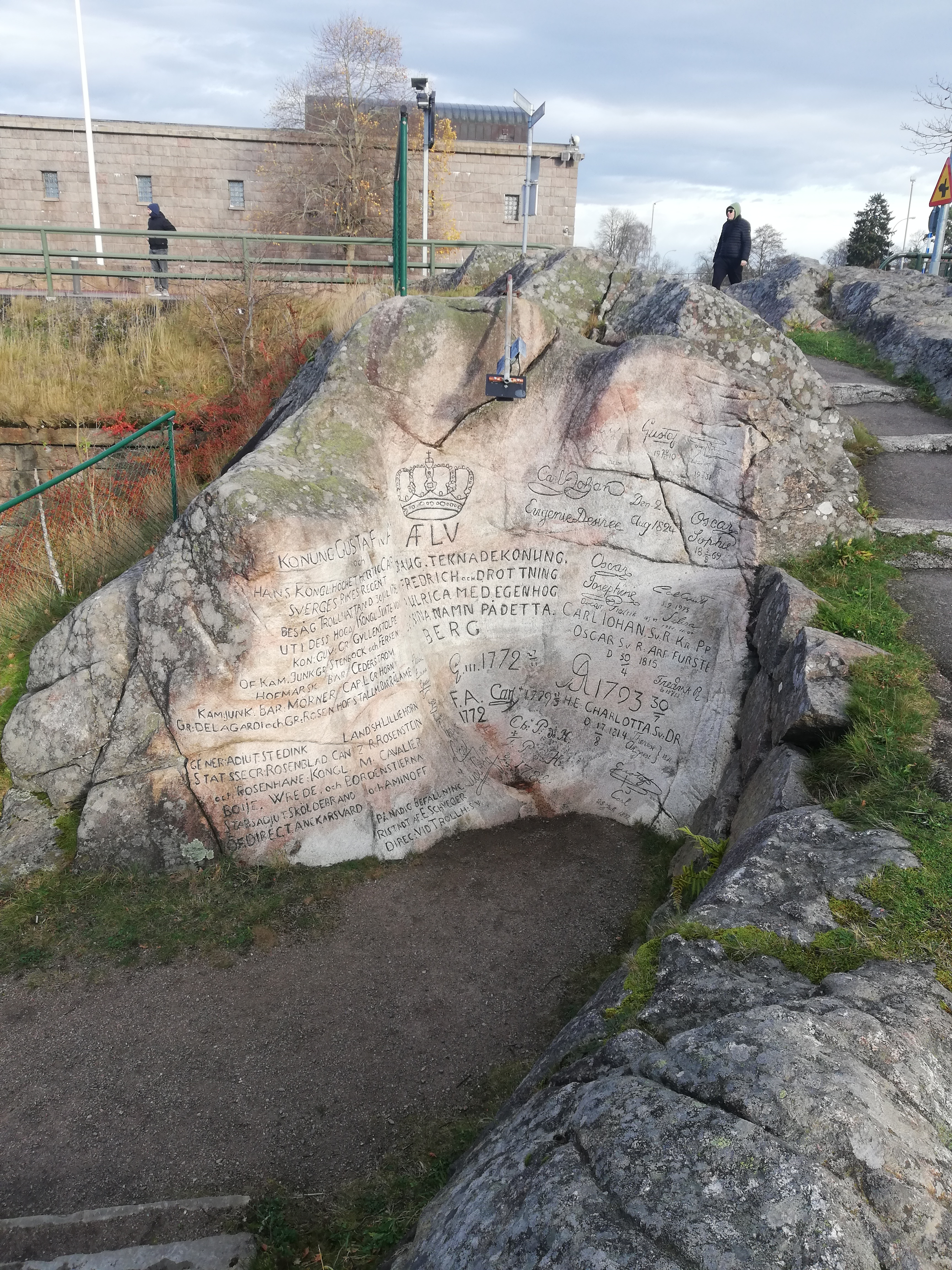
- View of The Kings Cave and inscriptions, Trollhattan, Sweden
- Interactive map of The Kings Cave
- 58.2800°N 12.2783°E -->
- Location: Trollhättan, Sweden

Site notes
- Elevation: 50 metres (160 ft)

The King's Cave (also known as Kungsgrottan in Swedish) is a shallow cave (a Giant's kettle) formed into the granite rock alongside the Gota River in Trollhattan, Sweden. The cave was formed through natural causes and over the centuries, was visited by numerous Swedish monarchs, who inscribed their names into the rock. As a result, the cave has become a Swedish landmark and also known colloquially as Trollhättan's "Royal guestbook" ("Trollhättan's kungliga gästbok").

The cave is flanked by King Oscars Bridge on the eastern side, which crosses the Göta River south of the well known Trollhattan Falls.

The cave has inscriptions from monarchs as far back as King Adolf Fredrik and his wife Lovisa Ulrika in 1754 to the present day Swedish king Carl XVI Gustaf. The most recent addition includes an inscription from Crown Princess and heir-apparent to the Swedish throne, Victoria, who visited in 2001.

== Gallery ==
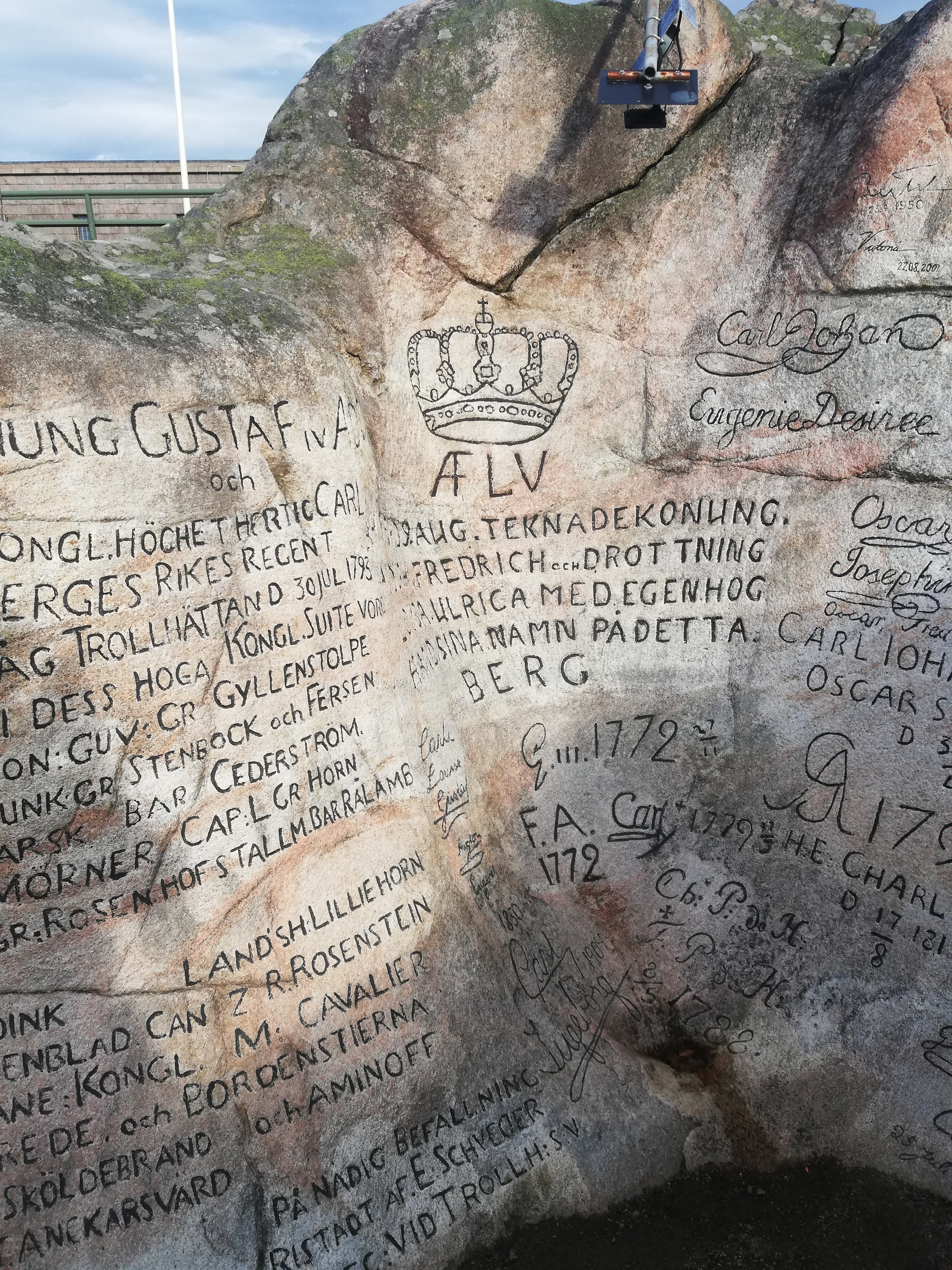
Inscriptions of various Swedish monarchs at The Kings Cave

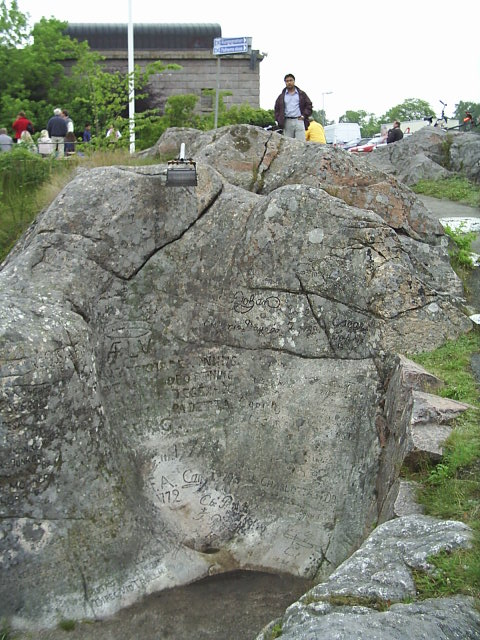
Another view of the grotto with Hojum Power Station in the background
