= Trollhättan Water Tower =

Building in Trollhättan, Sweden

Coordinates: 58°16.932′N 12°17.454′E

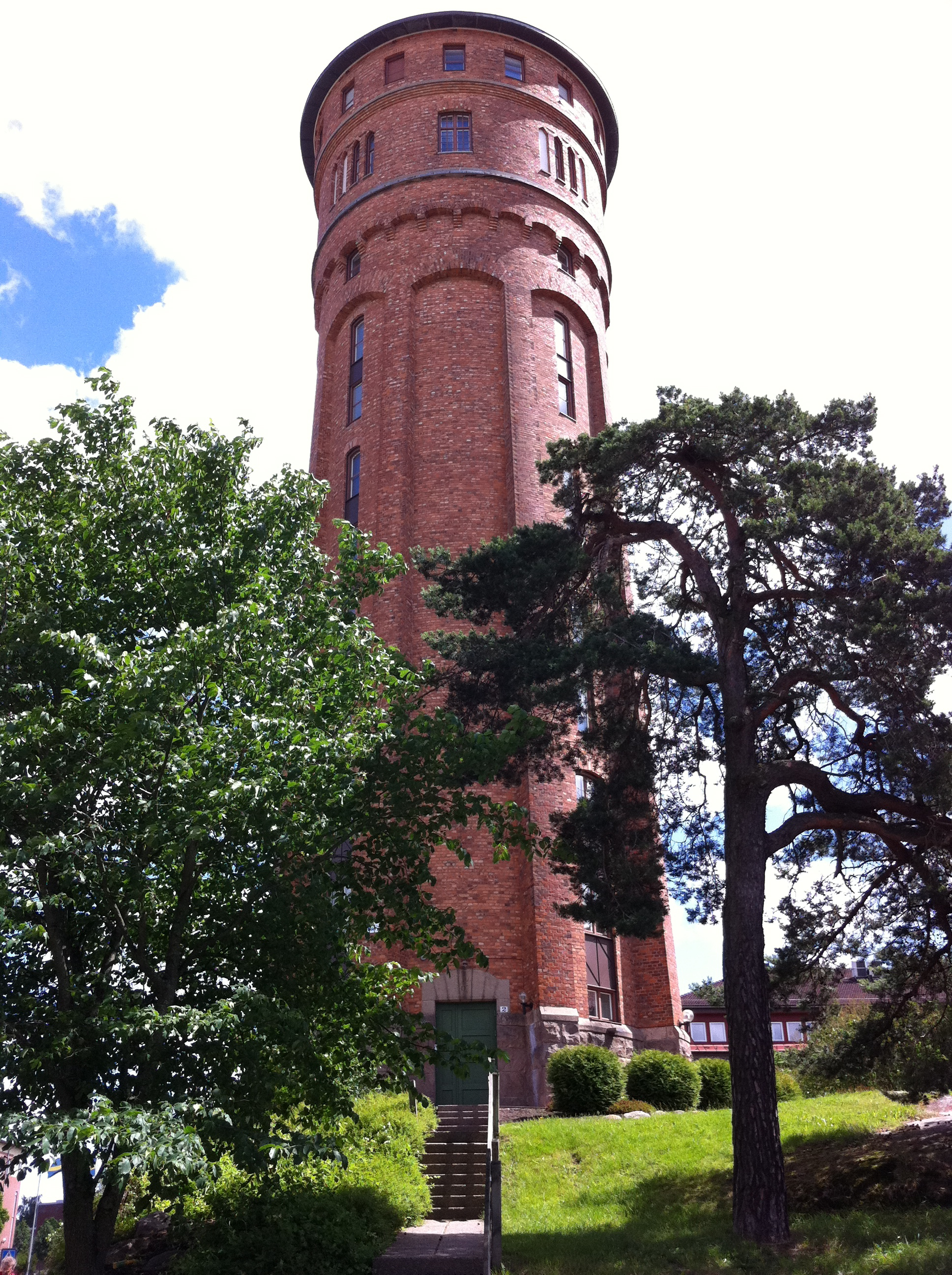
The Water Tower in central Trollhättan

The Trollhättan Water Tower is a landmark in central Trollhättan in Västergötland, Sweden. It is located next to Drottningtorget ("the Queen's Square") and University College West. The tower was built in 1909 by architect Erik Josephsson at the same year as Olidan Power Station. In 1992 it was converted to a tower of apartments. In total the tower consists of nine one- or two-storey apartments.

== See also ==
- Water tower
