= Eli Arnstad =

Norwegian civil servant, sports official and politician

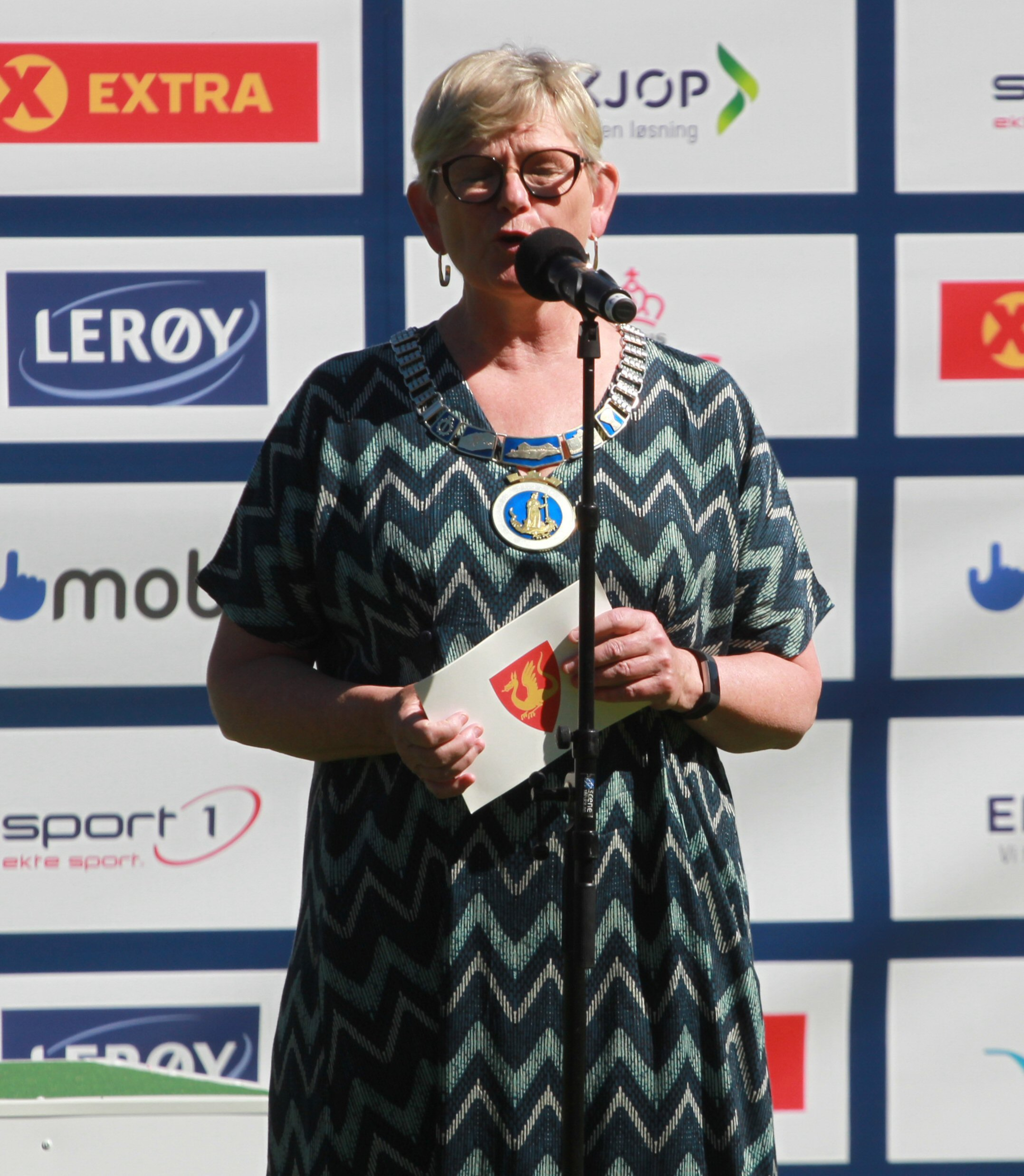

Eli Arnstad (born 4 May 1962) is a Norwegian civil servant, sports official and politician for the Centre Party.

== Early life and career ==
She was born in Stjørdal Municipality as a daughter of accountant and farmer Arne Arnstad (1932–1980) and nurse Aasta Arnstad, née Auran (1938–). She is a twin sister of the prominent politician Marit Arnstad and mother of Ada Arnstad.

Having graduated from high school in 1981, she first studied at Mære Agricultural School until 1983. She is an educated business administrator from the Nord-Trøndelag University College, having graduated as cand.mag. in 1999. She also minored in public law in 1986 and political science in 1989.

She became involved in politics in the early 1980s. She chaired the regional party chapter of the Centre Youth from 1982 to 1985. She then became involved in the Nordiska Centerns Ungdomsforbund, presiding over that organization from 1989 to 1991. From 1991 to 1992 she worked in the civil service of Trollhättan Municipality in Sweden.

== Political career ==
Arnstad was an elected member of Nord-Trøndelag county council from 1983 to 1991. She served as a deputy representative to the Storting from Nord-Trøndelag during the terms 1985–1989 and 1989–1993. From 1985 to 1986 and 1989 to 1990 she moved up as a regular representative, filling in for Johan J. Jakobsen who was appointed to two different cabinets, first in the Second Willoch cabinet and then in the Syse cabinet. In total she met during 1 year and 313 days of parliamentary session.

Having stepped down from a political career, she has held a number of positions as a civil servant. She was the director of Stiklestad Centre of Culture from 1999 to 2000 and chief executive officer of Enova from 2001 to 2007. She also became a supervisory council member of Sparebanken Midt-Norge in 2005 and board member at Posten Norge in 2006. In 2010 she was elected as the leader of Trøndelag District Association for football, and in 2014 she became a board member of the Football Association of Norway. She represents the club IL Fram.

Arnstad was elected to the municipal council of Stjørdal Municipality. After mayor Ivar Vigdenes resigned in 2022, Arnstad became the new mayor. She won a term in her own right at the 2023 Norwegian local elections.
