= Trollhättan Falls =

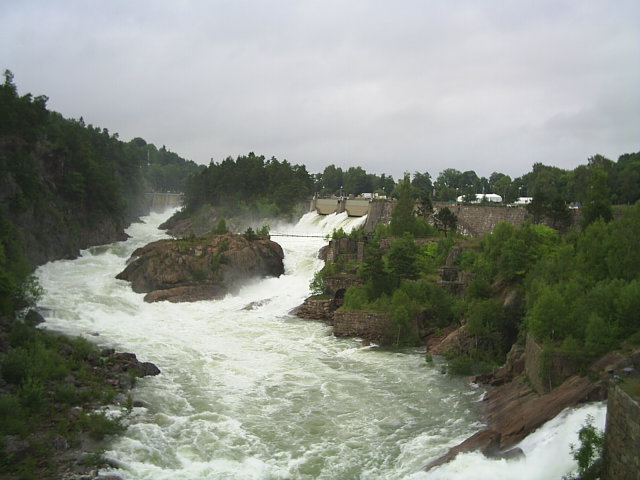
- Trollhättan Falls on "Day of the Waterfalls", 18 July 2004
- Interactive map of Trollhättan Falls
- Location: Västra Götaland County, Sweden
- Coordinates: 58°16.9′N 12°16.7′E
- Total height: 32 metres (105 ft)

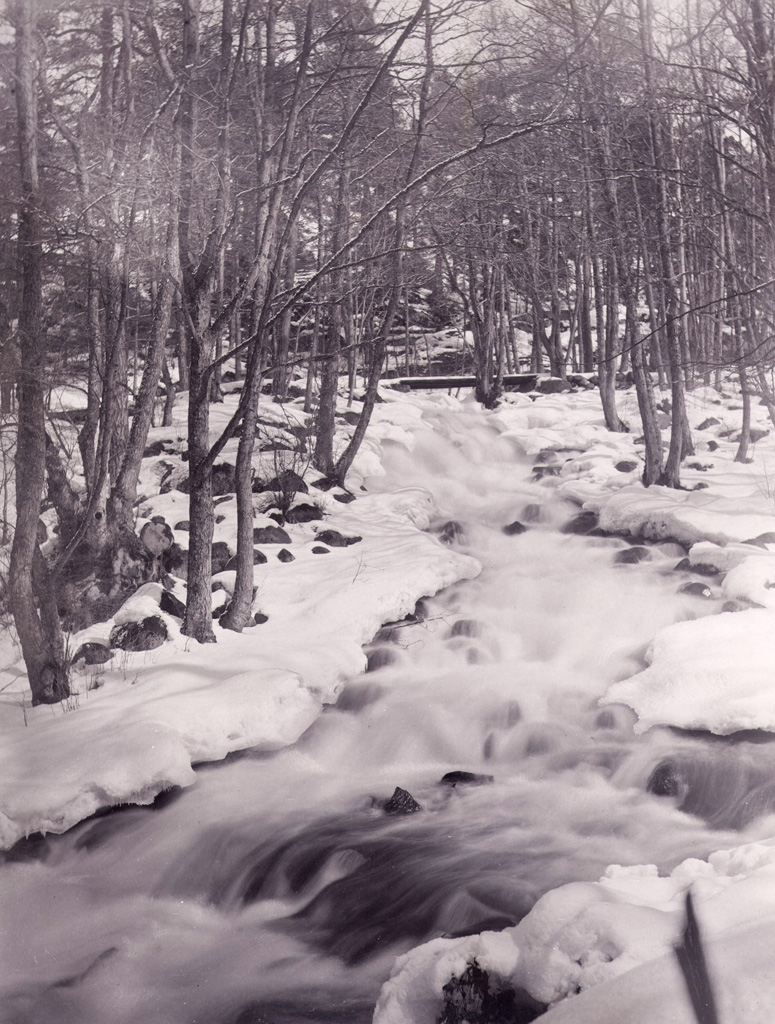
Trollhättan Falls area between Ekeblad's sluice and Polhem's sluice in 1888.

Trollhättan Falls is a waterfall in the Göta river (Göta älv) in Sweden.

The falls starts at Malgö Bridge in central Trollhättan, and has a total height of 32 metres, making up a large part of the 44 metre total fall of the river from Vänern to Kattegat. Before the hydroelectric powerplants were built the discharge of the falls was 900 m³/s, and the falls stretched down to Olidehålan, where the lower part of the fall was called Helvetesfallet ("Hell Falls").

Today the river is allowed through its original course only at special occasions, to regulate the waterlevels of Vänern or as a tourist attraction, such as during the Fallens dagar ("Days of the Waterfalls"), arranged on the third Friday of July every year. The discharge is then 300 m³/s.

Most of the time the falls are used in the hydroelectric powerplants Håjum and Olidan on the eastern banks of the river.
