= Per Kågeson =

Swedish writer

Per Kågeson (born 14 April 1947 in Trollhättan) is a Swedish author, scientist, debater and consultant within the area of environmental protection. During the 1970s and '80s, Kågeson was a leading representative for the opposition of nuclear energy.

== Biography ==
Per Olof Ragnar Kågeson holds a PhD in environment and energy system analysis from the Lund University and is the author of more than 30 books. He was professor in environment system analysis at the Centre for Transport Studies of the Royal Institute of Technology in Stockholm and part-time director of Nature Associates, a small private consultancy.

Kågeson specialized in the cost-efficiency of measures and policies for improving the environmental performance of transport and has done extensive work on emissions trading, vehicle and fuel taxation, fuel efficiency requirements, and the internalization of external costs. Several of his reports and papers deal with the environmental problems of international shipping. He is also the author of books on nuclear power and on the environmental aspects of power production in general.

As president of the European Federation for Transport and Environment (T&E) in 1992, Kågeson started an NGO campaign for making the European Union adopt mandatory fuel efficiency standards for passenger cars, and he has since written many reports, papers and books on this subject. Such standards were finally introduced in Europe in 2008.

In 1998, Kågeson analysed the possibilities for cycle-beating available to the automotive industry. He showed what European legislators needed to do to prevent manufacturers from making a vehicle's computer recognize when the car was driven according to the official test cycle and when used in real traffic. In 2015, it was revealed that the Volkswagen Group had used precisely this type of cycle-beating in more than 11 million vehicles, to allow them much higher emissions of nitrogen oxides when used in real traffic compared to when being driven according to the test cycle.

== Appointments ==
Kågeson was president of the Swedish Writers' Union (1984–1987), member of the Environmental Advisory Council of the Swedish government (1983–1994), president of the European Federation for Transport and Environment (1992–1996) and member of the European Commission's consultative forum on the environment and sustainable development (1997–2001). He is a member of the Royal Swedish Academy of Engineering Sciences.

== Bibliography – selected titles in English ==
- Making Fuel Go Further: A Critical Evaluation of Different Political Instruments for Improving the Fuel Efficiency of New Cars and Other Light Vehicles, Brussels: European Federation for Transport and Environment, T&E 92/6, 1992
- Getting the Prices Right – A European Scheme for Making Transport Pay its True Costs, Brussels: European Federation for Transport and Environment, 1993, ISBN 978-9155877217
- Growth versus the environment – is there a trade-off?, Dordrecht: Kluwer Academic Press, 1998, ISBN 978-94-011-5264-8
- Cycle-Beating and the EU Test Cycle for Cars, Brussels: European Federation for Transport and Environment, 1998
- Electronic Kilometre Charging for Heavy Goods Vehicles in Europe (with Jos Dings), Brussels, European Federation for Transport and Environment, 1999
- The Drive for Less Fuel, Will the motor industry be able to honour its commitment to the European Union?, Brussels: European Federation for Transport and Environment, 2000
- The Impact of CO_{2} Emissions Trading on the European Transport Sector, Stockholm: The Swedish Agency for Innovation Systems, VINNOVA Report VR 2001:17.
- Linking CO_{2} Emissions from International Shipping to the EU Emissions Trading Scheme, Berlin: Umweltbundesamt, 2007
- Tools for Cutting European Transport Emissions. CO_{2} Emissions Trading or Fuel Taxation?, Stockholm: SNS, 2008, ISBN 978-9185695775
- Applying the Principle of Common but Differentiated Responsibility to the Mitigation of Greenhouse Gases from International Shipping. Stockholm: Centre for Transport Studies, CTS Working Paper 2011:5
- Market-based Instruments for NO_{x} Abatement in the Baltic Sea, Brussels: Airclim, EEB and T&E, 2009, ISBN 978-91-975883-6-2
- "Can high speed rail offset its embedded emissions?" (with Jonas Westin). Transportation Research Part D, 17 (2012) 1–7,
