= Erlend Fuglum =

Norwegian politician

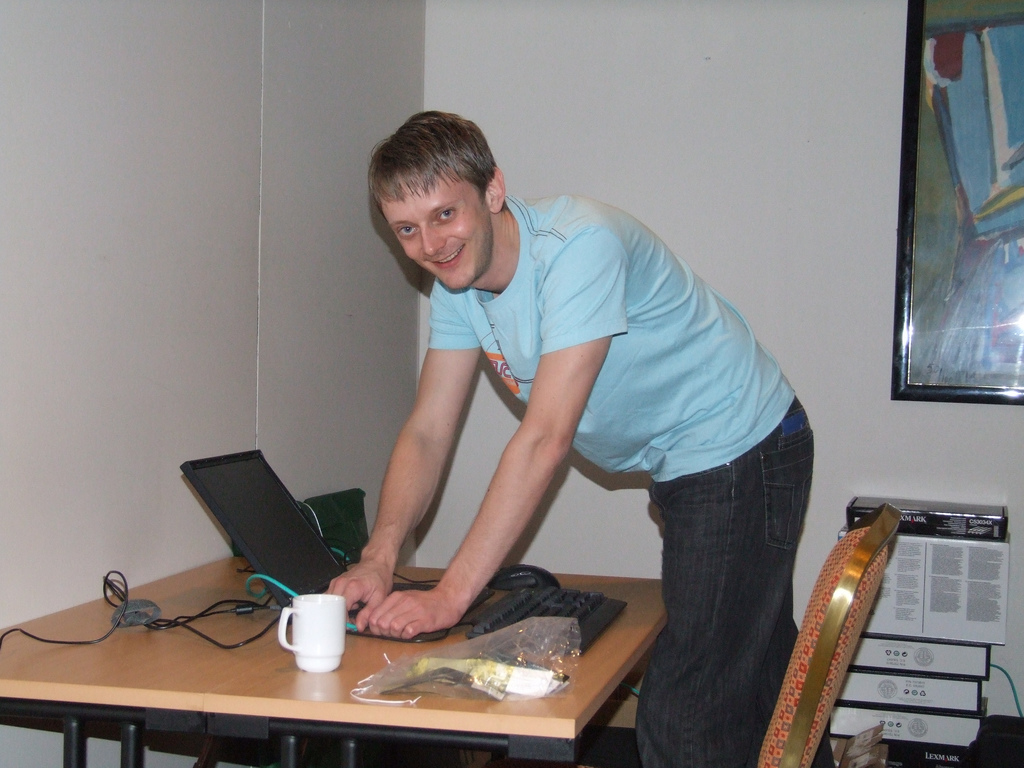
Erlend Fuglum in 2005

Erlend Fuglum (born 13 March 1978) is a Norwegian politician for the Centre Party.

He was born in Namsos Municipality, but served as a member of the municipal council of Grong Municipality from 1999 to 2003. He took a minor in political science at the University of Oslo in 2000 and a bachelor's degree at Vestfold University College in 2003.

From 2004 to 2007 he was the leader of the Centre Youth, the youth wing of the Centre Party, and also the central board member of the Centre Party. In the Centre Party Adult Education Organisation he was a board member from 2007 to 2007 and secretary-general from 2008 to 2010. He was also a board member of the Nordic Association of Adult Education from 2007 to 2009, and a working committee member of No to the EU from 2007 to 2008. From 2010 to 2012 he was employed in First House.

He served as a deputy representative to the Norwegian Parliament from Nord-Trøndelag during the term 2005–2009 and 2009–2013. He has met during 4 days of parliamentary session. In 2012 he was appointed as a State Secretary in the Ministry of Local Government and Regional Development.

Party political offices
Preceded by Trygve Slagsvold Vedum	Leader of Centre Youth; 2004–2007	Succeeded by Christina Ramsøy
