= Ada Arnstad =

Norwegian politician

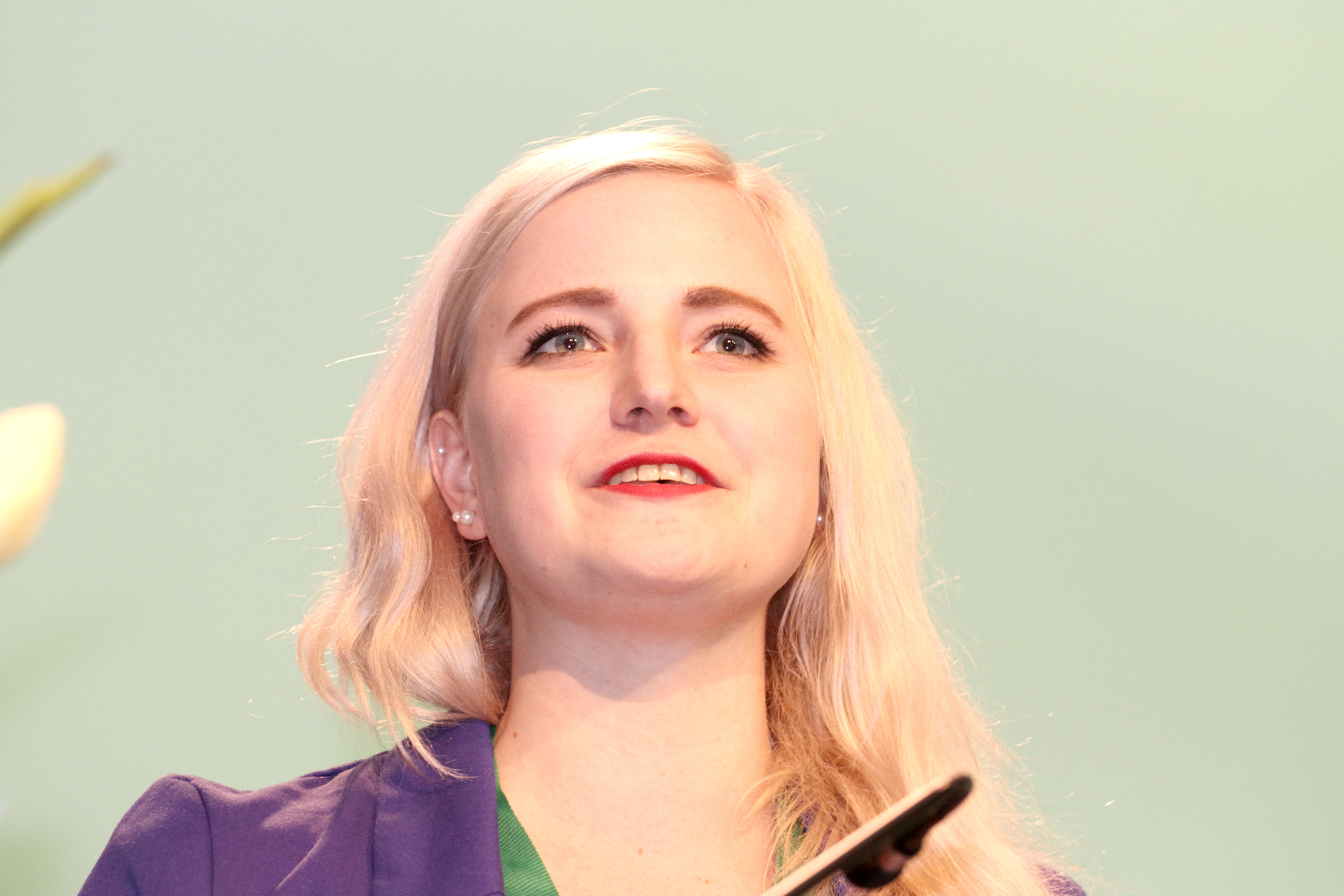
- Arnstad in 2017.

Leader of the Centre Youth
- In office 7 November 2016 – 9 November 2019
- Preceded by: Erling Laugsand
- Succeeded by: Torleik Svelle

Personal details
- Born: 13 August 1992 (age 33) Trollhättan, Sweden
- Parent(s): Eli Arnstad; Iwar Arnstad
- Education: University of Oslo

Ada Arnstad (born 13 August 1992) is a Norwegian politician. She led the Centre Youth from 2016 to 2019.

== Life ==
Arnstad was born in Trollhättan. Her parents were Eli Arnstad and Iwar Arnstad. She was brought up at Skatval in Nord-Trøndelag. Arnstad attended Ole Vig high school before studying Renewable Energy at the University of the Environment and Life Sciences in Ås. Arnstad then studied International Politics at the University of Oslo. Her role model is her grandmother, who served in the Riksdat. Both of her grandmothers, her parents and her aunt are involved in politics and this was part of her training.

Arnstad was president of the Nordic Center Youth Association from 2013 to 2014. After a time as deputy she had led the Senterungdommen who are opposed to the European Union, from November 2016 to November 2019. Arnstad is a strong supporter of positive discrimination to achieve a gender balance in politics. She quotes the adage that we must have an equal number of inept women to match the number of inept men.

In 2021 she became an adviser to Finance Minister Trygve Slagsvold Vedum.
