= Torrgårdsvatten =

Lake in Bohuslän, Sweden

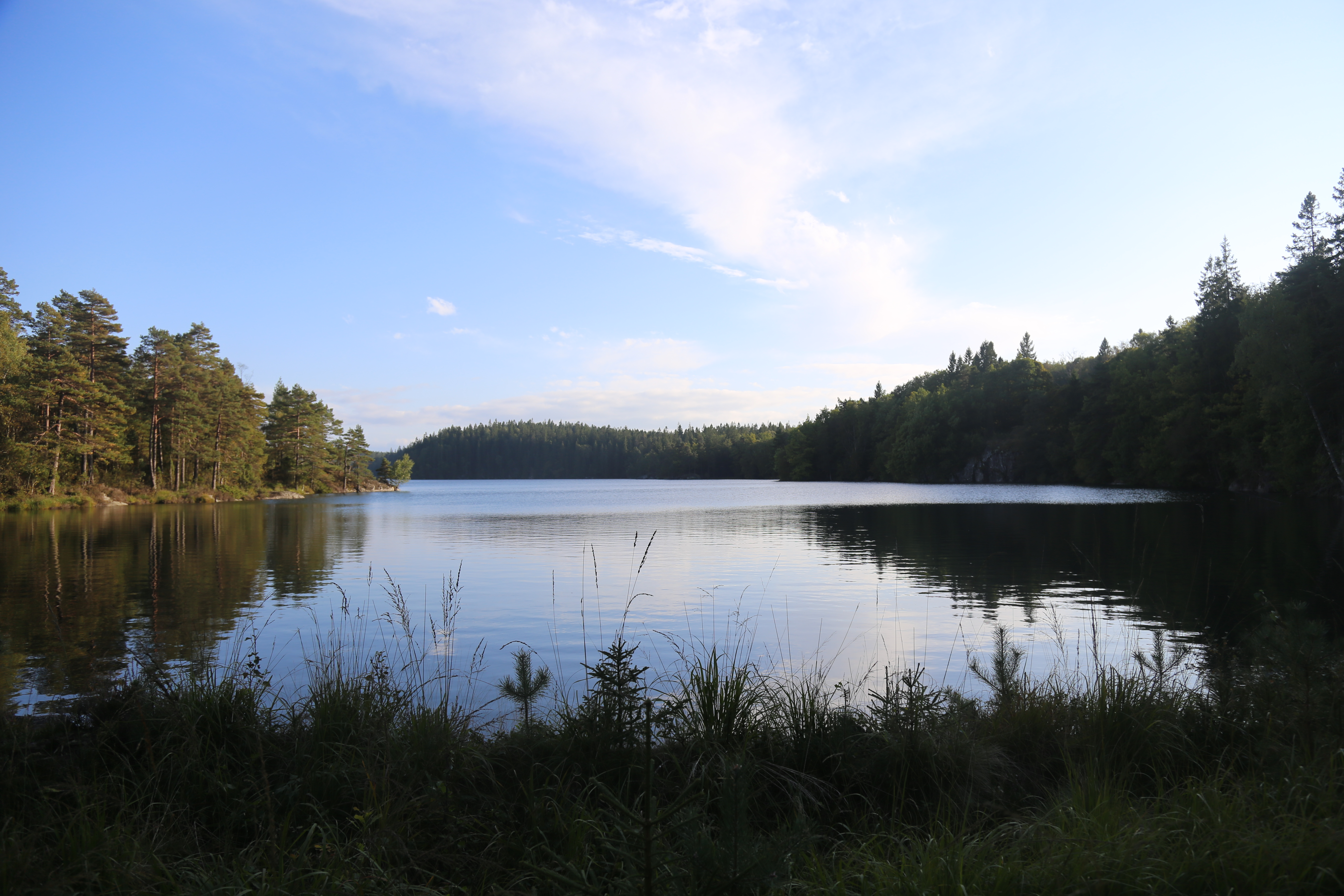
- Interactive map of Torrgårdsvatten
- Location: Sweden
- Coordinates: 58°2′43.26″N 12°3′15.01″E
- Surface area: 0,493 km^{2} (190 sq mi)
- Average depth: 292 m (958 ft)
- Water volume: 3,850,000 km^{3} (923,664 cu mi)
- Shore length^{1}: 4.25 km (2.64 mi)
- Surface elevation: 132.3 m (434 ft)
- ^{1} Shore length is not a well-defined measure.

Torrgårdsvatten is a lake in Lilla Edet Municipality in the province of Bohuslän and is part of the main catchment area of the Göta River. The lake is 29.2 meters deep, has an area of 0.493 square kilometers and has an elevation of 132.3 meters above sea level.

== Sub-catchment area ==
Torrgårdsvatten is part of the sub-basin (644465–128394) that SMHI calls Ovan VDRID = Gårdaån i Göta älvs vattendragsyta. The average elevation is 71 meters above sea level and has an area of 56.96 square kilometers. If the 3,128 upstream catchment areas are included, the accumulated area is 47,638.33 square kilometers. The catchment area's outflow Göta älv empties into the sea. The catchment area consists mostly of forest (61%) and agriculture (15%). The catchment area has 4.47 square kilometers of water surface, giving it a lake percentage of 7.8%. The settlements cover an area of 1.68 square kilometers or 3% of the catchment area.

== History ==
In the 1740s, mill owner Olof Wenngren developed an ironworks for the production of iron and similar products in the village of Thorskog on Göta River. In order to obtain sufficient water for this business, extensive work was carried out in Svartedalen to divert as much water as possible towards Thorskog.

The largest project concerned Torrgårdsvatten. This lake previously had an outlet to the north towards Rödvatten (17 meters difference in altitude), but now a dam was built at the outlet and a half-kilometer long canal was dug ("in rough ground, with considerable work") from the eastern shore of the lake to Helgesjön. From this lake, the water flows in dug ditches towards the similarly dammed Stendammen. The dam in Torrgårdsvatten was, according to the description on the map from 1750, built of earth and stone, 80 meters long, 7 meters high, 22 meters wide at the bottom, and 7 meters wide at the outlet.

In connection with the Berg Collegiate's survey in 1748 (description for the map in 1750), it emerged that the damming of the lake had caused a minor inconvenience for Yttre Åsen, a small meadow had been damaged. Similarly, the Lund homestead north of Rödvattnet had lost water for its mill. Otherwise, no inconvenience had been caused because dams and watercourses were located on undivided outlying land. However, a comparison with the modern map shows that the water level was clearly lower than the current level; for example, the island in the northern part of the lake was still a peninsula.

From description for the map in 1750:

The size and location of the lakes can be seen from the map figure, of which most of the lakes have always supplied their water to Torskogs Bruk, a part, such as Torgårds Watnet, which in the autumn and spring is increased by the 2nd Swarfvareås lakes located there, as well as the many high mountains around, has now in recent times, by means of a dam of earth and stone measuring: B. 136 cubits long, 12 1/2 high, 38 cubits wide at the bottom and 12 cubits wide on top at its outlet, as well as through a canal worked out in rough terrain measuring C. 1005 cubits long, with considerable work has been left to Hälgesjön, which nowadays carries its water through the dug-up ditches to the Stendammen measuring D. of 140 cubits long, 7 wide and 7 high, with a slope to the mountains according to its location; also the Stora Metewatnet, which by means of a dam measuring E. 125 cubits long, through a channel worked out in mountains and rocks measuring F. 190 cubits long is led into Lilla Mete- and Holmewatnet to Kroksjö dam measuring G. 60 cubits long, 15 wide at the bottom, 6 high and 6 wide on top, and then through Kroksjö river to Stendammen measuring D.

The land was distributed between the villages in the 1816 land transfer (with adjustment in 1837). The map shows no noticeable difference from the 1750 map, except that a stream is seen connecting Torrgårdsvatten with Rödvatten (no dam was drawn, but neither was the dam at Stendammen). In 1780 Wenngren had sold the mill, which then had financial problems. This may have led to reduced maintenance of the dam, so water could once again flow to Rödvatten.

During the late 1830s, when the mill was run by J.N. Peterson and J.P. Wedelin, work was undertaken to raise the water level at Torrgårdsvatten by damming the outlet to Rödvatten. There is no indication in the documents that there was any previous dam at this location (a transcript is available in a document from 1939). The owners of the land that was to be flooded were compensated according to an agreement from 1839: The farms in the village of Svenseröd were to receive four riksdaler per year for each whole homestead, while Yttre Åsen was to receive a barrel of so-called meat salt every year, both agreements were to apply "for everlasting times". The owner of the Lund homestead in Ucklum socken, whose mill was powered by water from Rödvatten, was also compensated. In 1841 the work was completed, but the water level had risen more than the landowners had anticipated. For this reason, the surveyor Carl S. Jung was called in to map the lake when the ice had settled in January 1842 (the water level was then 1.2 meters below the upper edge of the dam). The result was 38.1 hectares, which Jung compared with the 1816 map: the lake had grown by 7.2 hectares. The flooded area was "cultivated forest land on bedrock and partly of marshes and seagulls with some smaller grass slopes to Yttre Åsen". The southern end of the lake had been moved about 160 meters to the south, and the peninsula in the northern part of the lake was also cut off and is now an island. In connection with the negotiations, a complaint was also received from the owner of the Röd homestead with a saw that received its water from Rödvatten. This saw had received less water when the connection between Torrgårdsvatten and Rödvatten was severed. On June 9, 1842, the decision was made in which the previous agreements with Svenseröd and Yttre Åsen were declared reasonable while the demands of Röd were rejected.

The Torrgårdsvatten dam and the canal to Helgesjön are still visible.

== Gallery ==
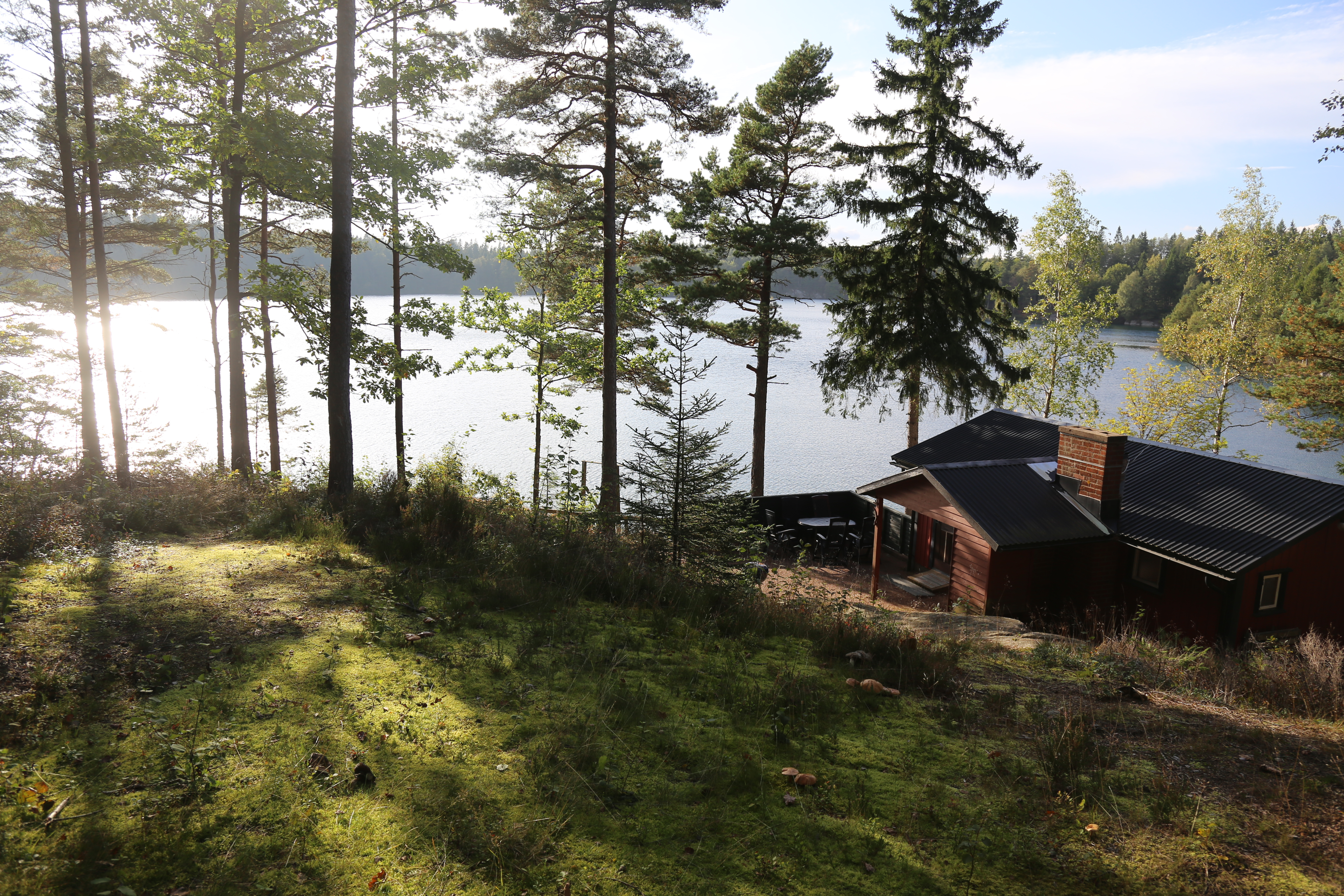
Summer cottages by the eastern shore of Torrgårdsvatten.

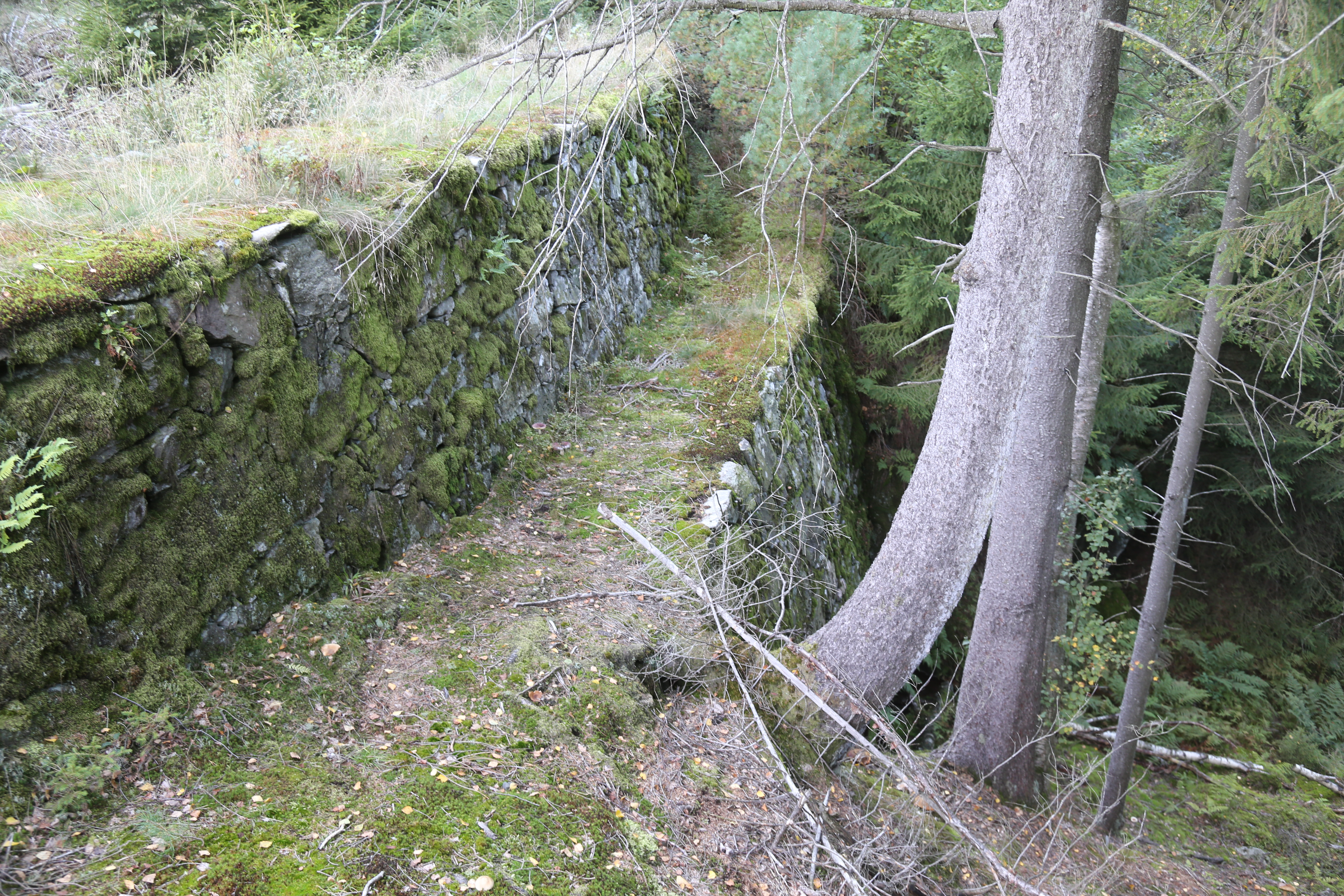
The dam in the northern part of the lake.

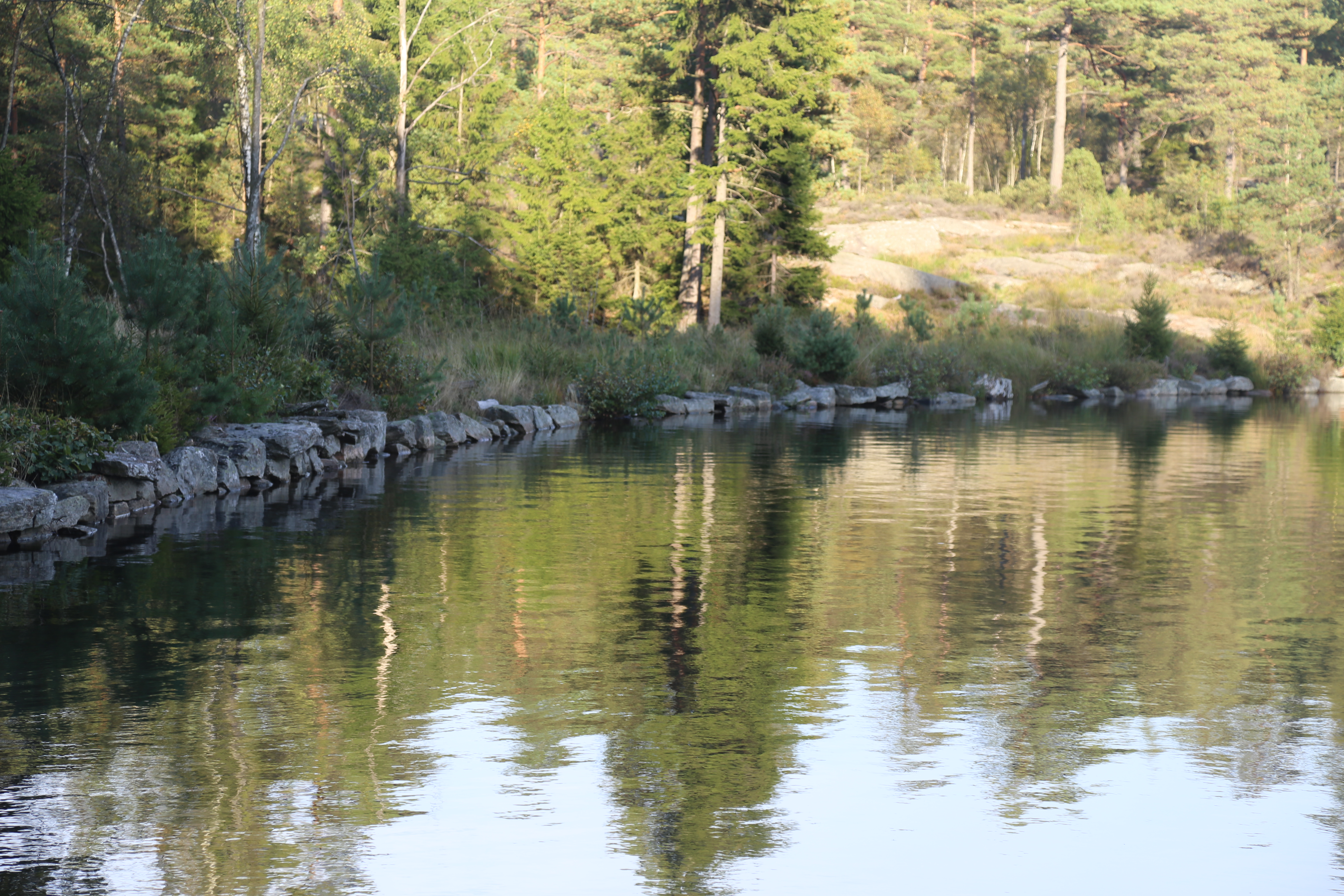
The dam from the lakeside.

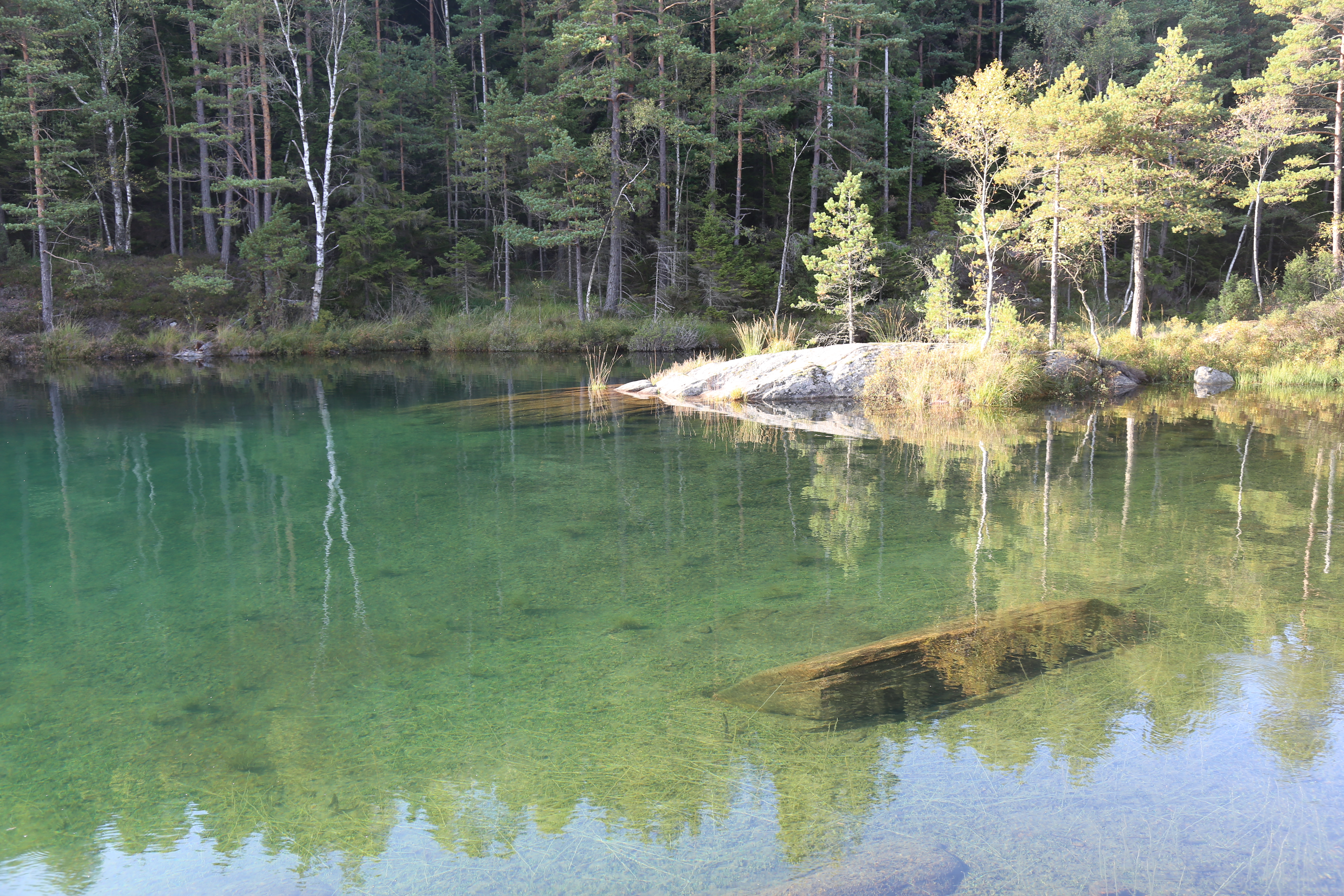
The bay in the northeast of the lake.
