= Christina Ramsøy =

Norwegian politician

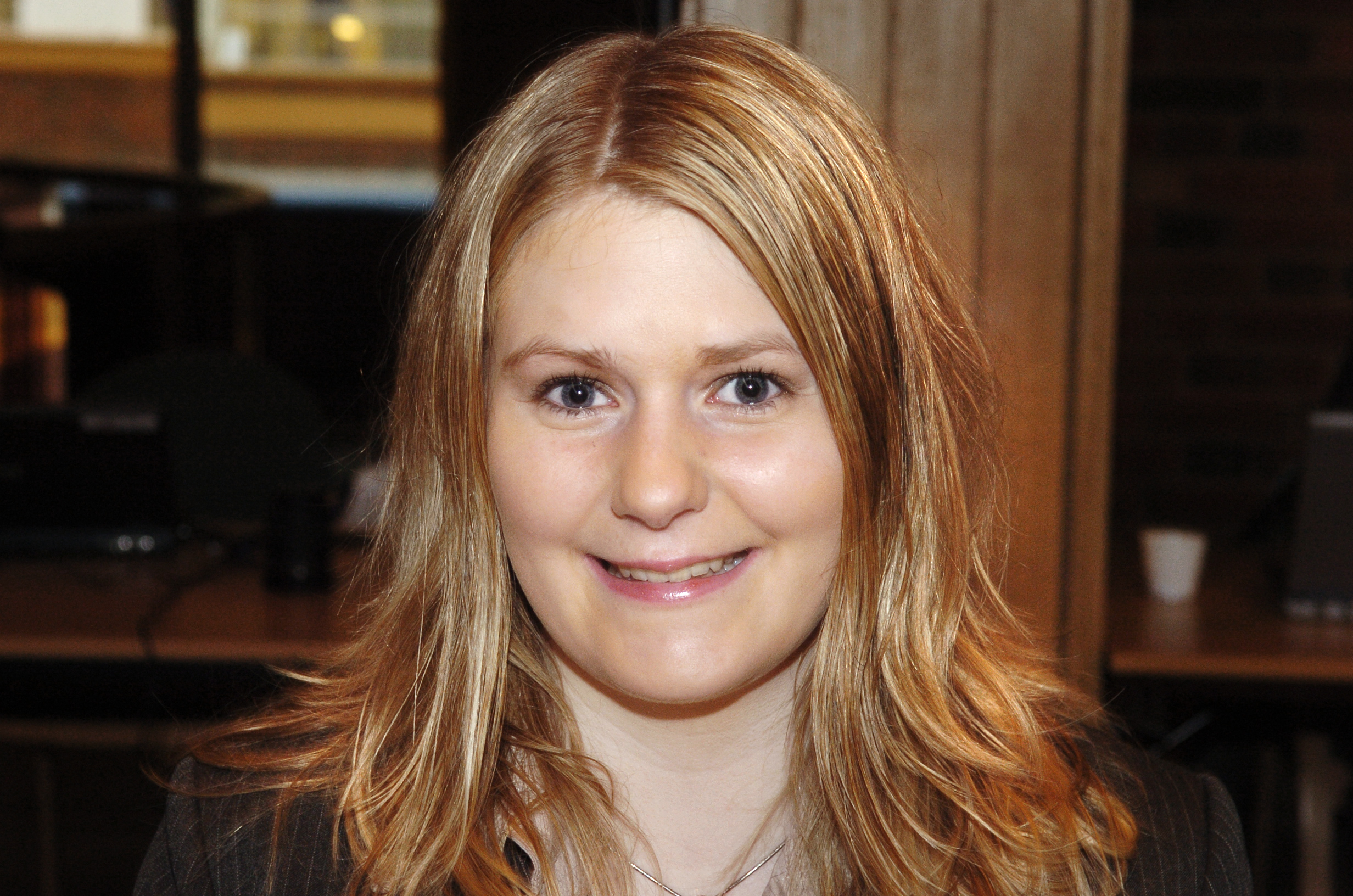
Christina Ramsøy

Christina Nilsson Ramsøy (born 4 November 1986) is a Norwegian politician for the Centre Party.

She was born in Steinkjer Municipality, and finished secondary school there in 2005. The then studied for two years in Trondheim. She was elected to both the municipal council of Steinkjer Municipality and Nord-Trøndelag county council in 2007. She served one year in the municipal council and the whole four-year term in the county council. She was also the leader of the Centre Youth, the youth wing of the Centre Party, from 2007 to 2009, having chaired the county chapter from 2003 to 2007 and been a central board member from 2006 to 2007.

In the 2009 Norwegian parliamentary election she was elected as a deputy representative to the Parliament of Norway from Nord-Trøndelag. As regular representative Lars Peder Brekk was a cabinet member, she was promoted to a full member of Parliament. She was a member of the Standing Committee on Family and Cultural Affairs. This tenure ended in June 2012, when Brekk returned to Parliament.

Party political offices
Preceded by Erlend Fuglum	Leader of Centre Youth; 2007–2009	Succeeded by Johannes Rindal
