= Johannes Rindal =

Norwegian politician

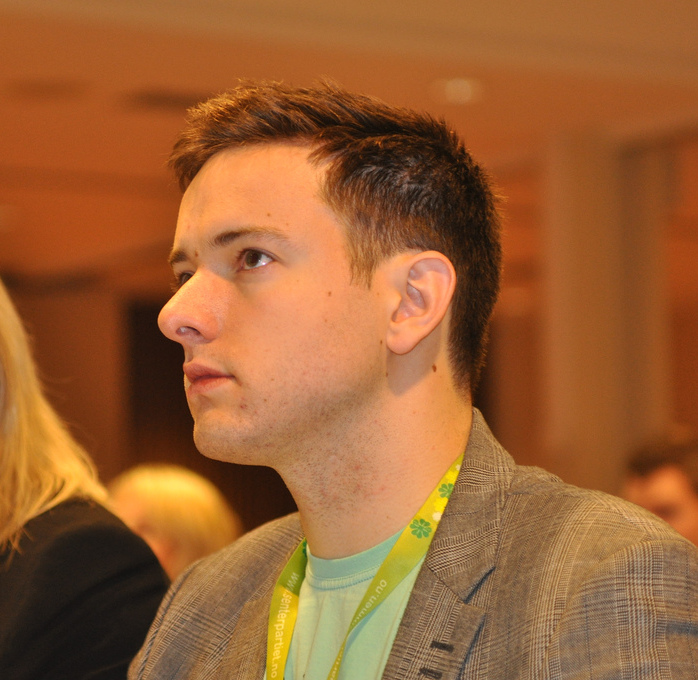

Personal details
- Born: 22 February 1984 (age 41); Dovre, Norway
- Political party: Centre Party

Johannes Rindal (born 22 February 1984 in Dovre) is a Norwegian politician for the Centre Party.

He served as a deputy representative to the Norwegian Parliament from Oppland during the term 2005–2009.

On the local level he has been a member of the municipal council for Dovre Municipality.

He was the leader of the Centre Youth from 2009 to 2011.

Party political offices
Preceded by Christina Ramsøy	Leader of Centre Youth; 2009–2011	Succeeded by Sandra Borch
