= Centre Youth =

Norwegian political organization

Norwegian Centre Party Youth Senterungdommen
- Leader: Andrine Hanssen-Seppola
- Founded: 1949
- Headquarters: Akergata 51, 0159, Oslo
- Ideology: Decentralisation; Euroscepticism
- Mother party: Centre Party
- International affiliation: The European Alliance of EU-critical Movements (observer)
- Nordic affiliation: Nordic Center Youth
- Website: Official Website

The Centre Youth (Senterungdommen or SUL) is the youth organization of the Norwegian Centre Party. Hence, they advocate decentralisation and stress their opposition of the European Union. Since 2022, the organization has been led by Andrine Hanssen-Seppola, from Tromsø.

== Leaders ==
- Nils Forren (2024-present)
- Andrine Hanssen-Seppola (2022-2024
- Torleik Svelle (2019–2022)
- Ada Arnstad (2016–2019)
- Erling Laugsand (2013–2016)
- Sandra Borch (2011–2013)
- Johannes Rindal (2009–2011)
- Christina Ramsøy (2007–2009)
- Erlend Fuglum (2004–2007)
- Trygve Slagsvold Vedum (2002–2004)
- Anne Beathe Kristiansen (2000–2002)
- Sigbjørn Gjelsvik (1998–2000)
