= Trollhättan =

City in Västergötland, Sweden

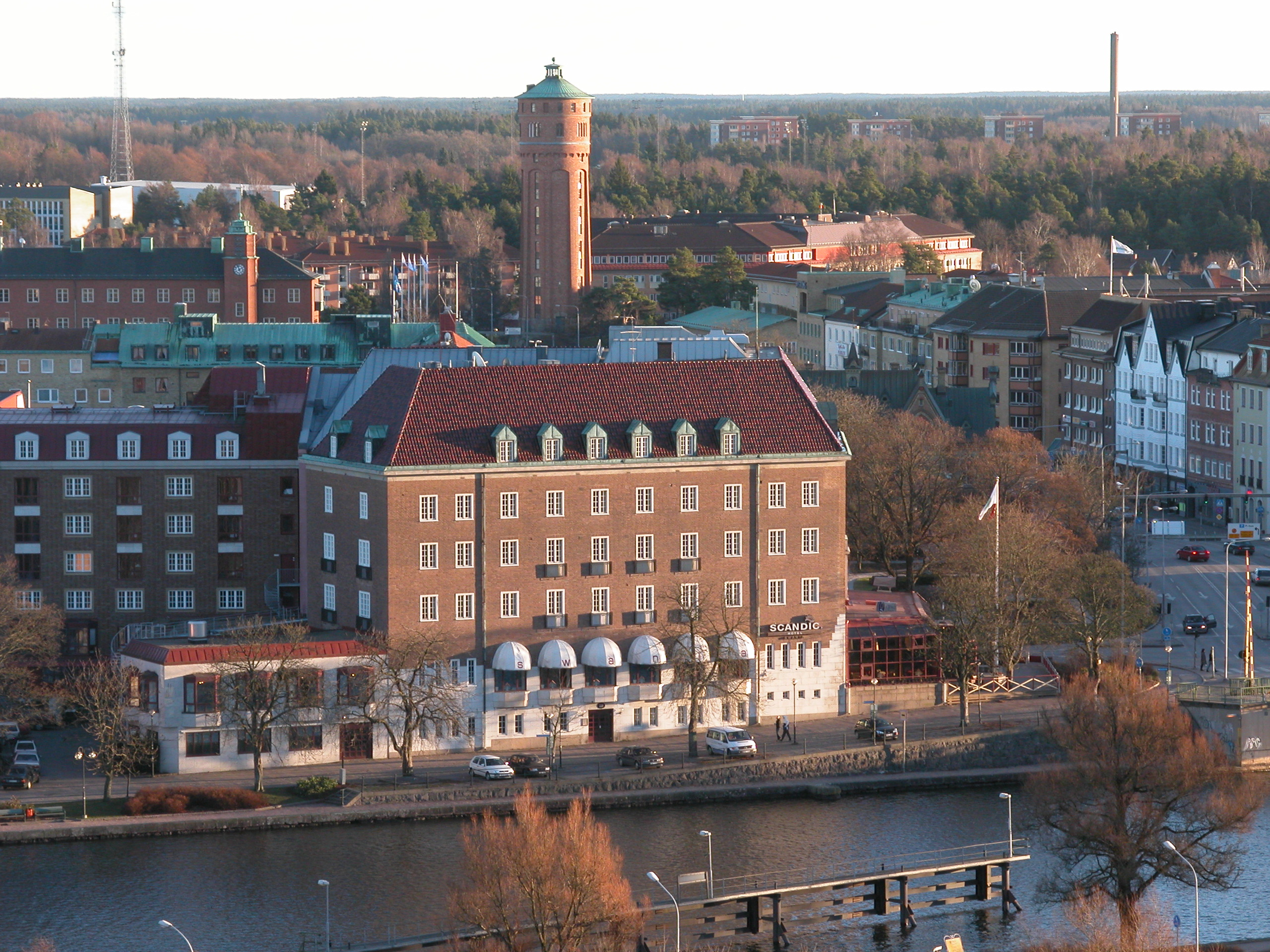
- The Göta älv river and Trollhättan Water Tower in central Trollhättan

- Location within Västra Götaland Location within Sweden
- Coordinates: 58°16′58″N 12°17′21″E
- Country: Sweden
- Province: Västergötland
- County: Västra Götaland County
- Municipality: Trollhättan Municipality

Area
  - Total: 23.78 km^{2} (9.18 sq mi)

Population (2023)
  - Total: 50,069
  - Density: 1,802/km^{2} (4,670/sq mi)
- Time zone: UTC+1 (CET)
  - Summer (DST): UTC+2 (CEST)
- Website: www.trollhattan.se

Trollhättan (Swedish pronunciation: [ˈtrɔ̂lːˌhɛtːan]) is the 23rd-largest city in Sweden, the seat of Trollhättan Municipality, Västra Götaland County. It is situated by Göta älv, near the lake Vänern, and has a population of approximately 50,000 in the city proper. It is located 75 km (46 mi) north of Sweden's second-largest city, Gothenburg.

== History ==
Trollhättan was granted city rights (which today have no legal effect) in 1916 at which time it had about 15,000 inhabitants, now grown to 59,058. Trollhättan was founded on the river Göta älv, at the Trollhättan Falls. The site was first mentioned in literature from 1413. Trollhättan had a strategic significance on the road between Västergötland and Norway. It was also of a commercial and political significance for shipping to and from Vänern.

Utilization of the river falls was the first important business activity in the area. From the Middle Ages milling and sawing operations have been conducted where the city center is now located. For centuries, Trollhättan Falls was an obstacle for boats travelling the river, until a lock system was completed in the 19th century. In 1795 the English writer Mary Wollstonecraft visited Trollhattan on her trip through Sweden, Norway and Denmark. She described in one of her letters her observations of the canal under construction, and the falls. It has since been updated several times, and the present locks were finished in 1916. In the late 19th century, hydropower was developed in Trollhättan. The Swedish energy corporation Vattenfall took its name from the falls in Trollhättan. Today the city has two operational hydropower stations, Olidan and Hojum. Trollhättan is also home of King Oscars Bridge, for a long time one of Sweden's biggest tourist attractions, owing to its impressive views of the Trollhättan Falls.

On 22 October 2015, a mass stabbing occurred at Kronan School, a high school.

== Name ==
The name Trollhättan itself was originally used only for the falls area. The name Trollhättan is translated as "troll's bonnet". The latter part "hätta" could also mean mountain top. The water that splashed from a large rock at the bottom of the waterfall (before the hydro dam was built) was imagined to look like a troll's hat. Other former names of the site are Eiðar and Stora Edet; the latter lives on in the name of the south-bordering municipality of Lilla Edet.

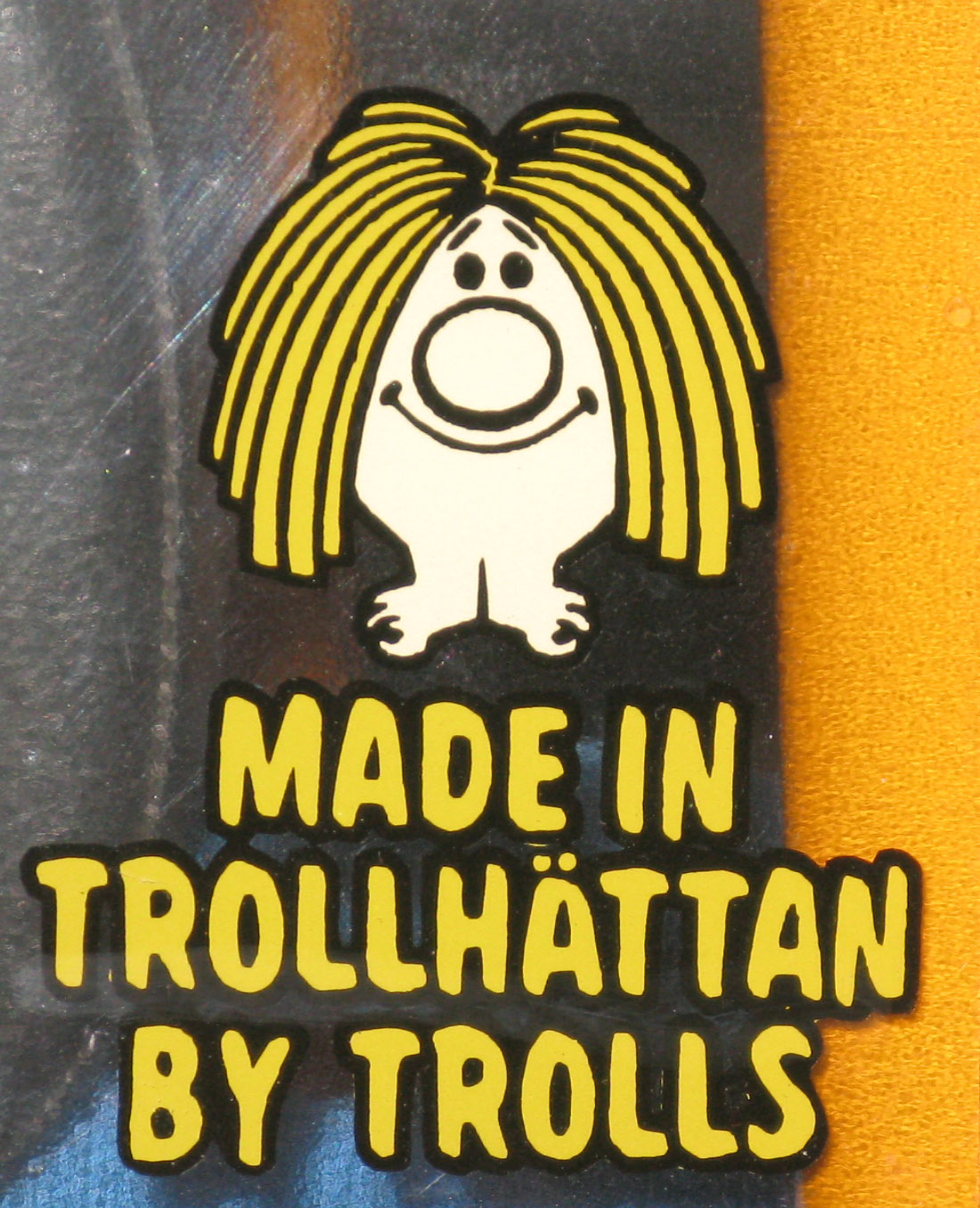
Sticker on Saab car window

== Industry ==
The manufacturing company Nydqvist & Holm AB (now NOHAB) was based in the city of Trollhättan dating from 1847. Further industries quickly followed. Dating from the 19th century, Trollhättan formerly housed the headquarters and main production plant of Saab Automobile and subsequently the headquarters and a production plant of National Electric Vehicle Sweden (NEVS). It also has a number of industrial facilities, headed by GKN Aerospace (previously known as Volvo Aero) and its contractual suppliers. As with parallel locations elsewhere in Europe, much of its production has moved from heavy industry to professional services and the creation of intellectual property.

As of 2011, Trollhättan hosts a film production complex known as Trollywood; movies shot there include Show Me Love (Fucking Åmål), Dancer in the Dark, Melancholia, Dogville and studio scenes for Lilya 4-ever. The movie studio Film i Väst centered here produces about half of the Swedish feature-length films.

== Trollhätte Canal ==
During the 17th century, work on a system of locks began and the first lock was completed around 1607 at Lilla Edet. During the 18th century several unsuccessful attempts were made to complete the locks. In 1718 a contract was signed by the government and Christopher Polhem (1661–1751) for construction of a canal between Kattegatt and Lake Vänern and from Vättern to the Baltic Sea. Trollhätte Canal first begun construction in 1718. In 1800, Baltzar von Platen (1766–1829) completed the locks. Larger locks were later built under Nils Ericson (1802–1870). The further construction of the Göta Canal enabled larger boats to pass through Trollhätte Canal.

== Trollhättan Church ==
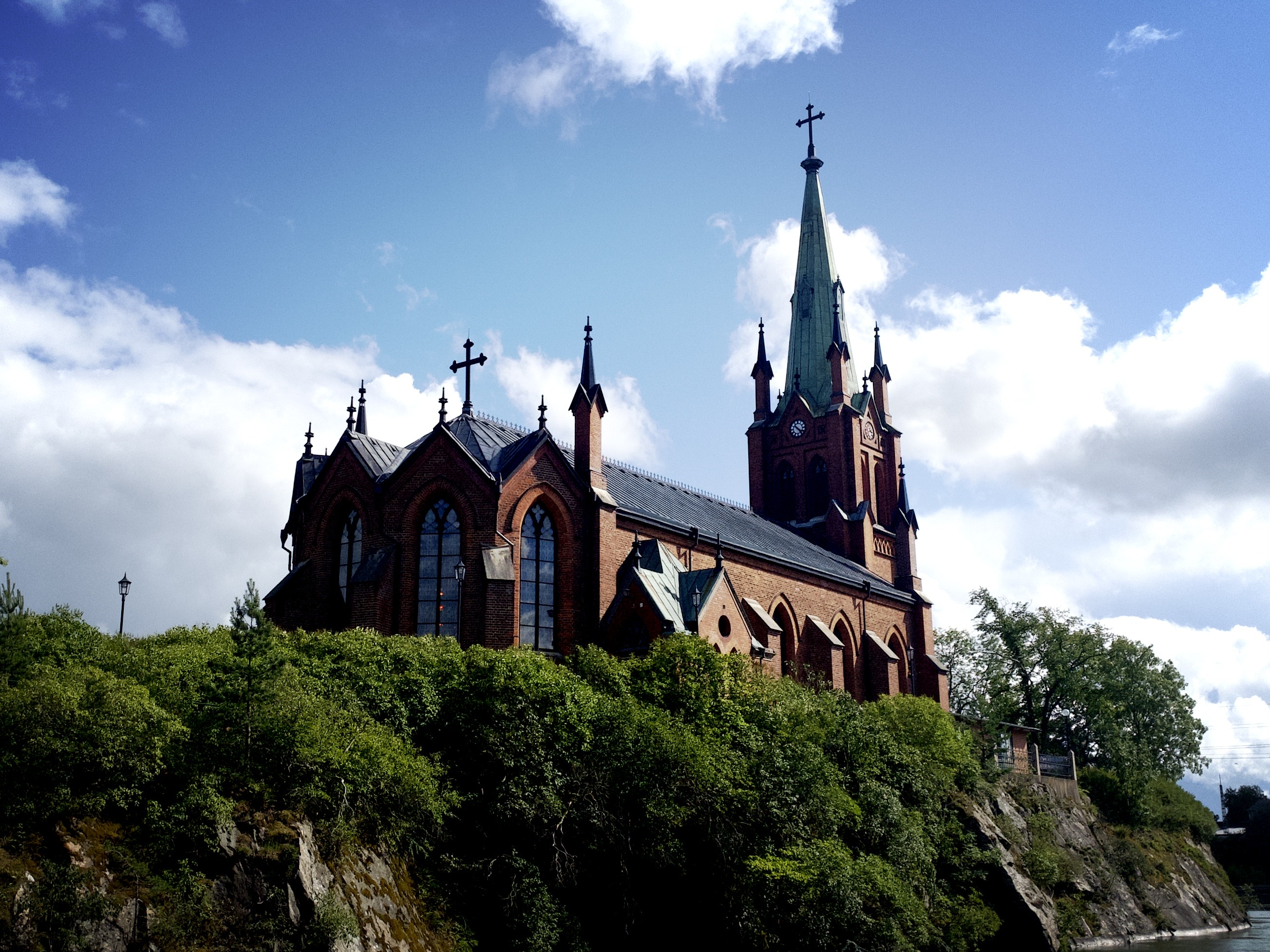
Trollhättan Church in 2013

Trollhättan Church (Trollhättans Kyrka) belongs to the Trollhättan congregation in the Diocese of Skara. Between 1860 and 1862, the New Trollhätte Canal Company (Nya Trollhätte Kanalbolag) built Trollhättan church. It was inauguration in 1862 and was handed over to the congregation as a gift. The church is erected in a neo-Gothic style after drawings by architect Adolf W. Edelsvärd (1824–1919). It consists of a longhouse with a north–south orientation. To the south is the tower with main entrance and to the north is a polygonal cairn. It is located on a cliff in the Göta River in the middle of the canal system.

At the expense of the canal company, a sacristy was built in the north-west in 1896–1897 with a rise to the pulpit, and the same year came glass paintings designed by Folke Zettervall (1862–1955). The window paintings in the choir, which was installed in 1962, are done by artist Ralph Bergholtz (1908-1988). The church was restored in 1983–84 with Jerk Alton as architect.

== Transport ==
=== Highways and Major Roads ===
Coming from Gothenburg in the south, the European Route E45 passes through central Trollhättan on its way northward through the country. In an interchange in northern Trollhättan, the E45 joins with the national road 44 which comes from Götene in the east. The two roads then share routes as they pass over Göta Älv and through the Överby Shopping Center before they separate and the 44 continues westward toward Uddevalla. National road 42 starts in an interchange with the 44, roughly four kilometres east of Trollhättan, and continues southeast toward Borås.

=== Bus ===
Due to the proximity of the two cities, Trollhättan shares a city bus network with Vänersborg, making travel between the cities efficient. The largest bus station in Trollhättan is located right next to the train station.

=== Train ===
Trollhättan Central Station is part of the Norway/Vänern Line. Most trains between Gothenburg and Oslo stop at the station.

=== Air ===
The city is served by Trollhättan–Vänersborg Airport, it is located 5 km (3 mi) northeast of Trollhättan. The airport provides direct routes to Stockholm and Sälen which are operated by NyxAir formerly Västflyg. The nearest international airport is Göteborg Landvetter Airport, which is located 97 km (60 mi) south of Trollhättan.

== Sports ==
Trollhättan hosted Division B of the 2017 Bandy World Championship. The following sports clubs are located in Trollhättan:

- IFK Trollhättan
- FC Trollhättan
- Skoftebyns IF
- Gripen Trollhättan BK

== Gallery ==
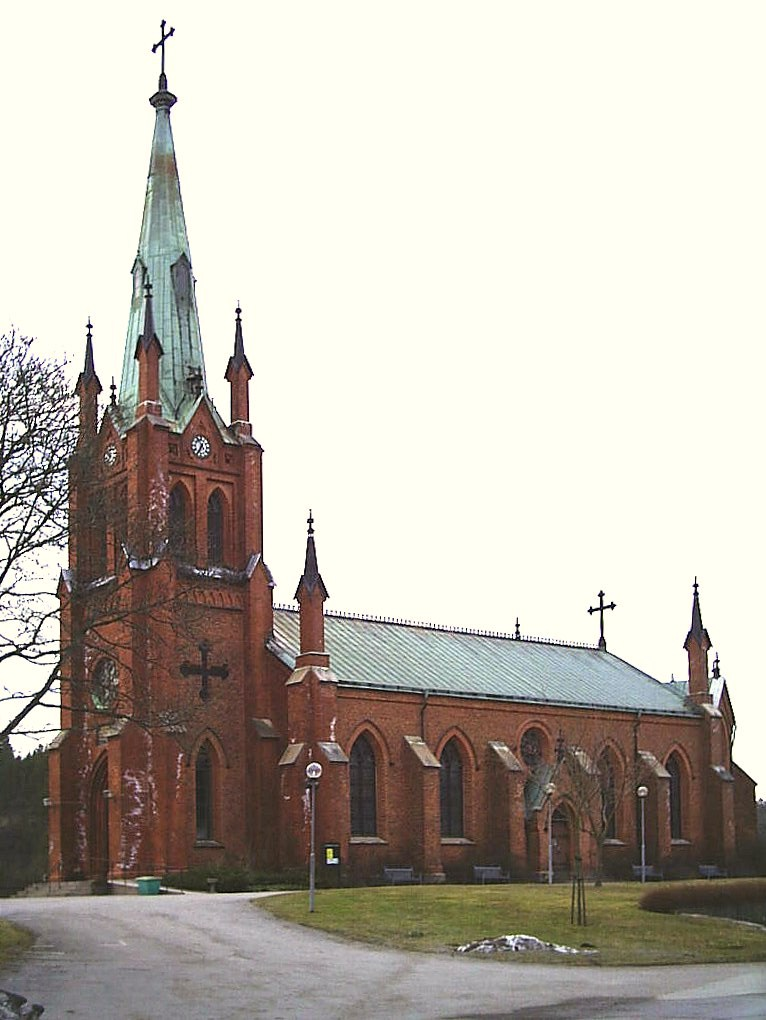
Trollhättan Church

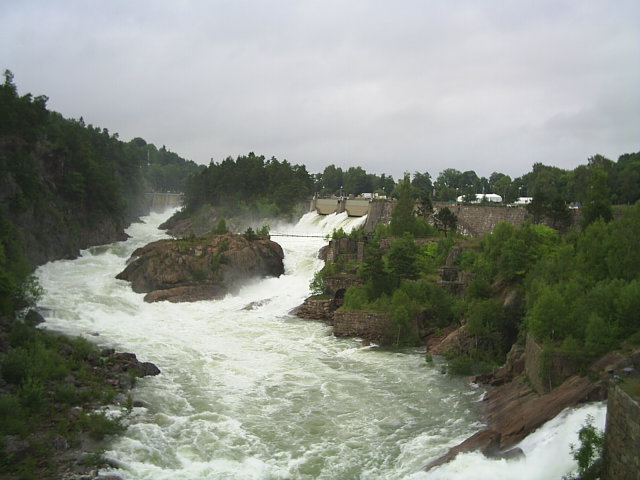
Trollhättan Falls

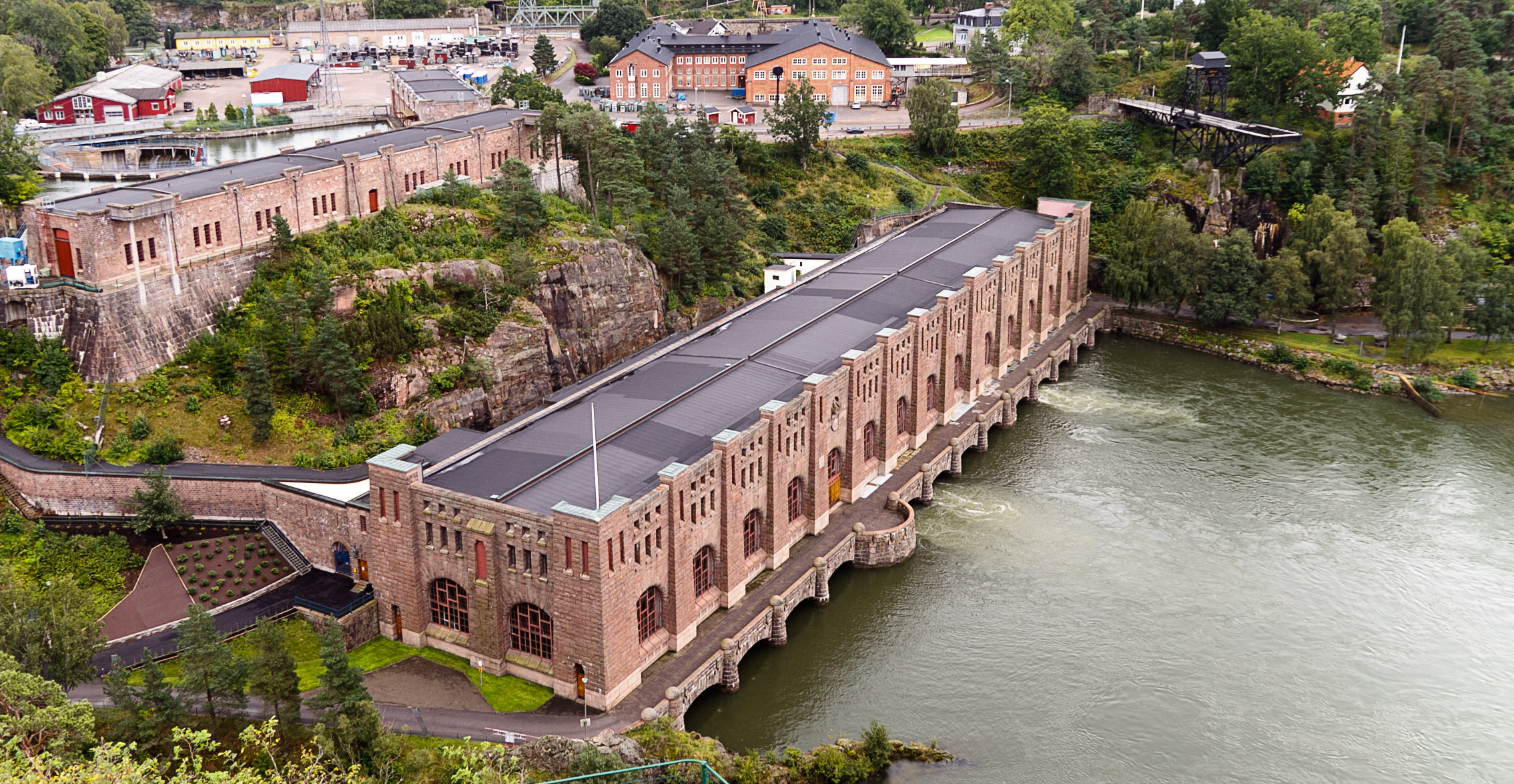
Olidan Hydropower Station

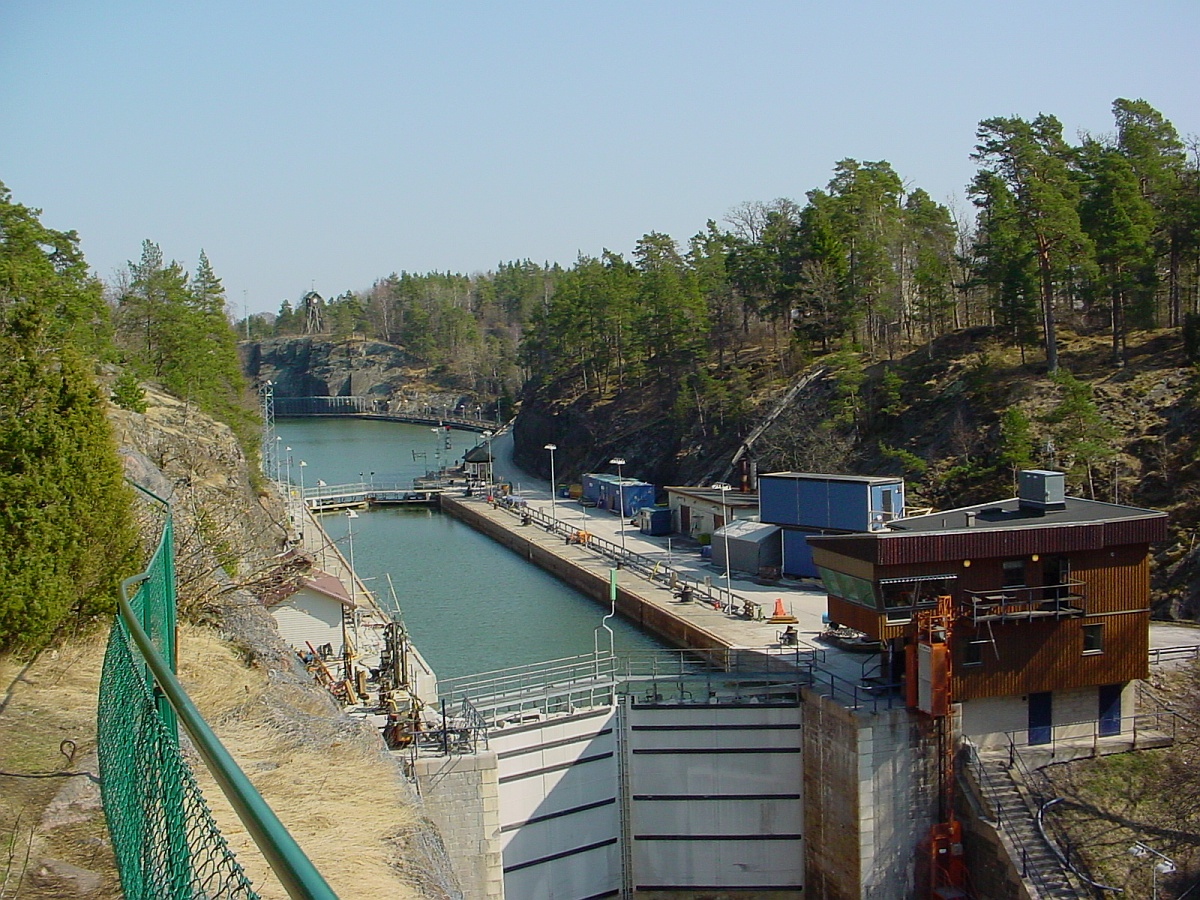
Trollhättan Canal

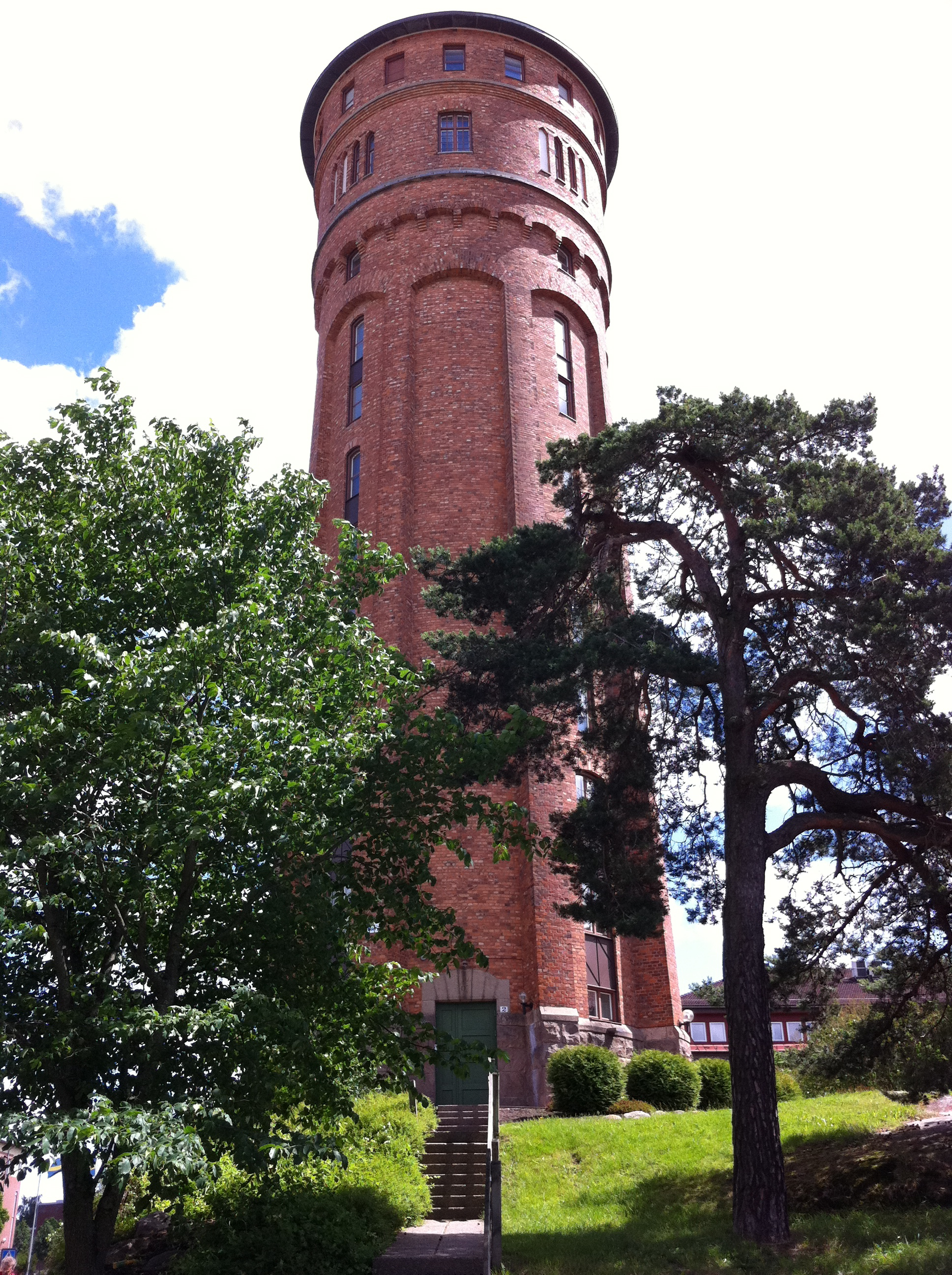
Trollhättan Water Tower

== Notable people ==
- Alexis Ahlgren - long distance runner
- Rune Almén - high jumper
- Arne Andersson - runner
- Frank Andersson - wrestler and entertainer
- Gustaf Andersson - footballer
- Jessica Andersson - singer/songwriter
- Johan Andersson - artist
- Bertil Antonsson - wrestler
- Hans Antonsson - wrestler
- Ada Arnstad - Norwegian politician
- Rebin Asaad - footballer
- Lennart Bengtsson - meteorologist
- Anna Björk - actress
- Benjamin Björklund - painter
- Erik Carlsson - rally driver
- Dan Corneliusson - footballer
- Erik Dahlin - footballer
- Johan Dahlin - footballer
- Rasmus Dahlin - ice hockey player
- Anders Eriksson - comedian
- Claes Eriksson - entertainer and actor
- Christofer Erixon - composer and music producer
- Linus Fagemo - ice hockey player
- Kim Fransson - singer/songwriter
- Kerstin Granlund - comedian and actress
- Sven Haglund - sport shooter
- Per Jonsson - paralympian
- Per Kågeson - scientist and author
- Anton Kurochkin - footballer
- Marjut Heinonen - Finnish sports shooter
- Simon Hedlund - footballer
- Arne Hülphers - jazz pianist
- Robin Jansson - footballer
- Jay-Jay Johanson - singer/songwriter
- Jakob Johansson - footballer
- Jan Karlsson - wrestler
- Kristian Karlsson - table tennis player
- Per Kågeson- author and scientist
- Tuomo Könönen - Finnish footballer
- Pernilla Larsson - football referee
- Peter LeMarc - singer/songwriter
- Jan Lööf - illustrator and author
- Håkan Mild - footballer
- Viktor Morozov - Russian footballer
- Peter Nyborg - tennis player
- Clark Olofsson - criminal
- Tom Pettersson - footballer
- Nils van der Poel - speed skater
- Paul Sahlin - singer/songwriter
- Rolf Santesson - lichenologist
- Gitta-Maria Sjöberg - operatic soprano
- Jayne Svenungsson - theologian and philosopher
- David Urwitz - singer and musician
- Janne Wallenius - reactor physicist
- Ulla Westermark - numismatist
- Simon Westlund - speedcuber
- Jigs (band) - band
- Lord Belial - black metal band

== See also ==
- Saab Car Museum
- Trollhättan Mosque
- University College West
