= Hojum Hydroelectric Power Station =

Hydroelectric power station in Trollhättan, Sweden

Coordinates: 58°16.8′N 12°16.7′E

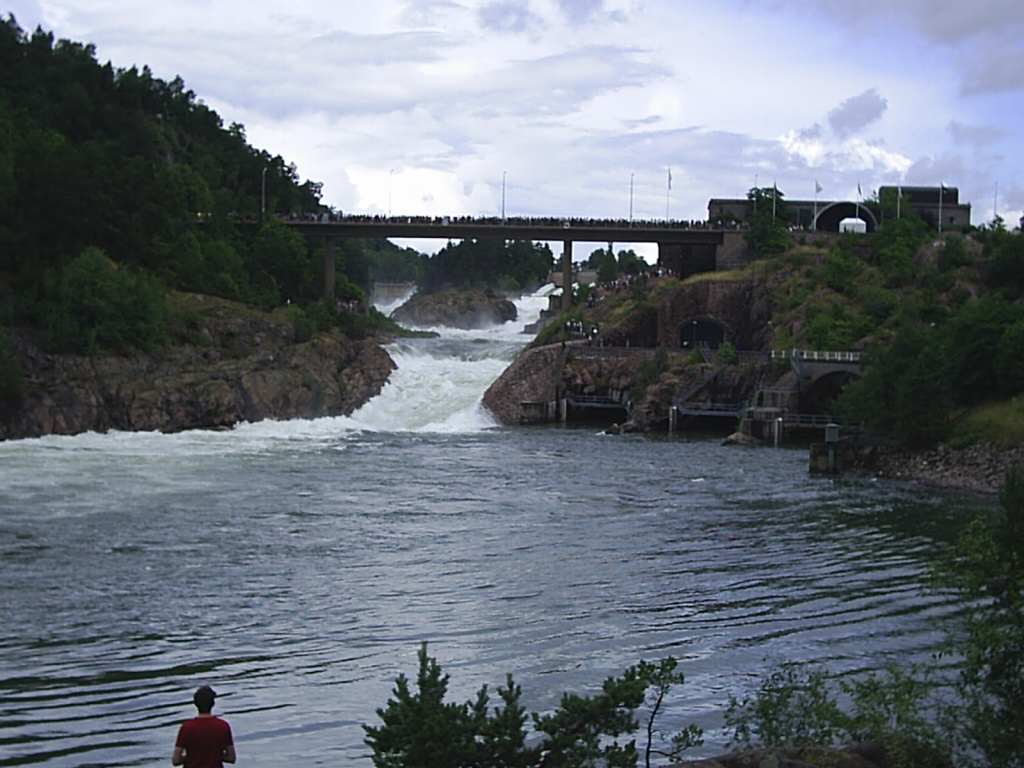
Downstream view of the waterfalls and the Håjum power station

Hojum Power Station (alt. Håjum Power Station) is the second hydroelectric power station in Trollhättan, the first one being the older Olidan Power Station. While the first two turbines were taken into service in 1938, a third one was built and started in 1992. The first two are rated at 50 MW, while the third is rated at 70 MW.

The station is mainly located underground in a large mountain hall. This design was chosen because of the political instability in Europe at the time, which later led to the second world war. The relatively small building above ground was drawn by the Swedish architect Erik Hahr.
