= Göta älv =

River in Sweden

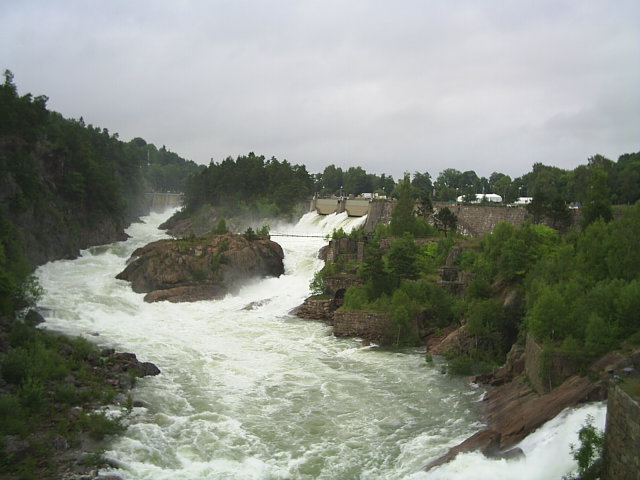
- Trollhättan Falls in Göta älv in July 2004

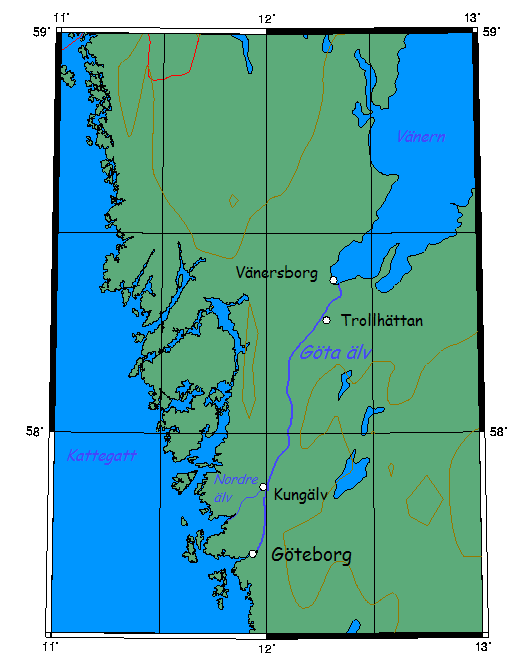
- Position of the Göta älv

Location
- Country: Sweden

Physical characteristics
- Source: Vänern
  - coordinates: 58°22′49″N 12°21′30″E
  - elevation: 44 m (144 ft)
- Mouth: Kattegat
  - location: Gothenburg
  - coordinates: 57°41′35″N 11°54′30″E
  - elevation: 0 m (0 ft)
- Length: 93 km (58 mi)^{1}
- Basin size: 50,229.3 km^{2} (19,393.6 sq mi)
- Discharge
  - average: 575 m^{3}/s (20,300 cu ft/s)

Basin features
- Designation

Ramsar Wetland
- Official name: Nordre älvs estuarium
- Designated: 14 November 2001
- Reference no.: 1125
- 1: 720 km including Klarälven and Vänern

The Göta älv (Swedish pronunciation: [ˈjø̌ːta ˈɛlːv]; "River of (the) Geats") is a river that drains lake Vänern into the Kattegat, at the city of Gothenburg, on the western coast of Sweden. It was formed at the end of the last glaciation, as an outflow channel from the Baltic Ice Lake to the Atlantic Ocean and nowadays it has the largest drainage basin in Scandinavia.

The Göta älv is located in Götaland, with the river itself being a site of early Geatish settlement. Its length is 93 km (58 mi). The Bohus Fortress is located by the river at Kungälv. There the river splits into two, with the northern part being the Nordre älv and the southern part keeping the name Göta älv; the two arms of the river enclose the island of Hisingen.

At Trollhättan there is a dam, canal locks and a hydropower station in the river. The locks make the river navigable, even for large cargo vessels (88 m [289 ft] long). The artificial parts are called Trollhätte Canal. The river and the canal is part of a mostly inland waterway, Göta Canal, which spans the width of Sweden to the Baltic Sea south of Stockholm.

The power station supplied electric power to the heavy steel industry concentrated around Trollhättan Falls, contributing to its Industrial Revolution. In the summer months the spillway of the dam is opened for a few minutes daily and tourists gather to see the water rushing down the river (picture).

There are concerns about whether the maximum permitted discharge of 1,000 m^{3}/s (35,000 cu ft/s) is enough in a scenario where heavy rain floods the lake Vänern, causing considerable damage. Previously this was thought not to be possible in reality, but in 2001 the lake was flooded almost 1 m (3 ft) above maximum level (and some upstream lakes like Glafsfjorden flooded 3 m [10 ft]). In this situation, Göta älv was allowed a discharge of 1,100 m^{3}/s (39,000 cu ft/s) for months causing a big risk of landslides. Now a water tunnel between Vänersborg and Uddevalla is considered as a rescue solution.

There is a large risk of landslides along the river and historical records of 15 landslides exist. The largest occurred in the years 1150, 1648, 1950, 1957 and 1977 (Tuve landslide).

== Name in other languages ==
In Old Norse the river was called the Gautelfr; in Icelandic it is Gautelfur; and in Norwegian it is sometimes rendered as Gøtelv.

== See also ==
- Name of the Goths
- Yngen lake
- Torrgårdsvatten
