= Olidan Hydroelectric Power Station =

Hydroelectric power station in Sweden

Coordinates: 58.2742°N 12.2722°E

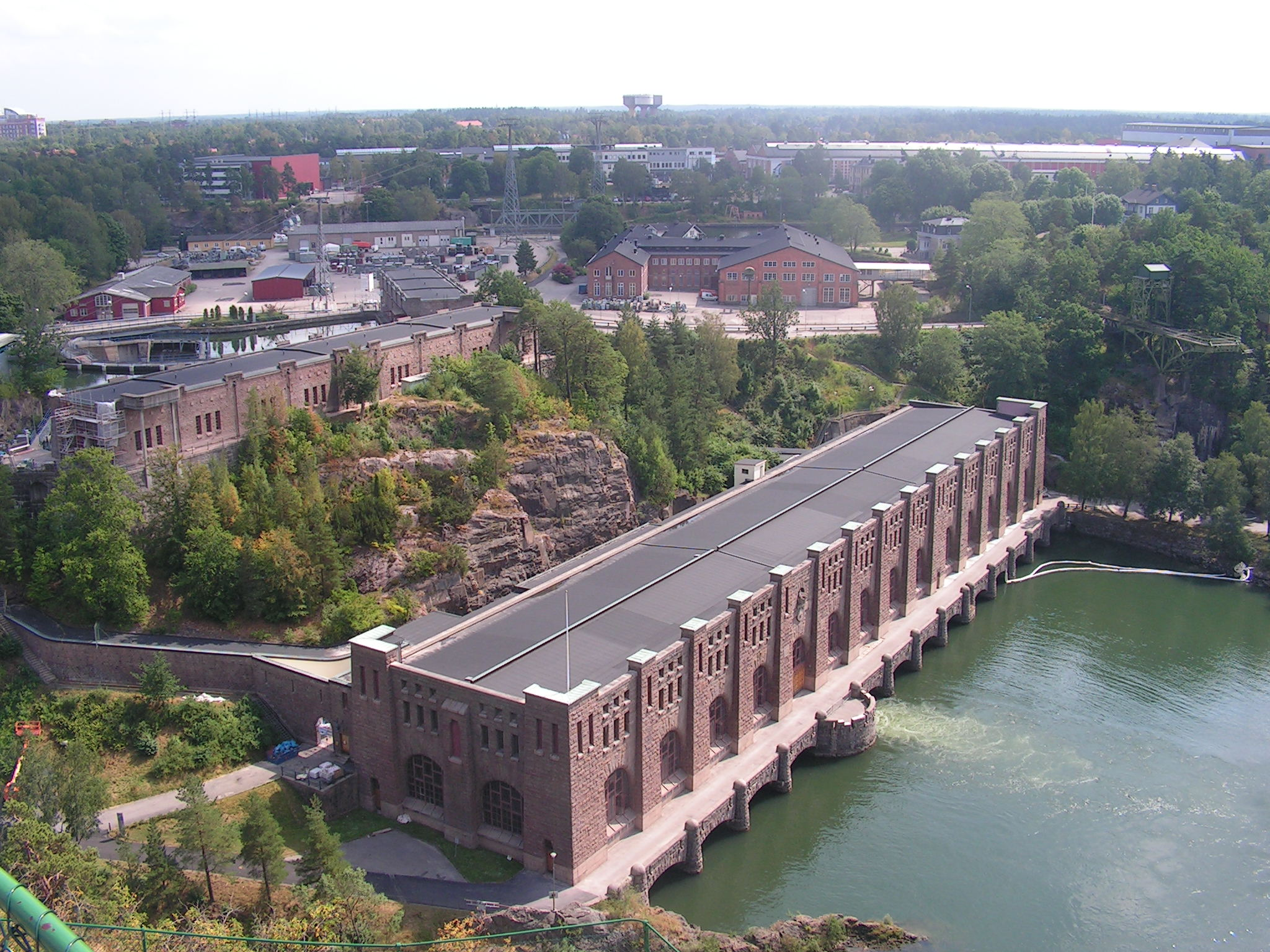
View from above

Olidan Power Station (Swedish: Olidans kraftverk) is a hydroelectric power station located in Trollhättan, Sweden. First opened in 1910, it was the first large scale attempt at generating electricity from water in Sweden. The construction of Olidan led to the founding of the Kungliga Vattenfallsstyrelsen (Royal Waterfall Board), which later became Vattenfall.

While the first four turbines were put into service in 1910, construction continued, and another four were put into operation by 1914. Due to increasing demand, as well as increasing capacity due to the regulation of Göta älv, another five were then built. By 1921, Olidan carried a total of 13 turbines. 10 of these are still functioning, while the other three were cannibalized for parts. However, it is currently rare for more than three to be generating at the one time. Each turbine has a capacity of 10 MW.

When Olidan were completed in 1924, planning began for Hojum Power Station, which came into service in 1938.

== Images ==
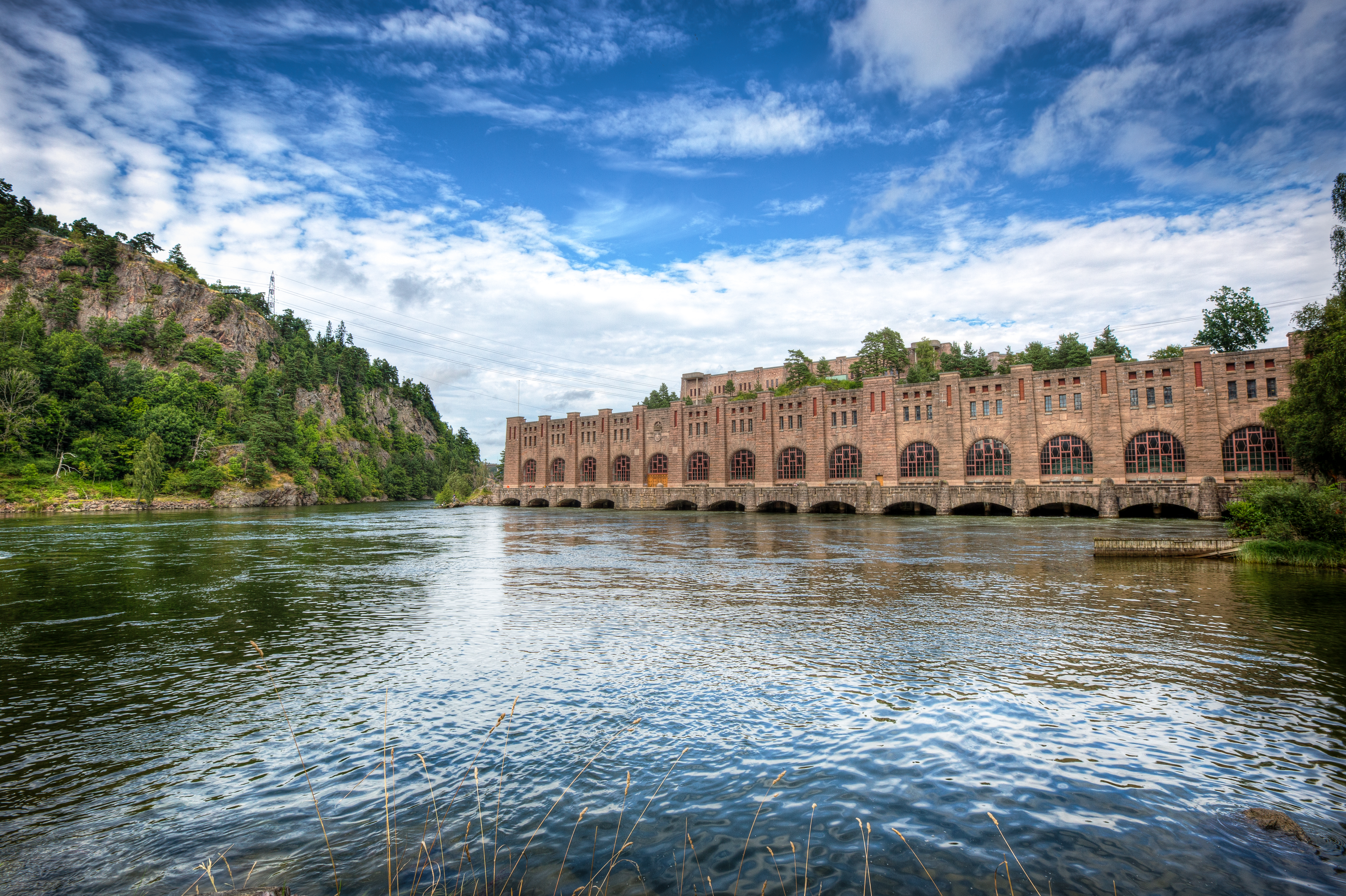
Olidan Power Station

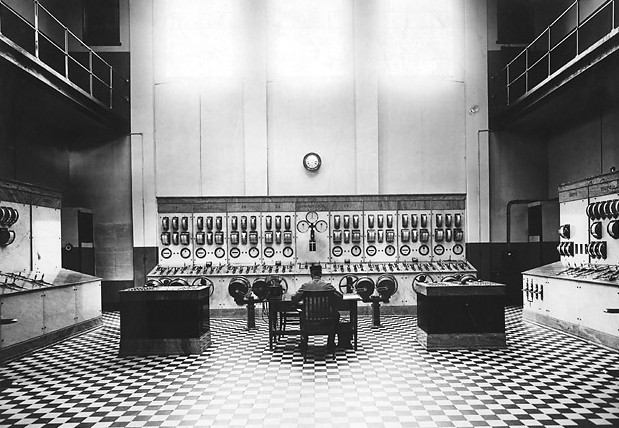
Control room in the 1940s

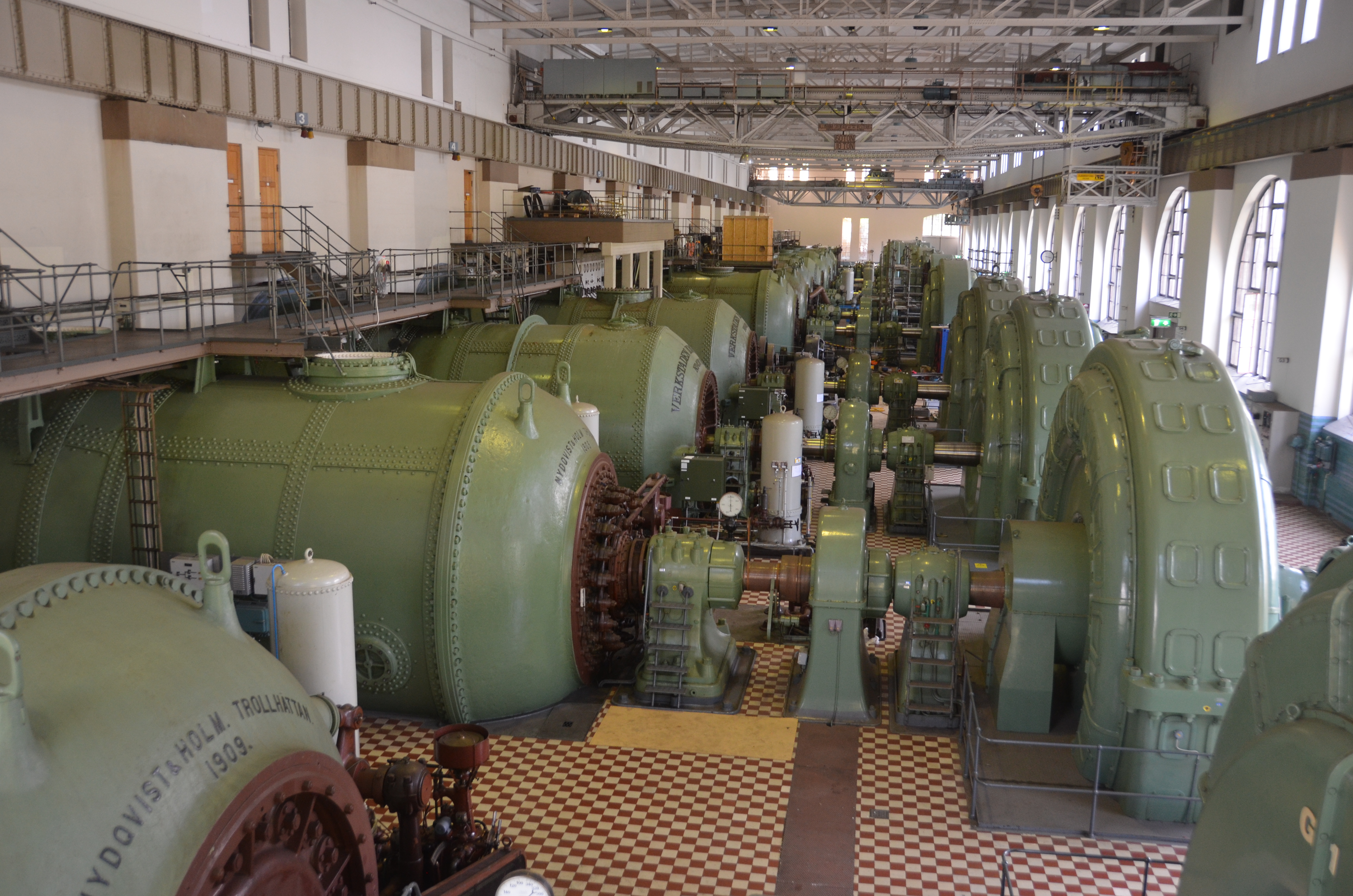
Engine Hall

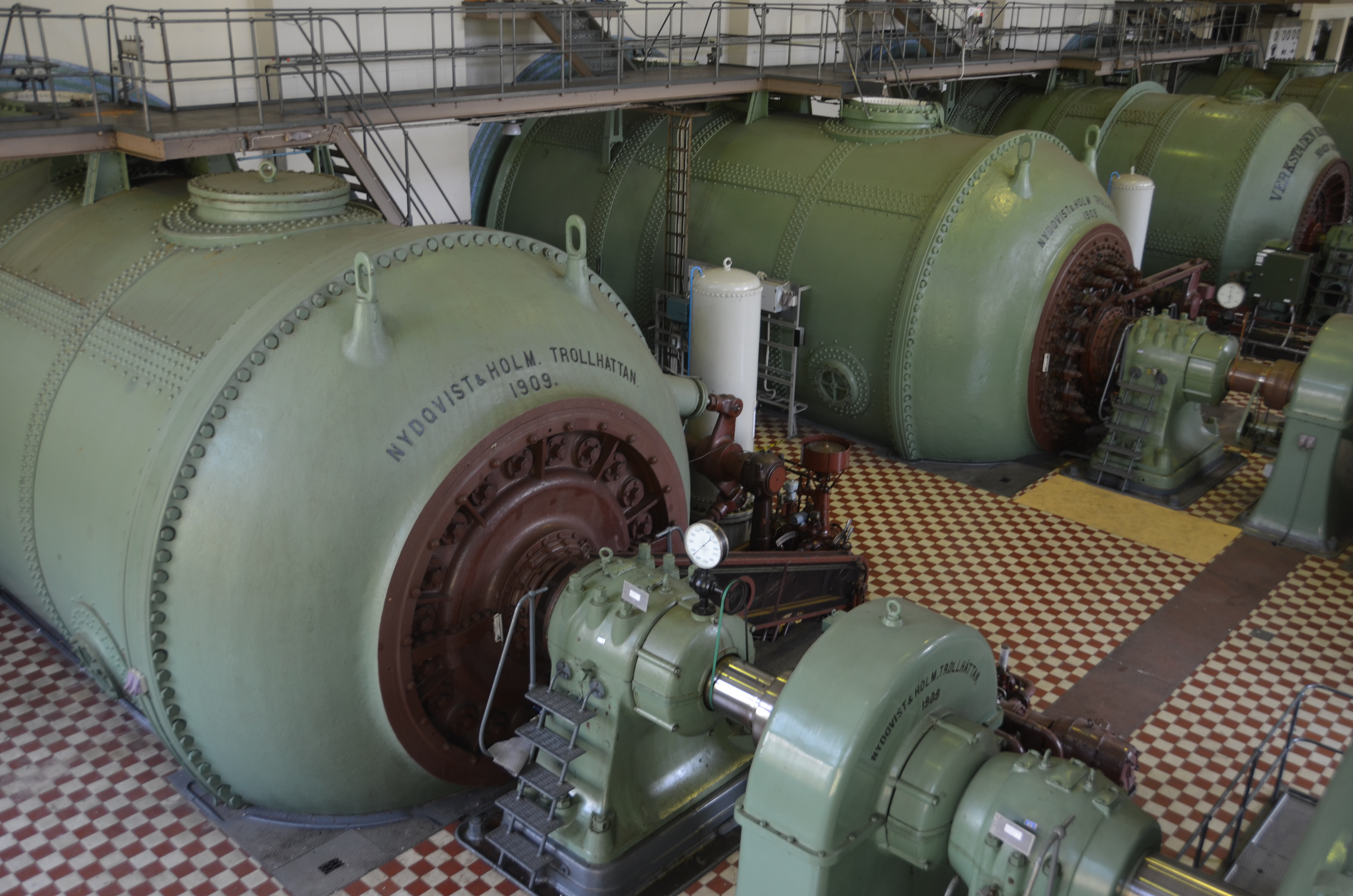
Turbines
