= Leif (album) =

Studio album by Galenskaparna och After Shave
- Released: 1987
- Recorded: Studio Bohus, Kungälv; Polar Studios, Stockholm
- Genre: Entertainment
- Length: 35 minutes
- Labels: Kulturtuben; Svensk Filmindustri
- Producers: Charles Falk; Claes Eriksson

Galenskaparna och After Shave chronology
Cyklar (1987)	Leif (1987)	Stinsen brinner (1988)

Leif is a studio album by Swedish comedy and revue group Galenskaparna och After Shave. It was released in 1987 on cassette, LP and CD, and contains the original music from the film with the same name.

== Track listing ==
All tracks are written by Claes Eriksson.

No.	Title	Artist(s)	Length
1.	"Leifs ouvertyr"	Charles Falk	1:20
2.	"Rotums paradmarsch"	After shave, Galenskaparna and Orphei Drängar	3:38
3.	"Kväll i en svensk idyll"	After Shave and opera singers	3:08
4.	"Dröm om kärlek"	Jan Gunér	4:17
5.	"Leif, vad har du gjort?"	Jan Rippe and opera singers	2:33
6.	"Leifs sång" (Instrumental)		3:05
7.	"Rotum rock" (Rotums Paradmarsch, rockversion)	Lars Berndtsson	3:30
8.	"Det blir ingen operation"	Anders Eriksson, After Shave and Kerstin Granlund	2:24
9.	"Kanondag i Rotum" (Rotumsången)	Jan Rippe and opera singers	2:28
10.	"Rotums paradmarsch" (Promenadversion)		3:07
11.	"Frid och fred och fröjd"		1:16
12.	"Leif, vad har du gjort?" (Jaktversion)		2:41
13.	"Leifs sång"	Knut Agnred, After Shave, Kerstin Granlund and Anders Eriksson	3:05
Total length:			35:12

- Arrangement: Charles Falk (1–13), Anders Widestrand (2, 9, 10), Den ofattbara orkestern (7)

== Personnel ==
=== Musicians ===
- Den ofattbara orkestern (3, 4, 5, 6, 8, 13):
  - Charles Falk – Keyboard, vocals
  - Jan Gunér – Bas, lead vocals (4), vocals
  - Lars Moberg – Guitar, vocals
  - Lars Berndtsson – Vocals
  - Måns Abrahamsson – Drums, vocals
  - Andreas Bergman – Bass
- Rotums musikkår (2, 9, 10):
  - Sven Fridolfsson – Saxophone (6, 13)
  - Magnus Johansson – Trumpet (8)
  - Gene De Vaughn – Trumpet (8)
  - Ralph Soovik – Trombone (8)
  - Imre Daun – Drums (8)
- Rotumkvartetten (3, 5, 9, 12):
  - Bertil Lindh – Violin
  - Thord Svedlund – Violin
  - Urban Ward – Cello
  - Bo Olsson – Viola
- Others:
  - Musicians from Göteborgs Symfoniorkester (1, 6, 12, 13)
  - Children's Choir from Brunnsboskolan, Gothenburg (conductor: Anne Johansson) (9)
  - Children's Choir from Lillegårdsskolan och Ugglumsskola, Partille (dir: Otto Gunér) (9)
  - Singers from Orphei Drängar (1, 9)

=== Production ===
- Charles Falk, Claes Eriksson – producers
- Rolf Allan Håkansson – cover designer
- Lars "Dille" Diedricson, Åke Linton, Bernard Löhr – technicians
- Jan Ugand, Rune Persson – technicians
- AB Svensk Filmindustri and AB Kulturtuben / Gala-vax – disc production
- Grammofon AB Electra – distribution

== See also ==
- Leif, film with the same name
