= Monopol (film) =

1996 film by Claes Eriksson

- Directed by: Claes Eriksson
- Written by: Claes Eriksson
- Produced by: Waldemar Bergendahl, Anne Otto
- Starring: Peter Rangmar; Knut Agnred; Per Fritzell; Kerstin Granlund; Anders Eriksson; Jan Rippe; Claes Eriksson
- Music by: Claes Eriksson
- Production company: Svensk Filmindustri
- Distributed by: Svensk Filmindustri
- Release date: 29 November 1996
- Running time: 106 minutes
- Country: Sweden
- Language: Swedish
- Budget: SEK 16,000,000 (US$1.3 million)

Monopol (Monopoly) is a 1996 Swedish comedy film directed by Claes Eriksson and the fifth to feature the members of Galenskaparna och After Shave.

== Plot ==
Egil (Knut Agnred), a middle-aged man living a simple life, is a regular painter. One day, when he is about to paint a fence, the film team of Långa näsan (Long Nose), one of Sweden's most popular television programs, including the host Hacke Häger (Per Fritzell), suddenly shows up. Egil becomes the victim of a candid-camera prank, which will be aired on television. To Häger's surprise, Egil does not want to sign the broadcast permit required to broadcast the footage, nor come to the studio. Häger, under pressure to make a good television episode, broadcasts the footage against Egil's wishes. Egil represents a small crowd of Swedish people who do not want to be on TV and become famous.

Sune Finåker (Peter Rangmar), Häger's employer, has a near-monopoly on Swedish TV and radio, owning 12 television channels, all commercially financed, but none of the state-owned channels. Hungry for more power and a full monopoly, he plans to buy them soon, so he forms his own political party. All of Sweden has been captivated in the hands of Finåker, with the slogan Förströelse och lätt underhållning (Amusement and Easy Entertainment), in front of their TV sets. Through a grand gala evening on his TV channels, he intends to win the elections via a majority vote and become Prime Minister, promising easy entertainment for everyone in the future.

In an attempt to prevent this total monopoly, Egil, along with Clary Blomstedt (Kerstin Granlund), an intellectual middle-aged teacher, and the incumbent government form a resistance group to end Finåker's plans to become Prime Minister by stopping him from gaining a majority in the elections.

== Cast ==
Galenskaparna och After Shave:

- Peter Rangmar - Sune Finåker
- Knut Agnred - Egil Rosén
- Per Fritzell - Häcke Häger
- Kerstin Granlund - Clary Blomstedt
- Anders Eriksson - Glenn Sivertsson
- Jan Rippe - Viggo Florin
- Claes Eriksson - Tobakshandlare Örn / Sångare i Arvstwistarna (Tobacco retailer Eagle / Singer in Arvstwistarna)

Other actors:

- Lisa Alvgrim - Kulturministern (Minister of Culture)
- Monica Dominique - Dagmar Fröberg
- Olof Thunberg - Ernst Fröberg
- Dan Ekborg - Parkbänksmannen (The park bench man)
- Mats Bergman - Personalchefen (Chief of Staff)
- Jörgen Mörnbäck - Professor Brio
- Jan Nygren - Viking Holm
- Olle Sarri - Chefsrekvisitören (Chief Requisitioner)
- Stefan Ljungqvist - Gud (God)
- Maria Lundqvist - Stjärnan (The star)
- Christina Stenius - Mamma Palle (Mommy Palle)
- Ulf Dohlsten - Pappa Palle (Daddy Palle)
- Charlott Strandberg - Programledare för Motsatserna (Program Manager for the Opposites)
- Mi Ridell - Bimbonyttuppläserskan (Bimbon surface reader)
- Håkan Johannesson - Gordon
- Lars Åby Hermansen - Turist (Tourist) (his voice is dubbed by Claes Eriksson)
