= Omi =

Omi or OMI may refer to:

== Organisations ==
- Optical Mechanics, Inc., a US telescope company
- Ottico Meccanica Italiana, an Italian company
- Original Musical Instrument Company, manufacturers of resonator guitars
- Open Music Initiative, a digital rights framework for the music industry
- OMI Rotterdam, a foundation from Rotterdam
- Missionary Oblates of Mary Immaculate, a Catholic missionary order

== Places ==
- Omi Shrine, in Ōtsu, Shiga Prefecture, Japan
- Ōmi Province, a former province of Japan
- Omi, Nagano, a village in Japan
- Omidiyeh Air Base (IATA code: OMI), Iran

== Science and technology ==
- HtrA serine peptidase 2 (symbol: OMI), an enzyme encoded by the HTRA2 gene
- Oocyte maturation inhibitor, created by follicular cells
- Ozone monitoring instrument, on the AURA satellite
- Outer, Middle and Inner, types of VHF marker beacon used in navigation

=== Computing ===
- OMI cryptograph, a cipher machine produced by Ottico Meccanica Italiana
- Open Management Infrastructure, an open-source CIM/WBEM management server
- Original Machine Interface, an instruction format used in the IBM i operating system
- Open Memory Interface, used for example in IBM Power10

== People ==
- Omi (singer) (born 1986), Jamaican reggae singer
- Omi (given name), including a list of name-holders
- Kōji Omi (尾身 幸次; born 1932), Japanese politician
- Takayuki Omi (近江 孝行; born 1982), Japanese footballer
- Yusuke Omi (近江 友介; born 1946), Japanese football player
- Toshinori Omi (尾美 としのり; born 1965), Japanese actor
- Toshiya Omi (尾身 俊哉; born 1995), Japanese footballer
- Shigeru Omi (尾身 茂; born 1949), President of the Japan Community Health Care Organization
- Tomoe Ohmi (近江 知永; born 1982), Japanese singer and voice actress
- Ōmi no Mifune (淡海三船; 722—785), Japanese scholar and writer
- Yukitaka Omi (小見 幸隆; born 1952), is a former Japanese football player
- Yurie Omi (born 1988), Japanese television announcer and news anchor

== Other uses ==
- Eight Views of Ōmi, traditional scenic views of Ōmi Province
- Omi (title), an ancient Japanese hereditary title
- Ōmi Code, a collection of laws compiled in 668AD in classical Japan
- Omi, protagonist of the animated TV series Xiaolin Showdown
- Omi language, spoken in the Democratic Republic of the Congo

== See also ==
- Horace Ridler (1882–1965), professional freak and sideshow performer known as "The Great Omi"
- Oumi
