= Peter Rangmar =

Swedish comedian and actor (1956–1997)

- Born: Johan Peter Mikael Rangmar; 10 November 1956; Annelund, Sweden
- Died: 24 May 1997 (aged 40); Gothenburg, Sweden
- Occupations: Comedian; actor; singer; director; screenwriter
- Years active: 1979–1997
- Known for: Galenskaparna och After Shave

Johan Peter Mikael Rangmar (10 November 1956 – 24 May 1997) was a Swedish comedian, actor, baritone, writer and television personality who was best known as a member of Galenskaparna och After Shave.

== Biography ==
Born in Annelund, Rangmar attended the Chalmers University of Technology where he majored in mechanical engineering. After completing his education, he became one of the primary founders of the barbershop quartet After Shave along with Jan Rippe, Knut Agnred and Per Fritzell. In 1982, the group merged with the comedy group Galenskaparna, becoming Galenskaparna och After Shave. They appeared in the television show Macken.

As an actor, Rangmar often portrayed temperamental or nervous characters. He has starred in several films alongside Galenskaparna och After Shave such as Leif and The Shark Who Knew Too Much. As a voice actor, Rangmar provided the voice of Timon in the Swedish-Language version of the animated film The Lion King. One of his last major film performances was in The Little Jönsson Gang and the Cornflakes Heist.

== Death ==
In 1994, Rangmar was diagnosed with melanoma, keeping the details about the illness fairly subtle while receiving treatment. He was set to be the host of Melodifestivalen 1997, but Janne Jingryd hosted instead. Eventually, on May 24 1997, Rangmar succumbed to the disease at the age of 40.

== Filmography ==
=== Cinema ===
Year	Title	Role(s)	Notes
1986	The Castle Tour	Guide	TV Film
1987	Leif	Inspector Mård / Taxi driver / Bishop	
1989	The Shark Who Knew Too Much	Lennart Cumberland-Brons	
1990	Macken – Roy’s & Roger’s Bilservice	Örjan	
1991	Stinsen brinner... filmen alltså	Harry Jernfeldt / Sven Sidney / Harry Jernfeldt’s father	
1994	The Lion King	Timon (voice)	Swedish dub
1995	En på miljonen	Employment Agency Psychologist	
1996	The Little Jönsson Gang and the Cornflakes Heist	Sigvard Jönsson	
1996	Monopol	Sune Finåker	

=== Television ===
Year	Title	Role(s)	Network	Notes
1983	Jonssons onsdag	Various	SVT1	
1986	Macken	Various	Sveriges Television	
1989–1990, 1996	En himla många program	Various	SVT1	
1993	Tornado	Various	Sveriges Television	
