= Hajen som visste för mycket =

- Directed by: Claes Eriksson
- Written by: Claes Eriksson
- Produced by: Waldemar Bergendahl
- Starring: Anders Eriksson; Kerstin Granlund; Claes Eriksson; Knut Agnred; Per Fritzell; Peter Rangmar; Jan Rippe; Laila Westersund
- Cinematography: Dan Myhrman
- Music by: Claes Eriksson
- Production companies: AB Kulturtuben; AB Svensk Filmindustri
- Distributed by: AB Svensk Filmindustri; Svenska Filminstitutet
- Release date: June 30, 1989
- Running time: 82 minutes
- Country: Sweden
- Language: Swedish
- Box office: 452,000 admissions (Sweden)

Hajen som visste för mycket (The Shark Who Knew Too Much) is a 1989 Swedish comedy film directed by Claes Eriksson and the second to star the members of Galenskaparna och After Shave.

== Plot ==
The rich builder Samuel Plottner (Claes Eriksson) catches on when his son Joakim (Anders Eriksson) write a newspaper article entitled "Eternit sheets makes you slimmer". The headline makes Eternit sheet manufacturer Davidsson & Locks shares skyrocket and everyone wants to know what Joakim knows.

Joakim claims that the whole thing was a printing error, the article was about cooking and that the title would be "Lasagna sheets makes you slimmer". But he also has a secret. He and his two brothers, Alexander and Lukas are really the same person, something that only he and their mother, Desiree knows.

The "shark" in the title is alluding to "finance sharks" (sly and dishonest business men).

== Cast ==
- Anders Eriksson as Joakim Plottner
- Claes Eriksson as Samuel Plottner
- Kerstin Granlund as Dixie Hopper
- Jan Rippe as Helge Lock
- Peter Rangmar as Lennart CumberlandasBrons
- Per Fritzell as Benny Hörnsteen
- Knut Agnred as Reverend Himmler
- Håkan Johannesson as Jorgen Lycke
- Charlotte Strandberg as Cilly CumberlandasBrons
- Rolf Allan Håkansson as The Architect
- Laila Westersund as The lady on the street
- Charles Falk as High Guard

== Reception ==
The film was the ninth most popular film of the year in Sweden with 452,472 admissions.

== Tenacious trial ==
In 2007, a lingering lawsuit was settled regarding the film Hajen som visste för mycket. Claes Eriksson reported TV4 when they found advertising in his film without his permission. Eriksson won over TV4, but the TV channel continued appeal until the matter was taken up by the Supreme Court. Eriksson won even there when the court said that TV4 violated Claes Eriksson through commercials.

== See also ==
- Galenskaparna och After Shave
- The movie soundtrack Hajen som visste för mycket
