= Fritzell =

Fritzell is a surname. Notable people with the surname include:

- Jim Fritzell, American screenwriter
- Per Fritzell, Swedish comedian and actor
