= Oumy =

Oumy is a female given name used by Senegalese people. Notable people with the name include:

- Oumy Bruni Garrel (born 2008), Senegalese-born French actress, the daughter of Louis Garrel and Valeria Bruni Tedeschi
- Oumy Diop (born 2003), French-Senegalese swimmer
- Oumy Ndour (born 1980), Senegalese filmmaker and journalist

== See also ==
- Oumi
