= Oumi =

Oumi may refer to:

- Oumi (TV series), 2003 Swedish TV series
- Akari Oumi (born 1989), Japanese volleyball player
- Oumi Janta (born 1991), Senegalese-born German jam skater and influencer
- Oumi Kapila (born 1995), British-born Australian musician

== See also ==
- Ōmi
- Omi (disambiguation)
- Oumy
