= Isabelle Boni-Claverie =

French-Ivorian writer and film and television director

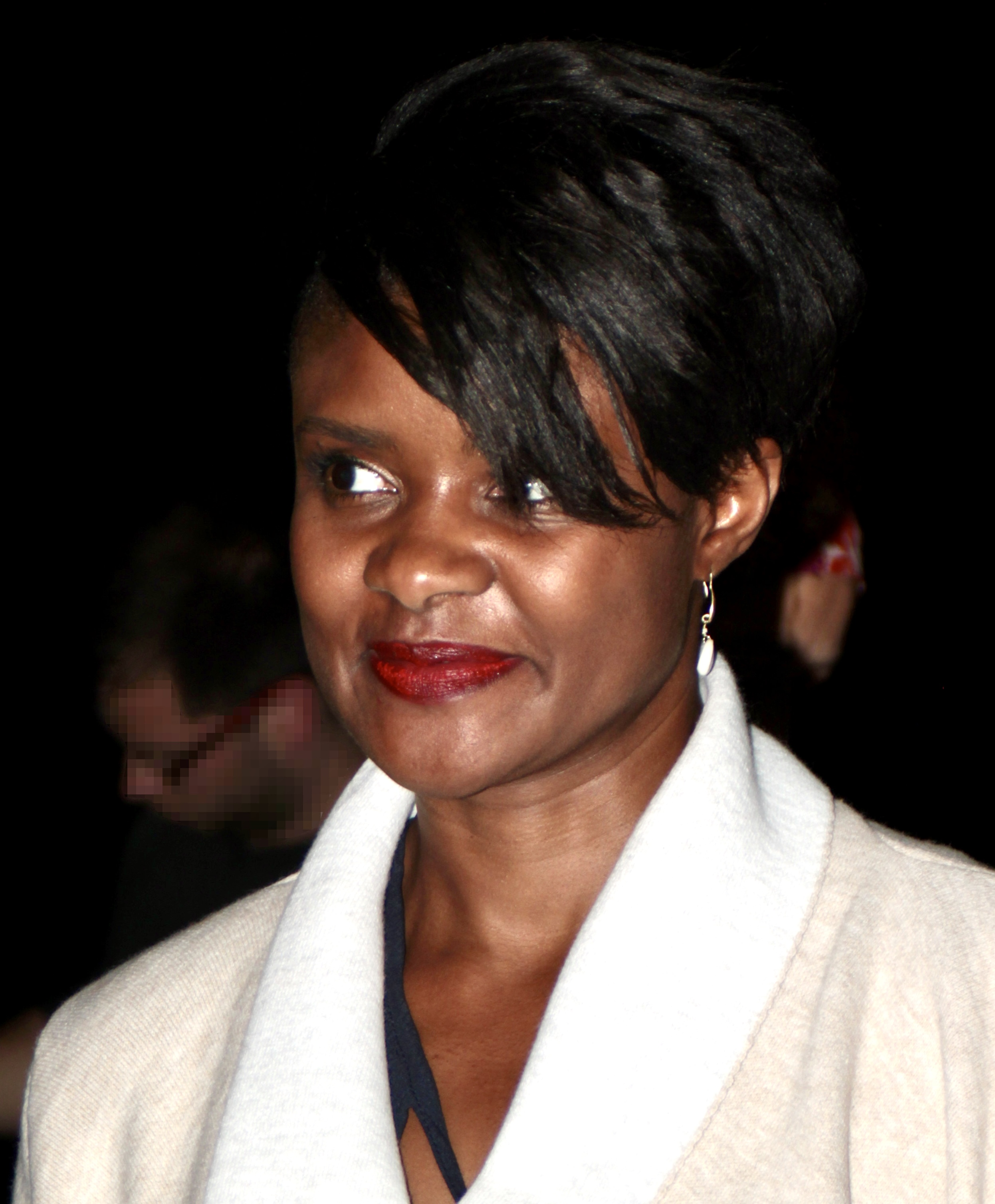
- Born: Ivory Coast
- Occupations: Author, screenwriter, film director
- Years active: 1990–present
- Notable work: Too Black to Be French? (documentary, 2015), Pour la Nuit (short film, 2004), La Grande Dévoreuse (novel, 2000)
- Website: boniclaverie.com

Isabelle Boni-Claverie (/ˈɪzəˌbɛl ˈboʊni-Claverie/) is an author, screenwriter, and film director born in the Ivory Coast. She moved to Switzerland when she was a few months old, then to France, but mostly grew up in Paris.

She is the granddaughter of Alphonse Boni, a French magistrate from 1939 to 1959 during the colonisation of Ivory Coast. After the independence of Ivory Coast, Alphonse Boni became Chief Justice of the country.

Isabelle Boni-Claverie studied French modern Literature and art history. After graduating from the Sorbonne, she entered the Parisian film school La Fémis where she graduated in 2000 with a specialization in screenwriting.

== Writing career ==
At the age of 17, Isabelle Boni-Claverie launched her writing career with the novel, La Grande Dévoreuse (The Great Devourer). Set in Abidjan, La Grande Dévoreuse tells the struggle of two teenagers to fulfill their dreams. It received an award at Le Prix du Jeune Ecrivain de Langue Française and was published in a collective book, Villes d’exil, by Le Monde Editions. Ten years later it was republished in the Ivory Coast by Nouvelles Editions Ivoiriennes (NEI).

She was later asked by the art curator, Simon Njami, to write for Planète Jeunes, a francophone monthly youth magazine. She collaborated with Planète Jeunes in 1993. She published a story about Abidjan's youth and many articles about culture.

In 1994, Simon Njami asked her to collaborate with Revue Noire, a magazine dedicated to contemporary African art. Isabelle Boni-Claverie was still a student when she started a six-year collaboration with Revue Noire. She was in charge of the cinema section.

From 1999 to 2005 she collaborated with Afrique Magazine where she created and ran the column Ma nuit avec (My night with), a series of reviews where she would spend the evening with a celebrity.

Boni-Claverie currently writes a column both in the French language Le Huffington Post and in the Nouvel Obs where she regularly publishes about what it means to be black in France, diversity, and inclusion.

== Short films ==
Due to her growing interest in cinema, she wrote the screenplay for her first short film, Le Génie d'Abou (Abu's Genie), which she directed in 1997. At that time she was a first year student at La Fémis and Le Génie d’Abou was supposed to be a mere training exercise. The school to showcase her short film at festivals. Screened in New York, Montreal, La Havane, Perugia and many other festivals around the world, it received a special mention at the International Short Film Festival of Abidjan. According to the African Film Festival in New York, Le Génie d’Abou is a film about Abou, a sculptor who is accompanied by a woman who may be an evil spirit or his muse. Another woman with an extraordinary figure arrives on the scene offering to be his model. Through this scenario, the film explores the issues between black and white bodies.

In 2004, she directed another short film, shot in black and white: Pour la Nuit (For the Night). Initially set to be filmed in Abidjan, because of the troubled politic situation at that time, the shooting was relocated to Marseille, France. A film about grief and identity, Pour la Nuit was distinguished by several awards: Jury Award of the Festival Provence, Terre de Cinéma, People's Award of Amiens’ House of Arrest, Feminine Interpretation Award at the International Short film Festival of Abidjan, Special mention at the Festival du Cinéma Africain, d’Asie et d’Amérique Latine, Special mention by Signis oecumenic award. It was in competition at Locarno, Amiens, FESPACO and Carthage.

== Screenplays ==
Because writing has always been her passion, alongside developing her film director career, Boni-Claverie has never stopped writing, notably for the small screen. She helped write screenplays for prime time and access TV series. She was one of the head writers of Seconde Chance (Second Chance) a TV series aired on TF1 in 2008, and nominated at the International Emmy Awards in 2009.

Her most significant collaborations with other filmmakers were with Haroun Mahamat Saleh for Sexe, Gombo et beurre salé (Sex, Okra and Salted Butter), a comedy aired on Arte in 2008, starring Aissa Maiga, Diouc Koma and Mata Gabin; Idrissou Mora-Kpai for two of his documentaries: Si-Gueriki (2002) and the award-winning feature documentary Arlit (2008); and well known documentary maker Jean-Marie Téno, with whom she developed several scripts.

== Documentary films ==
Her film directing career includes directing a few documentaries that tell real stories: -La Coiffeuse de la rue Pétion (The Hairdresser of Petion’s Street), shot in 1999 is about diversity. - L’Image, le vent et Gary Cooper (The Image, the Wind and Gary Cooper) was commissioned by the Center for Contemporary Culture in Barcelona, to accompany the exhibition Africas, the Artist and the City in 2001. -Documenta Opening Night, aired in 2002 on Arte, is a short documentary clip about Okwui Enwezor's Documenta in Kassel, Germany.

Her most recent documentary, Trop Noire pour être Française? (Too Black to Be French?) produced by Quark Productions was released on Arte on 3 July 2015. Combining an intimate approach with the testimony of black-skinned French citizens, and historians or sociologists like Pap Ndiaye, Achille Mbembe, Eric Fassin, Patrick Simon, she delivers a moving yet instructive documentary in which "she peels back the layers of race relations" according to Afro-Punk.

Too Black To Be French features an exploration of Boni-Claverie's own family history, especially distinct as she grew up in upper-class French society, and she uses this upbringing to examine how economic privilege did not prevent social discrimination on the basis of race. Her family exploration is accompanied by interviews of historians and academics including Pap Ndiaye, Achille Mbembe, Éric Fassin, discussing the legacy of colonialism, the history of French racism, and stereotypes that persist in French society today.

In addition to the scholarly analysis done through interviews with academics, "Too Black to Be French?" also features anecdotal testimonials of black French people, who describe their experiences of discrimination. Within the film, Boni-Claverie's tracing of her own family background (with demographer Patrick Simon as well as her relatives) firmly sets her as a multi-generation French person, and yet Boni-Claverie articulates that, on account of her blackness, she is not readily recognized as French in society. This sentiment is echoed by other testimonials and scholarly discussions in the film.

Within "Too Black To Be French?" Boni-Claverie also examines the essential distance between Black French citizenship and social recognition of such in the context of France's universalism. Through several interviews with sociologists, demographers, and historians, Boni-Claverie forms the argument that the colorblind legislation of universalism does not necessarily lead to greater equality, as it does not solve underlying problems of racial inequality.

In February 2015, Too Black to be French? was screened respectively at NYU and Columbia University, with Isabelle Boni-Claverie debating these issues for the first time in the United States.

Boni-Claverie was a juror in 2012 for the Mediterranean Short Film Festival of Tangier with Oumy Ndour and Safinez Bousbia.

== Bibliography ==
- 2000 : La Grande Dévoreuse

== Filmography ==
- 1998 Le Génie d'Abou] (short film)
- 1999 La Coiffeuse de la rue Pétion (documentary)
- 2001 L'Image, le vent et Gary Cooper (documentary)
- 2004 Pour la nuit (short film)
- 2015 Trop Noire Pour Etre Française ? (documentary)
