= Oumi (TV series) =

Swedish television series

Oumi is a Swedish television series in 24 episodes broadcast on Kanal 5 in 2003. It was directed by Hans Pihl and Pontus Ströbaek, and was hosted by Mi Ridell.

Ridell, using make-up and posing as the fictional Japanese journalist "Oumi", told Swedish celebrities that they were interviewed for a program called Good Morning Tokyo. Oumi conducted the interviews so that the interviewee usually was uncomfortable or embarrassed before finally unmasking.

The series was a comedy inspired in Wendy van Dijk's character Ushi Hirosaki.
