= OMI cryptograph =

The OMI cryptograph was a seven-rotor machine produced by Italian firm Ottico Meccanica Italiana.

The OMI cryptograph was a rotor cipher machine produced and sold by Italian firm Ottico Meccanica Italiana (OMI) in Rome.

The machine had seven rotors, including a reflecting rotor. The rotors stepped regularly. Each rotor could be assembled from two sections with different wiring: one section consisted of a "frame" containing ratchet notches, as well as some wiring, while the other section consisted of a "slug" with a separate wiring. The slug section fitted into the frame section, and different slugs and frames could be interchanged with each other. As a consequence, there were many permutations for the rotor selection.

The machine was offered for sale during the 1960s.
