= Ottico Meccanica Italiana =

Ottica Meccanica Italiana
- Industry: Photogrammetric instruments
- Founded: 1926; 99 years ago in Rome, Italy
- Founder: Umberto Nistri
- Successor: Aerofotogrammetrica Nistri; S.A.R.A. Nistri
- Headquarters: Italy
- Products: OMI cryptograph
- Parent: Agusta

Ottica Meccanica Italiana (OMI) was an Italian company producing photogrammetric instruments, founded in Rome in 1926 by Umberto Nistri. From 1962 on, Raffaello Nistri, son of Umberto, was president of the company. Since the 1980s the company has been part of Agusta. The air photography branch split into S.A.R.A. Nistri and Aerofotogrammetrica Nistri.

OMI produced the OMI cryptograph, a cipher machine similar to the more famous German Enigma.
