= OMI Rotterdam =

Public center for architecture

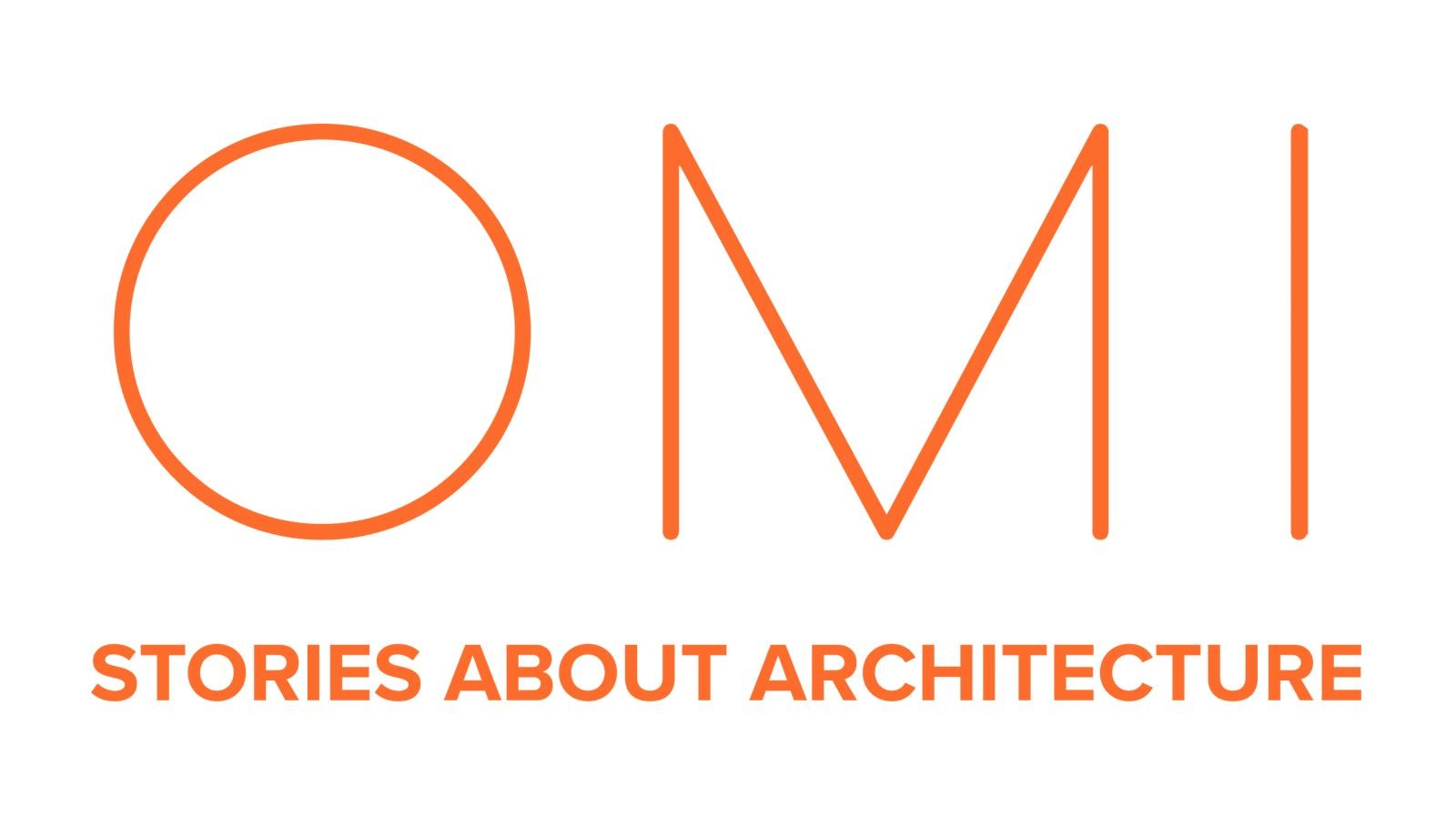
Logo OMI Rotterdam

OMI (Office for Metropolitan Information) is a foundation from Rotterdam, established in 2015 by Pieter Kuster, which aims to increase and broaden the public interest in architecture, urban culture and urban development.

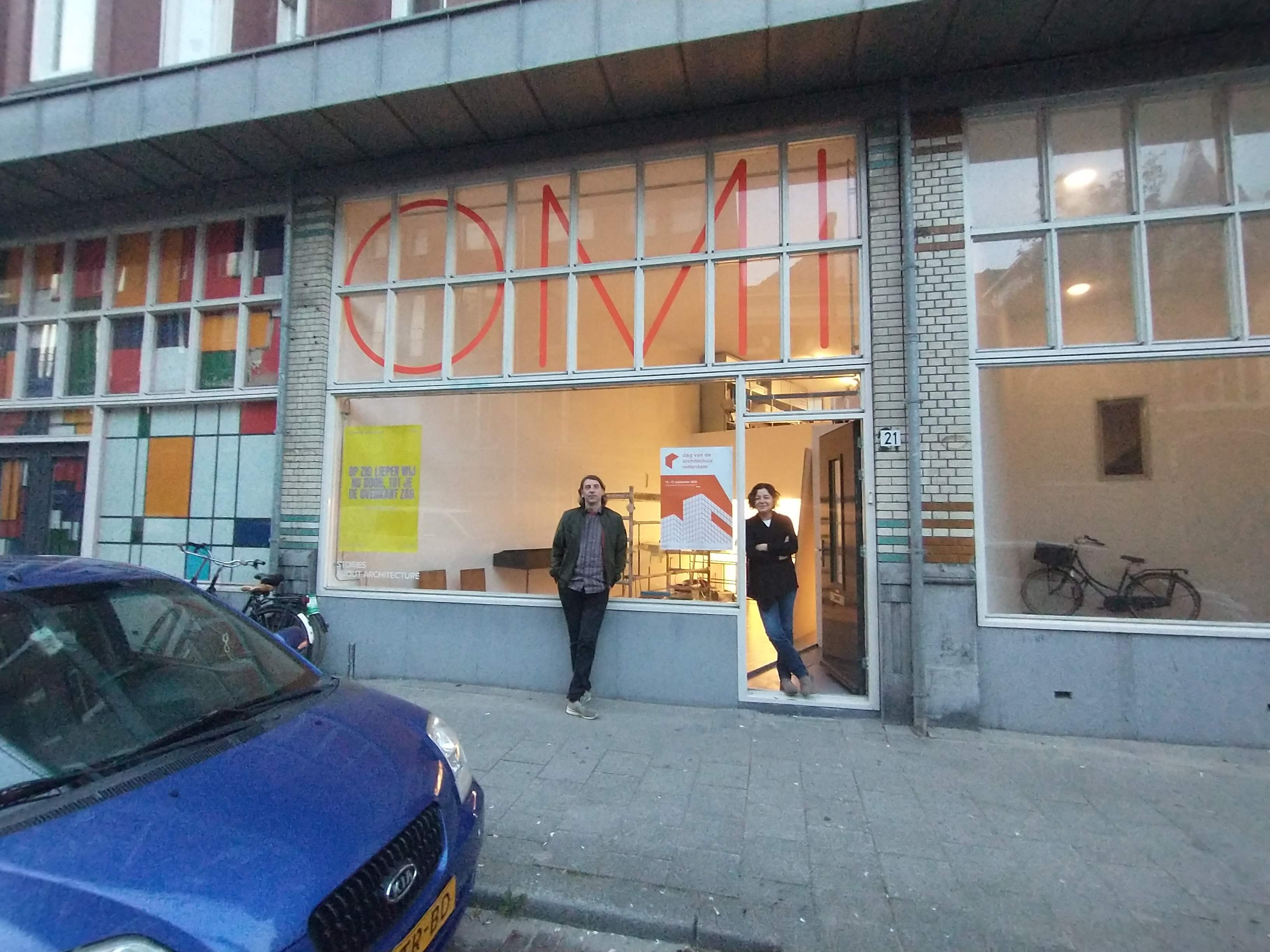
OMI Office for Metropolitan Information at the Schietbaanstraat 21, with founder Pieter Kuster (left)

== Start ==
OMI and an organization of Rotterdam architecture guides started in 2015 together in a part of the Schieblock, east of the Rotterdam Station. As of 2019, OMI has its own space at the Schietbaanstraat in the Oude Westen district. OMI annually programs and organizes a number of architectural activities and festivals, such as the ZigZagCity Architecture Festival. and the Rotterdam Day of Architecture Day. OMI also organizes exhibitions, walks, stories and conversations related to architecture

== Municipal subsidy ==
In 2021, with the advice of the Rotterdam Council for Art and Culture, OMI will be included in the Rotterdam Culture Plan, with an annual fixed contribution from the Municipality of Rotterdam. This subsidy is provided up to and including 2024 to support the activities of OMI. For the period 2025–2028, OMI is also included in the Rotterdam Culture Plan and is therefore financially supported.
