= Kerstin Granlund =

Swedish actress and comedian

- Born: Kerstin Marianne Granlund Wedin; 17 June 1951 (age 74); Essunga, Sweden
- Occupations: Revue artist, comedian, actor
- Known for: Galenskaparna och After Shave
- Spouse: Mats Wedin

Signature
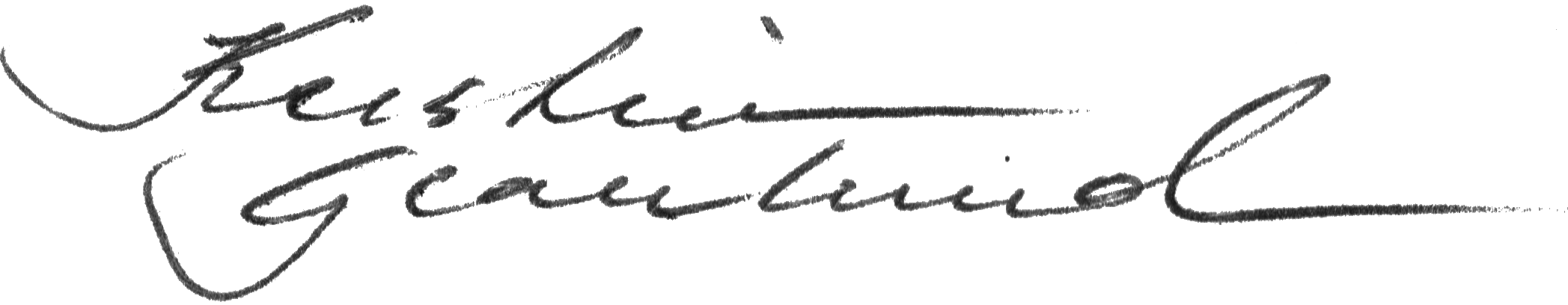

Kerstin Marianne Granlund Wedin (born 17 June 1951) is a Swedish revue artist, comedian and actress, who grew up in Trollhättan. She is primarily known as a member of the comedy group Galenskaparna och After Shave.

She is married to Liseberg's former CEO Mats Wedin.

== Biography ==
Kerstin Granlund had envisioned a career as a psychologist, before Claes Eriksson persuaded her to participate in the student spex Västgötaskoj in 1972. In 1974, she co-founded the spex group Utan lots. Since 1978, she has been part of the group Galenskaparna. She played revue with Hagge Geigert 1976 and 1983. In the summer of 1979 she participated in Sten-Åke Cederhök's Veckans Revy (Weekly Revue) at Liseberg.

As a single woman in Galenskaparna and After Shave Granlund has portrayed a wide range of women's roles. Among her many characters include feat mother in Stinsen brinner, the stripper Agda in Skruven är lös, the American Bonnie Armstrong in Grisen i säcken, the Countess in Alla ska bada, and the Angry lady in En himla många program.

== Filmography ==
- 2006 Den enskilde medborgaren ("The Individual Citizen")
- 2000 Gladpack
- 1998 Åke från Åstol
- 1996 Monopol ("Monopoly")
- 1993 Tornado
- 1991 Stinsen brinner... filmen alltså ("The Station Master is on Fire... The film, that is")
- 1990 Macken - Roy's & Roger's Bilservice ("The Petrol Station - Roy's and Roger's car service")
- 1989 En himla många program ("A Lot of Programs")
- 1989 Hajen som visste för mycket ("The Shark That Knew Too Much")
- 1987 Leif
- 1986 The Castle Tour
- 1986 Macken ("The Petrol Station")
