= Anders Eriksson (comedian) =

Swedish revue artist, comedian and actor

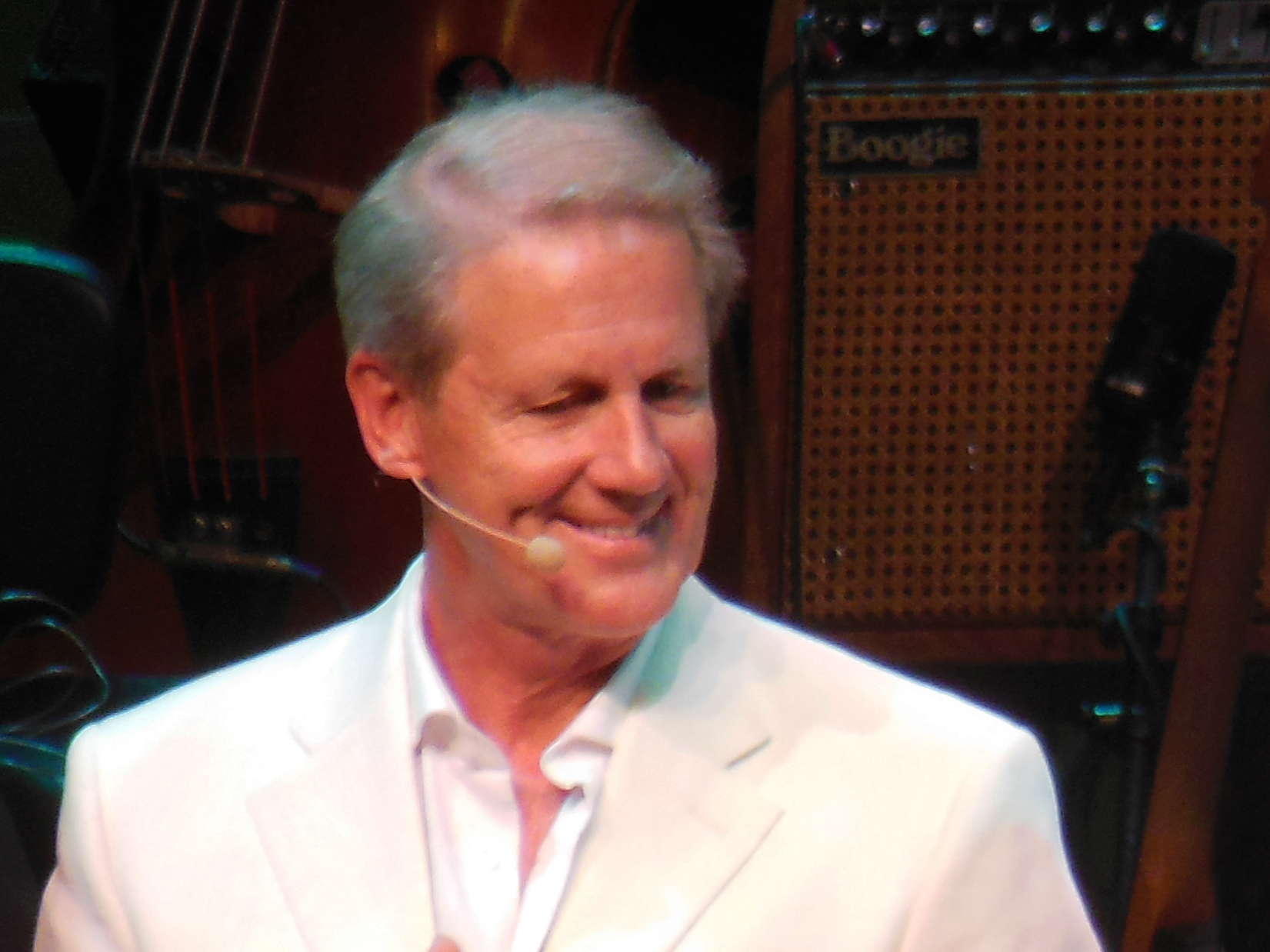
- Anders Eriksson in 2015
- Born: Anders Georg Eriksson; 3 August 1956 (age 69); Trollhättan, Sweden
- Occupations: Actor; comedian
- Years active: 1974–present
- Known for: Galenskaparna och After Shave

Signature
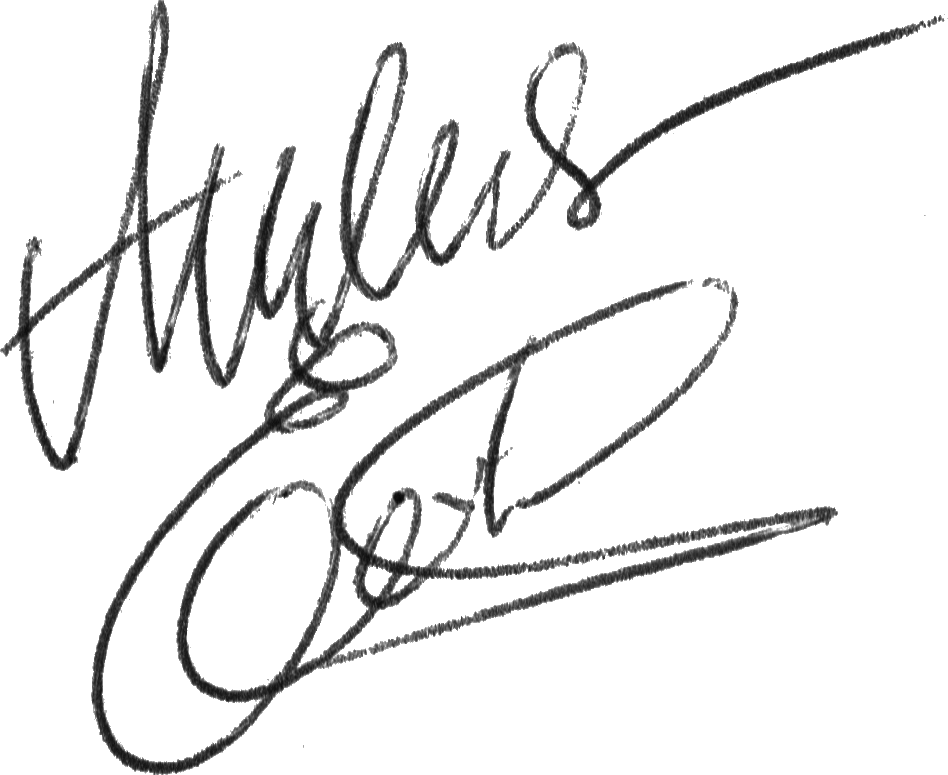

Anders Georg Eriksson (born 3 August 1956) is a Swedish revue artist, comedian and actor. He is best known as a member of the comedy group Galenskaparna och After Shave. Actor and comedian Claes Eriksson is Anders Eriksson's older brother.

== Biography ==
Anders Eriksson studied the teacher's program at Chalmers in Gothenburg. He never finished the program and became instead a member of the i revue group Galenskaparna which was founded in 1978. In 1982 the group started collaborating with the vocal group After Shave. Their collaboration has resulted in numerous revues, films and TV Series, often with Eriksson in the lead role.

The role as Roy in the TV series Macken from 1986 made him very popular. Another of his most famous characters are Farbror Frej ("Uncle Frej") which first appeared in the TV series En himla många program from 1989. Other characters are the social Spanar'n in revues and in En himla många program, and the passionate music teacher Morgan in Den enskilde medborgaren ("The Individual Citizen").

In addition to the work with Galenskaparna och After Shave, Eriksson has appeared solo with his banjolele. He has sung and played at festivals both in Sweden and abroad. His role model is George Formby.

== Stage performances ==
- 1982 Skruven är lös
- 1983 Träsmak
- 1985 Cyklar
- 1987 Stinsen brinner (lead role)
- 1991 Grisen i säcken
- 1992 Skruven är lös
- 1993 Nått nytt?
- 1994 Resan som blev av
- 1994 Lyckad nedfrysning av herr Moro
- 1997 Alla ska bada
- 2000 Allt Möjligt
- 2000 Jul Jul Jul
- 2002 Kasinofeber (lead role)
- 2010 Gubbröra och Pyttipanna
- 2010 Hagmans Konditori

== Filmography ==
- 2006 Den enskilde medborgaren
- 2000 Gladpack
- 1998 Åke från Åstol
- 1996 Monopol
- 1993 Tornado
- 1992 Nordexpressen
- 1991 Stinsen brinner... filmen alltså (lead role)
- 1990 Macken (one of the lead roles)
- 1989 En himla många program
- 1989 Hajen som visste för mycket (lead role)
- 1987 Leif (lead role)
- 1986 The Castle Tour
- 1986 Macken (one of the lead roles)
