= Guldmasken =

Swedish theatre award

Guldmasken (English: Golden Mask) was awarded annually for private theatre productions in Swedish theatres. The award was the Swedish equivalent of the Tony Awards. It was established in 1987 and was awarded until 2009. The prize was awarded at a ceremony in early March each year between 1988 and 2009.

== Categories ==
Guldmasken Award was awarded in the following categories:

- Best Production
- Best Director
- Best Actor in a Drama play
- Best Actress in a Drama play
- Best Actor in a Musical
- Best Actress in a Musical
- Best Performer/Entertainer (in a Show/Variety/Revue)
- Best Supporting Actor (in a Drama play, Musical or show/variety/revue)
- Best Supporting Actress (in a Drama play, Musical or Show/Variety/Revue)
- Best Costume
- Best Scenography/Set Decoration
- Best Choreography
- The Private Theatres Honorary Award
- The Jury's Special Prize
