= Oumy Ndour =

- Born: 1980 (age 45–46); Dakar
- Known for: film director journalist

Oumy Ndour (born 1980) is a filmmaker and journalist from Senegal. She is the co-founder of Ladies Club, an online community and networking platform for women.

== Early life and education ==
Ndour was born in Thiès. In 1998 she graduated from the l'Ecole de Bibliothécaires, Archivistes et Documentalistes (EBAD) at Cheikh Anta Diop University. In 2002 she continued her studies at the same university in the Centre d'études des sciences et techniques de l'information (CESTI), with a focus on television and graduating in 2002. Ndour then moved to Montreal and attended The Conservatoire Lassalle, earning a diploma in video in 2004.

== Career ==
=== Films ===
Upon Ndour's move to Montreal, she worked at the non-profit, Vues d'Afrique, on their film festival while studying. Then, after earning her degree, she directed her first documentary in 2007, "Njakhass (Patchwork)," a documentary about the Baye Fall, a Senegalese Muslim sect, which was featured in several festivals.

In 2008 she joined Senegal's public television news station, Radio Television Senegal (RTS). As a news anchor for RTS she reported breaking news and Senegalese culture for their Culture and Society department. In 2010 she began leading the cinema segment on RTS's morning show, Kenkelibaa. She has been a juror for film festivals such as the International Women's Film Festival of Salé in 2011 and the Mediterranean Short Film Festival of Tangier in 2012 with fellow jurors, Isabelle Boni-Claverie and Safinez Bousbia.

=== Ladies Club ===
After leaving RTS she co-founded Ladies Club in April 2016 with Mame Codou Dieng Cissé. Ladies Club network is a platform for women only to discuss and network, to enable women to talk about issues affecting them, to find solidarity amongst other women, and to provide community and help for women in need. The network offers monthly meetings, entrepreneurial training workshops, and help finding work, housing and healthcare.

== Activism ==
Oumy Ndour chose to wear a hijab on television and was a member of Collective Muslima, an activist group against stigmatization of veiled women, making them more visible citizens of society.
