= Mi Ridell =

Swedish actress and singer (born 1968)

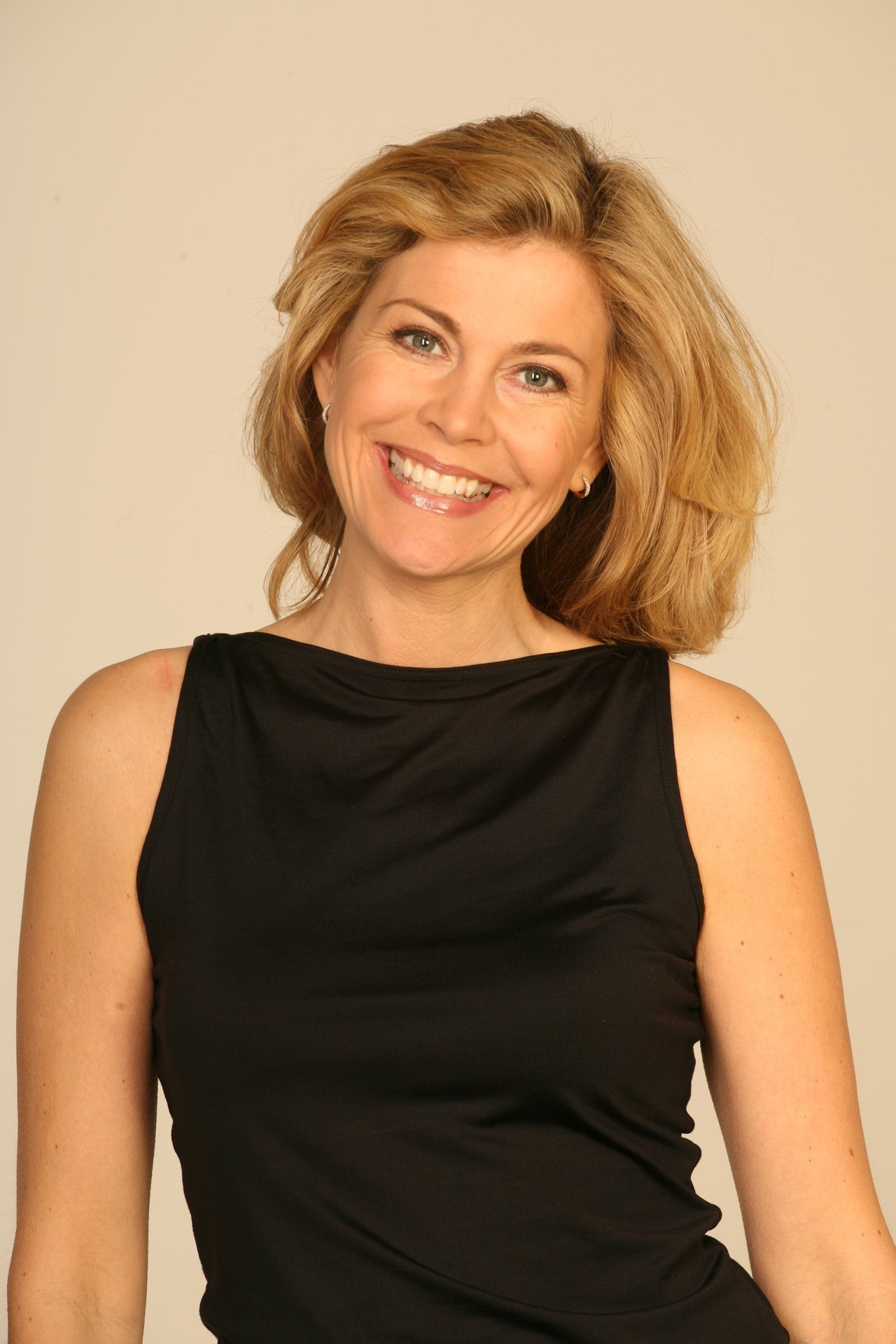
Mi Ridell in 2009

Mi Ridell (born 3 June 1968 in Karlskrona) is a Swedish actress and singer.

Ridell was a celebrity dancer on Let's Dance in 2008, broadcast on TV4.

== Selected filmography ==
- Oumi (2004) (TV)
