= Claes Eriksson =

Swedish actor, comedian and composer

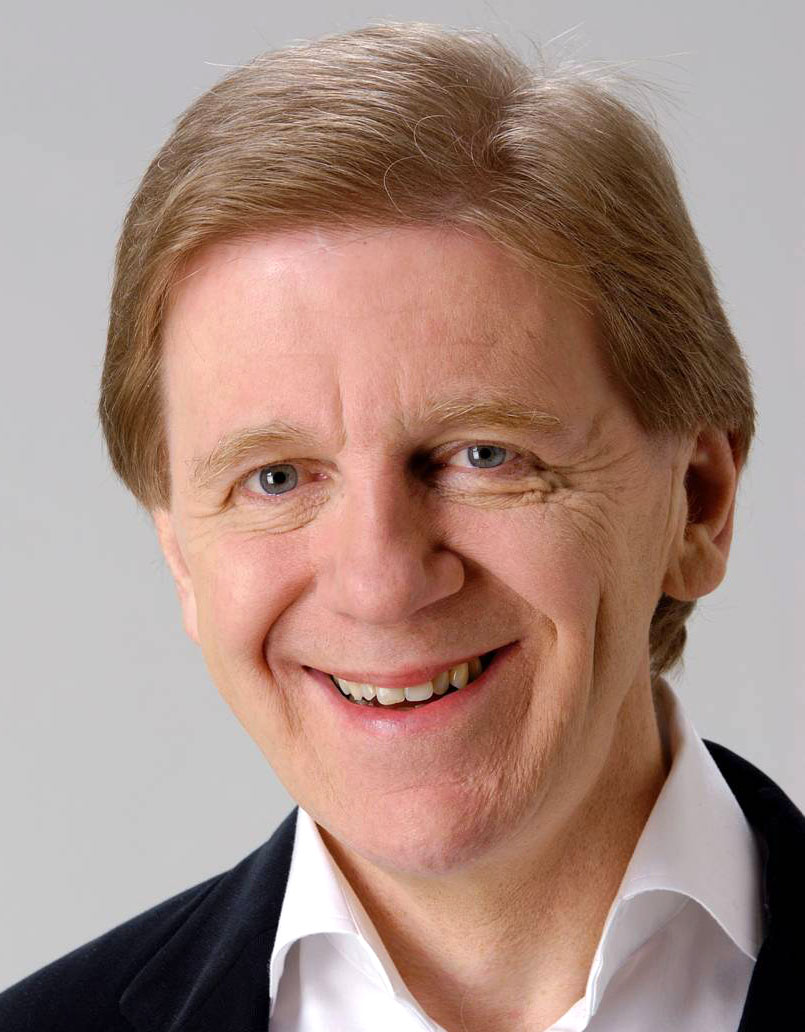
- Eriksson in 2014
- Born: Claes Ingvar Eriksson; 27 July 1950 (age 75); Trollhättan, Sweden
- Occupations: Director; revue artist; comedian; screenwriter; actor; composer
- Years active: 1974–present
- Known for: Galenskaparna och After Shave
- Partner: Anne Otto

Signature
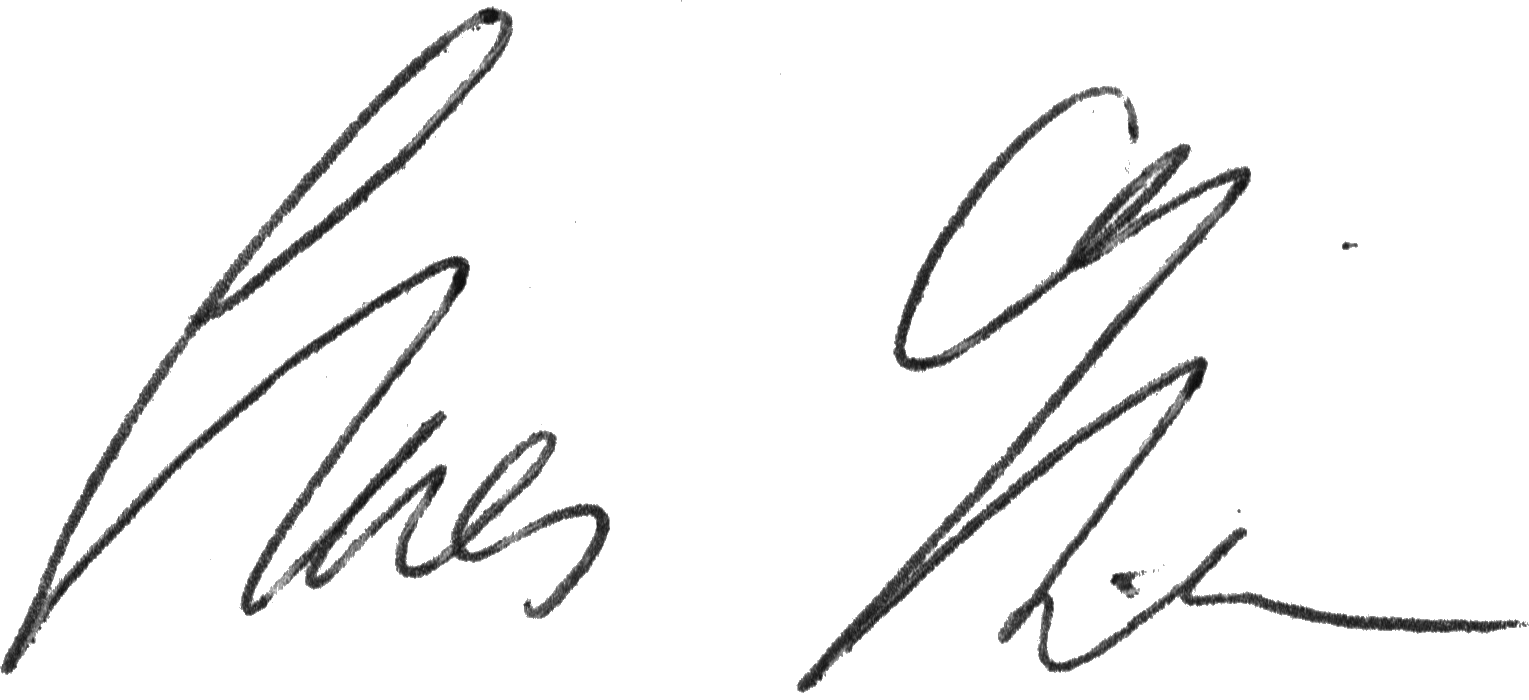

Claes Ingvar Eriksson (born 27 July 1950) is a Swedish director, screenwriter, revue artist, comedian, actor and composer. He is best known as a member of the comedy group Galenskaparna och After Shave, where he also is the group's main director, screenwriter and composer for their productions. Anders Eriksson, who is also a member of the group, is Claes Eriksson's younger brother.

== Biography ==
Claes Eriksson's interest in the revue and entertainment began early in life. He started writing lyrics and music. In 1974 he founded the group Utan lots ("Without pilot"), where future revue colleague Kerstin Granlund was a member. In 1975, the group got attention at an artist forum and started to tour in public parks. Eventually they make their own floor show at Restaurang Trädgårn in Gothenburg. The group disbanded in 1976 and the same year, Eriksson and Granlund got involved in Hagges revy at Lisebergsteatern.

In 1978 he formed the comedy trio Galenskaparna with his younger brother Anders Eriksson and Kerstin Granlund. In 1981 they released their first LP Utanför slottet ("Outside the castle"). In September 1982 they merged with the singing group After Shave and have since then made several revues, TV series and movies together, which Claes Eriksson has participated in and with few exceptions, written and directed.

Two of his most famous roles are "den beige kunden" ("the beige customer") in Macken and the program presenter Allan Preussen in En himla många program ("A Lot of Programs"). He has also written and composed much music, where several of his songs have become hits for example Macken ("The gas station"), Pappa jag vill ha en italienare ("Daddy I want an Italian") and Man ska ha husvagn ("You should have caravan").

Claes Eriksson often depict everyday events as he manages to screw in a comical way. He has a fondness for the "little" man who fights against authority and power users and has described himself as "an old-school social democrat, a reformist socialist". His work has often been in the style of Povel Ramel and Tage Danielsson playing with the Swedish language in a clever and humorous way. Over the years, his writing pen has become increasingly sharper and the satire all the more hard hitting. In 2003 he collected his best lyrics in the book Alster - en stunds texter that were issued by the publisher Ordfront.

In 1987 he received the Karamelodiktstipendiet from Povel Ramel's hand and in 2004 he was awarded the Fridolf Rhudin Scholarship.

== Filmography ==
- 2006 Den enskilde medborgaren ("The Individual Citizen")
- 2000 Gladpack
- 1998 Åke från Åstol
- 1996 Monopol ("Monopoly")
- 1993 Tornado
- 1991 Stinsen brinner... filmen alltså ("The Station Master is on Fire... The film, that is")
- 1990 Macken - Roy's & Roger's Bilservice ("The Petrol Station - Roy's and Roger's car service")
- 1989 En himla många program ("A Lot of Programs")
- 1989 Hajen som visste för mycket ("The Shark That Knew Too Much")
- 1987 Leif
- 1986 The Castle Tour
- 1986 Macken ("The Petrol Station")

== Works ==
=== Director ===
==== Films ====
- 2006 Den enskilde medborgaren
- 1998 Åke från Åstol
- 1996 Monopol
- 1991 Stinsen brinner... filmen alltså
- 1990 Macken - Roy's & Roger's Bilservice
- 1989 Hajen som visste för mycket
- 1987 Leif
- 1986 The Castle Tour

==== TV series ====
- 2000 Gladpack
- 1993 Tornado
- 1989 En himla många program
- 1986 Macken

==== Revues and tours ====
- 2010 C Eriksson MAX
- 2007 C Eriksson Solo
- 2004 Det ska va gôtt å leva
- 2002 Kasinofeber ("Casino Fever")
- 2000 Jul Jul Jul ("Christmas Christmas Christmas")
- 2000 Allt Möjligt ("Everything Possible")
- 1997 Alla ska bada ("Everyone Will Bathe")
- 1994 Lyckad nedfrysning av herr Moro ("Successful Freezing of Mr. Moro")
- 1994 Resan som blev av ("The Journey that Happened")
- 1993 Nått nytt? ("Something new?")
- 1992 Skruven är lös - 10-årsjubileum ("The Screw is Loose - 10th anniversary")
- 1991 Grisen i säcken ("The Pig in the Bag")
- 1987 Stinsen brinner ("The Station Master is on Fire")
- 1987 Slottsturné - a tour in different château ruins in Sweden.
- 1985 Cyklar ("Bikes")
- 1983 Träsmak ("Taste of Wood")
- 1982 Skruven är lös ("The Screw is Loose")

=== Screenwriter ===
==== Films ====
- 2006 Den enskilde medborgaren
- 1998 Åke från Åstol
- 1996 Monopol
- 1991 Stinsen brinner... filmen alltså
- 1990 Macken - Roy's & Roger's Bilservice
- 1989 Hajen som visste för mycket
- 1987 Leif
- 1986 The Castle Tour

==== TV series ====
- 2000 Gladpack
- 1993 Tornado
- 1989 En himla många program
- 1986 Macken
- 1983 Jonssons onsdag

==== Revues and tours ====
- 2007 C Eriksson Solo
- 2004 Det ska va gôtt å leva
- 2002 Kasinofeber
- 2000 Jul Jul Jul
- 2000 Allt Möjligt
- 1997 Alla ska bada
- 1994 Lyckad nedfrysning av herr Moro
- 1994 Resan som blev av
- 1993 Nått nytt?
- 1991 Grisen i säcken
- 1987 Slottsturné
- 1987 Stinsen brinner
- 1986 The Castle Tour
- 1985 Cyklar
- 1983 Träsmak
- 1982 Skruven är lös

=== Composer ===
==== Films ====
- 2006 Den enskilde medborgaren
- 1996 Monopol
- 1991 Stinsen brinner... filmen alltså
- 1990 Macken - Roy's & Roger's Bilservice
- 1989 Hajen som visste för mycket
- 1987 Leif

==== TV series ====
- 2000 Gladpack
- 1993 Tornado
- 1989 En himla många program
- 1986 Macken
- 1983 Jonssons onsdag

==== Revues and tours ====
- 2007 C Eriksson Solo
- 2004 Det ska va gôtt å leva
- 2002 Kasinofeber
- 2000 Jul Jul Jul
- 2000 Allt Möjligt
- 1997 Alla ska bada
- 1994 Lyckad nedfrysning av herr Moro
- 1994 Resan som blev av
- 1993 Nått nytt?
- 1991 Grisen i säcken
- 1987 Slottsturné
- 1987 Stinsen brinner
- 1986 The Castle Tour
- 1985 Cyklar
- 1983 Träsmak
- 1982 Skruven är lös

=== Literature ===
- 2003 Alster - en stunds texter by Claes Eriksson
- 2007 Alster - en stunds texter was released in paperback version
- 2007 Alster - an audiobook for the book Alster - en stunds texter

== Awards ==
- 1987 Karamelodiktstipendiet
- 1993 Guldmasken för bästa skådespelare (shared it with Anders Eriksson)
- 1995 Guldmasken, juryns specialpris
- 2000 Guldmasken, revymasken
- 2004 Revyräven
- 2004 Kommunals kulturstipendie
- 2004 Fridolf Rhudin-priset
- 2008 Guldpäran
