= Omi (given name) =

Omi is a given name.

People with the name include:

== Given name ==
- Omi Minami (南 央美, born 1968), Japanese voice actress
- Omi Sato (佐藤 大実, born 1975), former Japanese football player
- Ōmi Komaki (小牧 近江, 1894 – 1978), the pen-name of Komaki Ōmiya
- Omi Vaidya (born 1982), American actor

== Fictional characters ==
- Ōmi Takahata (高畠 青海), a character from Saya no Uta
- Omi, a character from Xiaolin Showdown
- Omi Fushimi (伏見 臣), a character from A3!

== See also ==
- Omi (singer), mononymous Jamaican singer
