= Macken (TV series) =

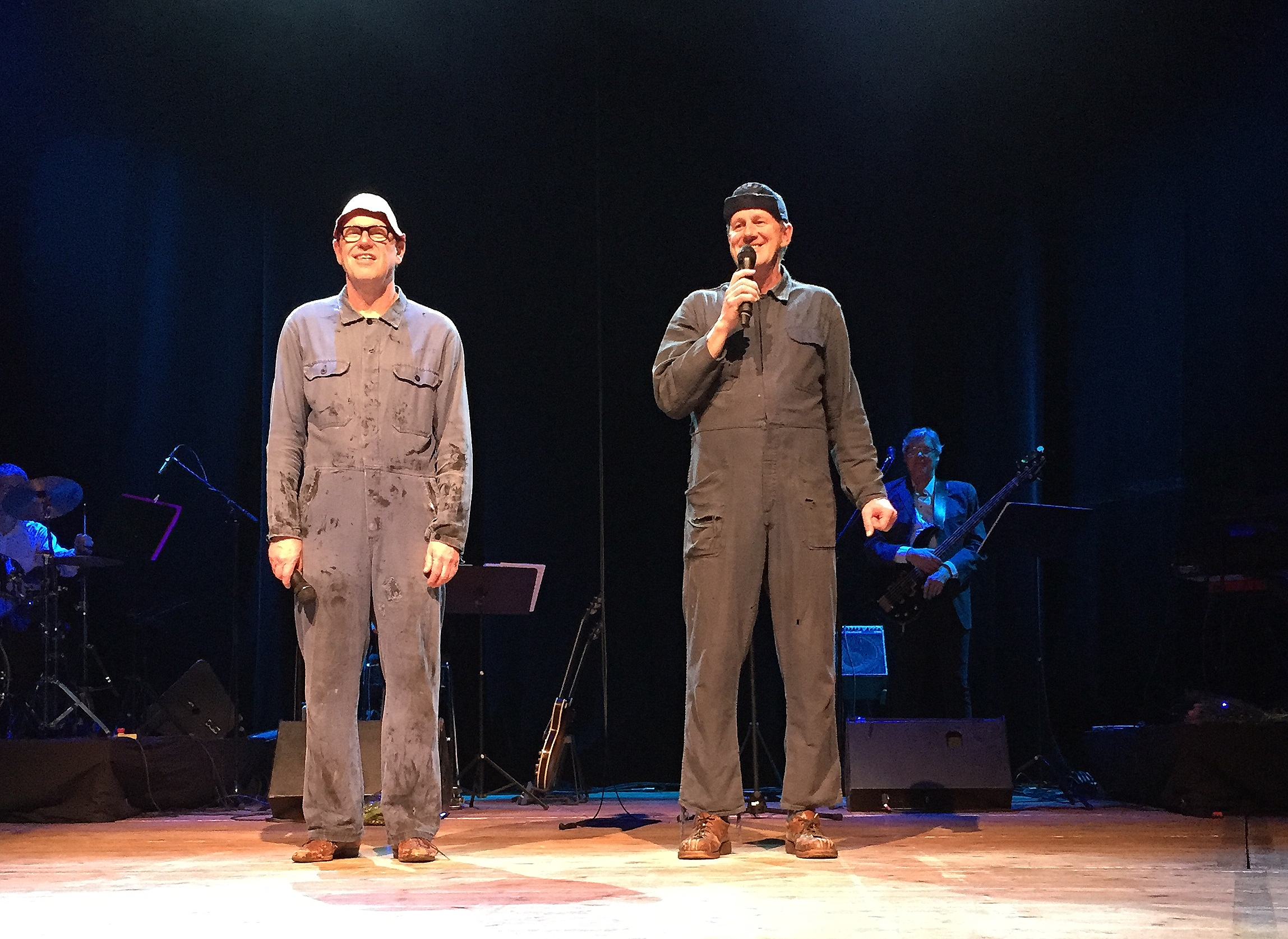
- From the left Jan Rippe as Roger, and Anders Eriksson as Roy, at Louis De Geer, in Norrköping, 13 March 2015
- Genre: Comedy
- Written by: Claes Eriksson
- Directed by: Claes Eriksson; PA Norell
- Composers: Claes Eriksson; Knut Agnred
- Country of origin: Sweden
- Original language: Swedish

Production
- Producer: PA Norell
- Production company: Kulturtuben

Original release
- Network: SVT
- Release: 23 August – 27 September 1986

Related
- Macken – Roy's & Roger's Bilservice; Macken – TV-serien på scen

Macken (Swedish slang for The Filling Station) was a Swedish six-part musical sitcom that ran on SVT in 1986. It was produced by Galenskaparna och After Shave and was a major breakthrough for the group. The programmes were built up from a series of sketches, sometimes with comedy or satirical elements.

Some of the songs from the show became hits on Svensktoppen, and the series was adapted into a 1990 film, Macken – Roy's & Roger's Bilservice. The series was also adapted to a play, Macken – TV-serien på scen, in 2016.

== Story ==
The story centres around the two brothers Roy and Roger who own a small car garage and adjoining self-service petrol station, with associated shop, in Västergötland (an old garage in Vara was used as the outside location in the 1990 movie).

The bulk of the show involves the eccentric customers that the pair have to deal with. There are also three subplots, where the local authority wants to demolish the garage to build a new motorway; where an annoyed customer keeps returning to collect his white Opel, after a service, but Roy and Roger are unable to find the car; and where a very timid, beige-clothed man keeps parking his blue Volvo 240 outside the garage, much to Roy's annoyance, but is too nervous to ever actually approach Roy or Roger.

== Production ==
The show was shot completely in the studio with no exterior shots. The setting never moves from the interior of the station and aside from a small glimpse when Roy opens the backdoor you never see how the outside looks.

== In other media ==
The television series was adapted into a film, Macken – Roy's & Roger's Bilservice, in 1990.

In 2016, the television series was adapted into a stage play, Macken – TV-serien på scen. As of 2018, the play is still touring the country, largely with the original cast. The script is almost identical to the original television screenplay.
