= Galenskaparna och After Shave =

Swedish comedy group

Galenskaparna & After Shave
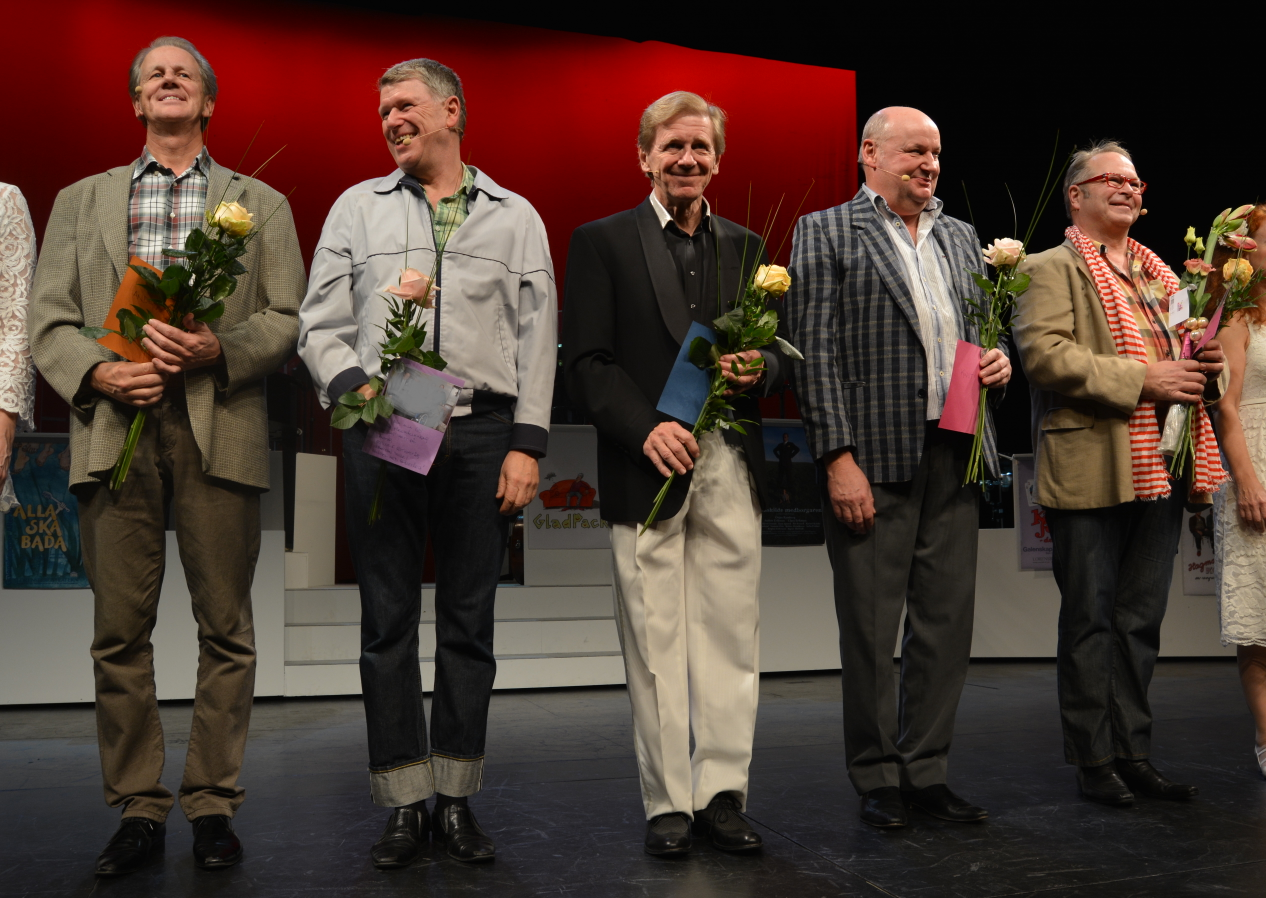

Comedy career
- Years active: 1982–present
- Medium: Television, film, theatre, audio recordings
- Genres: Sketch comedy, satire, barbershop
- Members: Anders Eriksson; Claes Eriksson; Jan Rippe; Kerstin Granlund; Knut Agnred; Per Fritzell
- Former members: Peter Rangmar (deceased)
- Website: Kulturtuben

Galenskaparna och After Shave is the collaborative name of two Swedish comedy groups, Galenskaparna and After Shave, from Gothenburg. In 1982 the two groups joined in order to collaborate on the revue show Skruven är lös, and the collaboration has continued. Since the early 1980s, Galenskaparna och After Shave have produced nearly 28 revues, restaurant shows, and tours, as well as 8 movies, 5 television series and 30 studio albums.

Galenskaparna och After Shave has made some of the biggest movie, TV, song and revue successes in Swedish history, including TV series Macken (The Petrol Station), the movie Hajen som visste för mycket (The Shark that Knew Too Much) and the revue Stinsen brinner (The Station Master is on Fire).

== Members ==
Galenskaparna is a comedy troupe which was formed in 1978. Members of the group are Anders Eriksson, his older brother Claes Eriksson and Kerstin Granlund. Granlund and Claes Eriksson had previously appeared together in a popular student comedy group called Utan Lots, 1972–77, at university.

After Shave formed in 1979 as a barbershop quartet at Chalmers University of Technology in Gothenburg. Its members are Jan Rippe (bass), Knut Agnred (solo/tenor) and Per Fritzell (tenor). Peter Rangmar (baritone) was the fourth member, but died in 1997 at 41 years old.

Most of the original members of the two groups are still members of Galenskaparna & After Shave; the exceptions are Rangmar, who was a member until his death, and Granlund, who left the group in the early 2000s. The motor and key person of the group is often said to be Claes Eriksson, as he generally is the writer and director of the group's various productions, and also the person writing the songs for the productions.

The group is influenced a lot by the humour of both Monty Python and Hasseåtage, as well as Povel Ramel (in terms of his musical humour and playfulness with texts and lyrics), and also the physical comedy of Charlie Chaplin and Buster Keaton. Claes Eriksson is also a sharp political critic, and uses humour to comment on Swedish society and politics.

== Productions ==
=== Revues, musical theatre ===
- 1982 Skruven är lös ("The Screw is Loose")
- 1983 Träsmak ("Taste of Wood")
- 1985 Cyklar ("Bikes")
- 1987 Stinsen brinner ("The Station Master is on Fire")
- 1991 Grisen i säcken ("The Pig in the Bag")
- 1992 Skruven är lös
- 1994 Lyckad nedfrysning av herr Moro ("Successful Freezing of Mr. Moro")
- 1996 Kanske Rödluvan ("Maybe Little Red Riding Hood")
- 1997 Alla ska bada ("Everyone Will Bathe")
- 2000 Allt Möjligt ("Everything Possible")
- 2000 Jul Jul Jul ("Christmas Christmas Christmas")
- 2002 Kasinofeber ("Casino Fever")

=== Innshows and shows ===
- 1987 Kabaré Kumlin
- 1996 Kajskjul 8
- 1996 Åke från Åstol
- 1999 En himla helkul kväll
- 2004 Falkes Fondue
- 2007 Familjen Falke
- 2007 Cabaret Cartwright

=== Tours ===
- 1987 Norrlandsturné - a tour in Norrland.
- 1987 Slottsturné - a tour in different château ruins in Sweden.
- 1993 Nå't nytt? ("Something new?")
- 1994 Resan som blev av ("The Journey that Happened")
- 2000 Gladpack (Glad wrap)
- 2001 Den gode, den onde, den fule och Rippe - a parody/satire on The Good, the Bad and the Ugly.
- 2004 Det ska va gôtt å leva ("It Should Be Good to Live")

=== Television program ===
- 1983 Jonssons onsdag ("Jonssons Wednesday") - the group's first television program.
- 1986 Macken ("The Petrol Station") - one of the most popular television comedies in Swedish history.
- 1989 En himla många program ("A Whole Lot of Programs")
- 1993 Tornado - the group's second most popular television series.
- 2000 Gladpack

=== Movies ===
- 1986 The Castle Tour - a shortmovie recording in Tjolöholms slott outside of Gothenburg.
- 1987 Leif
- 1989 Hajen som visste för mycket ("The Shark That Knew too Much")
- 1990 Macken - Roy & Rogers Bilservice ("The Petrol Station - Roy's and Roger's car service")
- 1991 Stinsen brinner... filmen alltså ("The Station Master is on Fire... The film, that is")
- 1996 Monopol ("Monopoly")
- 1998 Åke från Åstol - the second shortmovie recording on the island Åstol in Bohuslän.
- 2006 Den enskilde medborgaren ("The Individual Citizen")
