= Jan Rippe =

Swedish actor, singer, and comedian

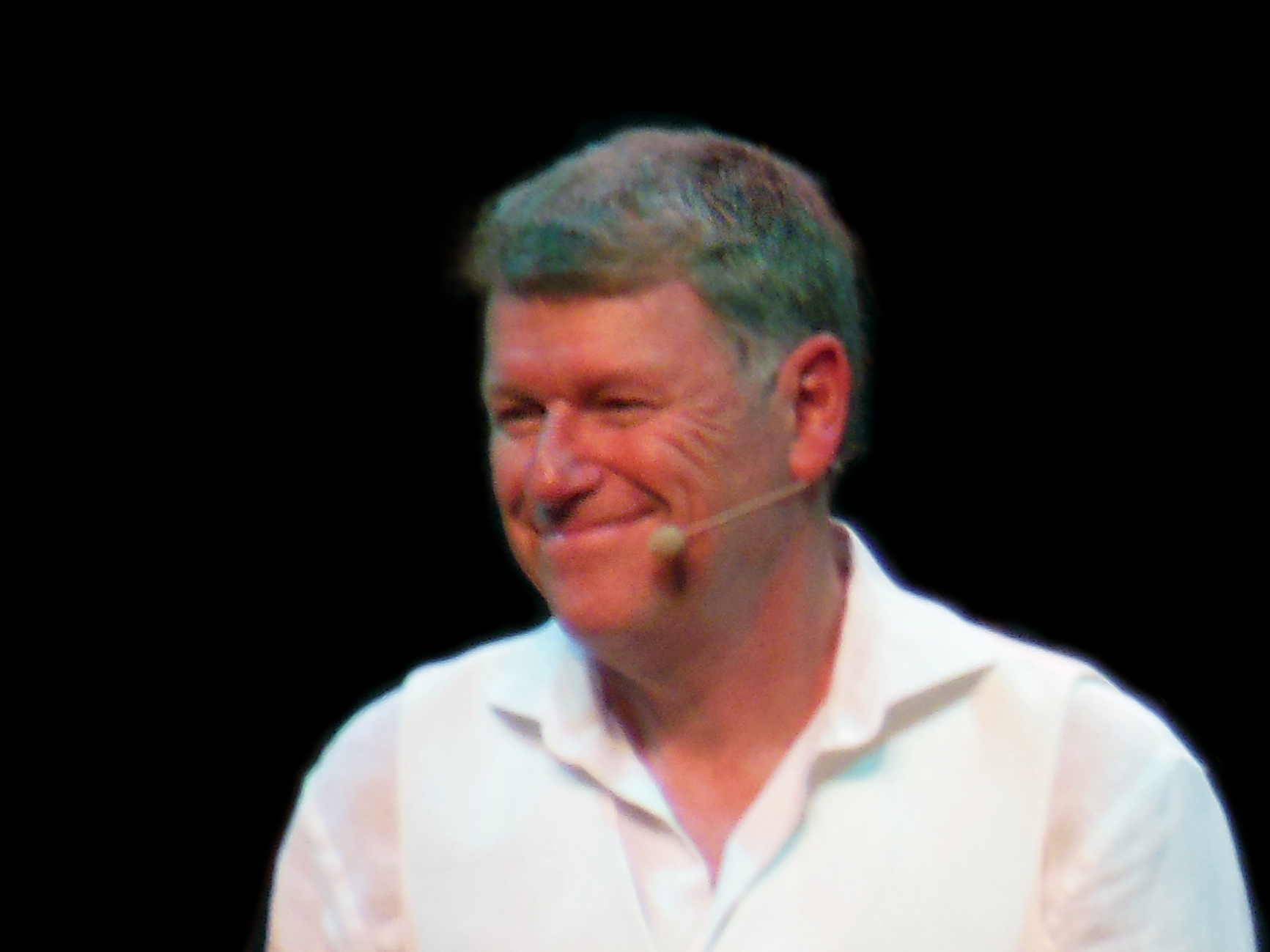
- Rippe in September 2015
- Born: 26 April 1955 (age 70); Lyrestad, Sweden
- Occupations: Actor; singer; comedian
- Known for: Galenskaparna och After Shave

Signature
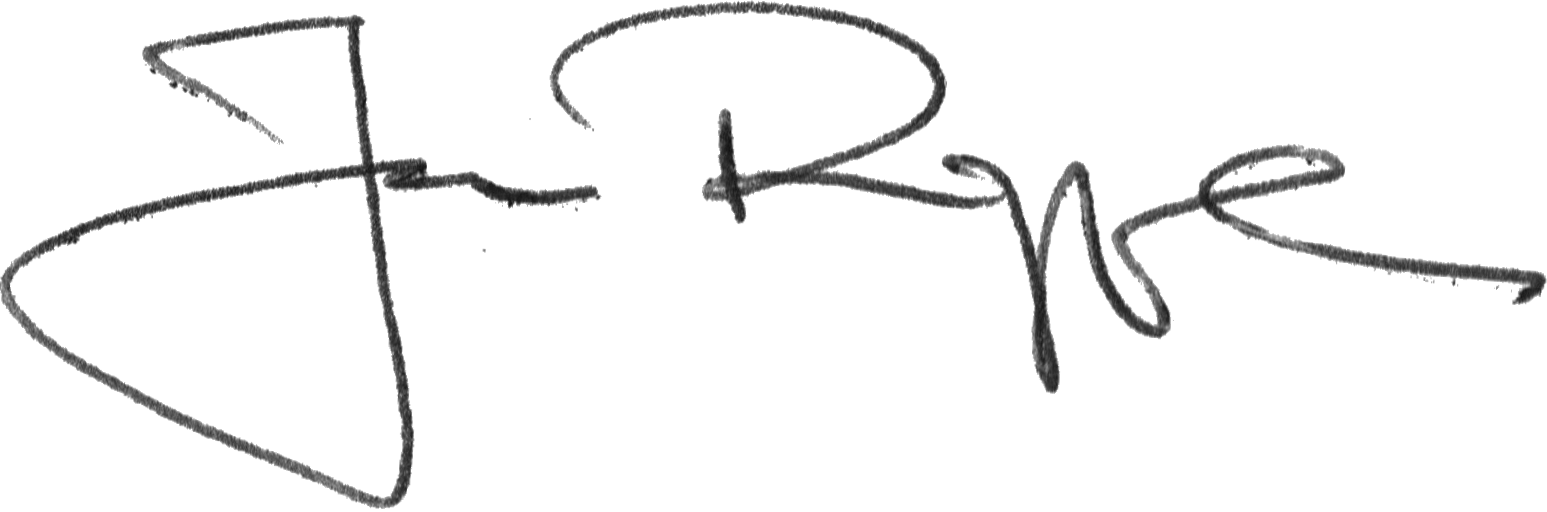

Jan Torbjörn Rippe (born 26 April 1955) is a Swedish actor, singer, and comedian. He is known as a member of the comedic groups Galenskaparna and After Shave. He also had a role in the comedy series Macken.

== Early life ==
Rippe was born in Lyrestad. During his youth, he was an active competitive swimmer and participated in several district and Swedish national championships. He studied at Chalmers and was a member of the Elektroteknologsektionens tidningsförening.

== Career ==
In Gothenburg he met and befriended the other members of the group After Shave and participated in Galenskaparna och After Shave's revue Skruven är lös. He became widely known to Swedish audiences from his role as Roger in the 1986 television comedy series Macken which was broadcast on SVT. He also voiced the part of Pumbaa in the Swedish language version of the Disney film The Lion King. He did not reprise his role in the sequels and spin-offs in the 90's, due to Peter Rangmar's death of melanoma in May 1997. Rangmar was Timon's Swedish voice and he and Rippe had a close friendship. Rippe reprised the role in The Lion King 1½. Timon were now voiced by Per Fritzell.

Rippe often plays characters that are confused, slow people that make everything the wrong way and have low self-confidence as a result of this. Amongst Rippe's roles are Kennet Aalborg in the TV-series En himla många program, the producer Viggo Florin in the film Monopol, and Ernst Ivarsson in Stinsen Brinner. One of the characters that he often plays is that of Goja, an individual that tells rambling stories without an ending or point. Jan Rippe participated in SVTs television broadcasts of the 2006 Winter Olympics in Turin as a tittarombudsman.

In October 2016, a theater version of Macken was made at the Lorensbergsteatern, with Rippe playing his original role.

== Personal life ==
In 2009, Rippe suffered a heart attack.

== Filmography ==
- 1986 – Macken (TV-series)
- 1986 – The Castle Tour
- 1987 – Leif
- 1989 – En himla många program
- 1989 – Hajen som visste för mycket
- 1990 – Macken – Roy's & Roger's Bilservice
- 1991 – Stinsen brinner... filmen alltså
- 1991 – Luigis Paradis
- 1993 – Tornado
- 1994 – The Lion King (Voice of Pumbaa)
- 1996 – Monopol
- 1998 – Åke från Åstol
- 2000 – Gladpack
- 2004 – The Lion King 3 – Hakuna Matata (Voice of Pumbaa)
- 2005 – En decemberdröm
- 2006 – Den enskilde medborgaren
