= Knut Agnred =

Swedish singer and comedian

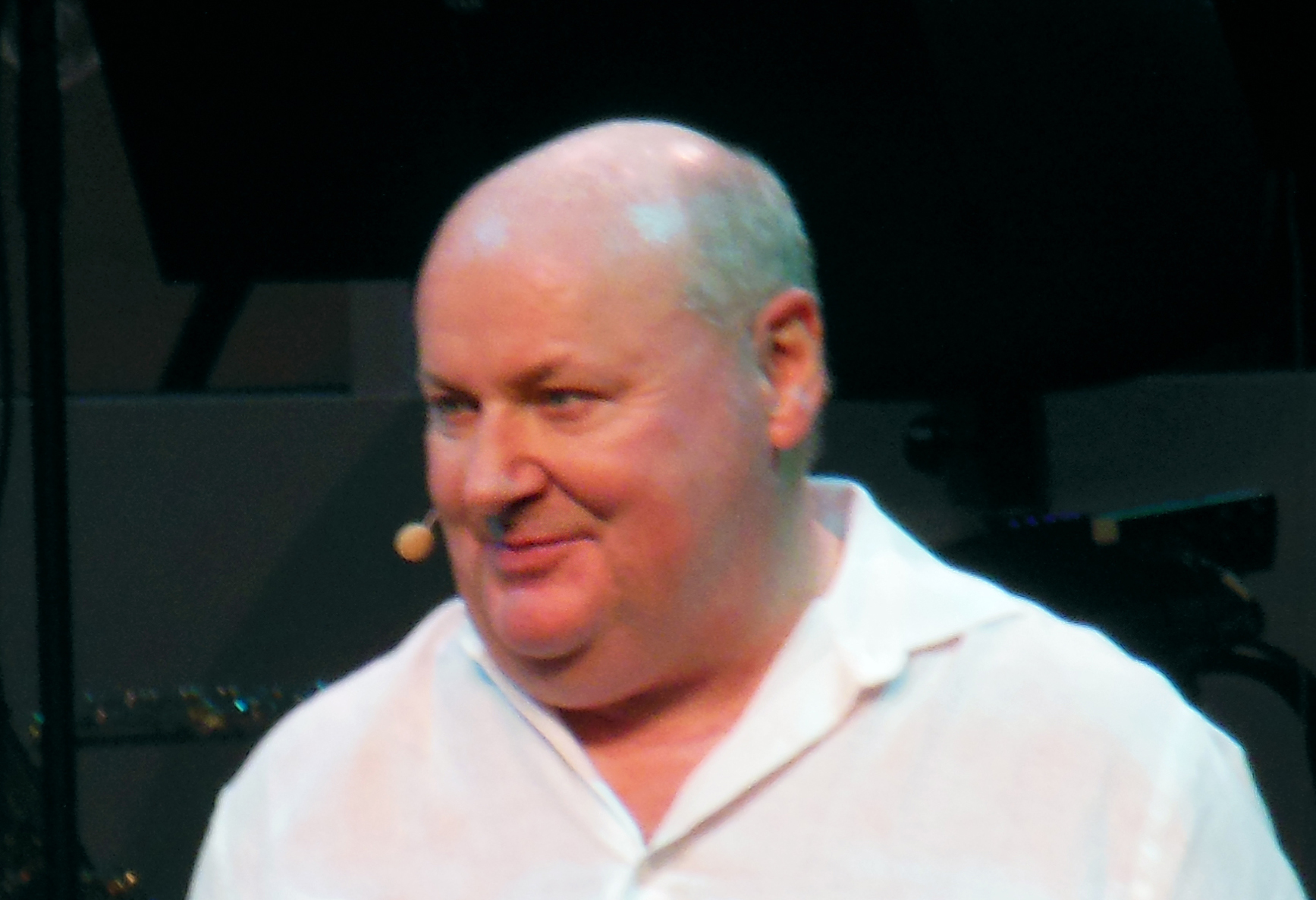
- Knut Agnred in September 2015
- Born: Knut Axel Lennart Agnred; 29 February 1956 (age 69); Gothenburg, Sweden
- Known for: Galenskaparna och After Shave

Signature
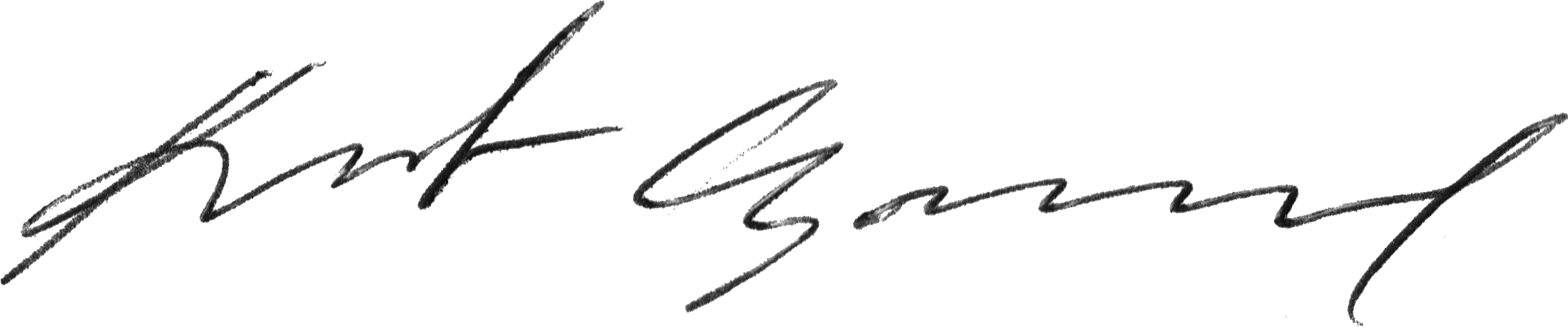

Knut Axel Lennart Agnred (born 29 February 1956) is a Swedish singer, actor, and comedian. He is known for being a member of Galenskaparna och After Shave.

== Life and career ==
Knut Agnred is the son of the athlete Lennart Andersson, who adopted the surname Agnred. He was educated in electrical engineering after studying at Chalmers University of Technology in Gothenburg. He has also worked in elderly care at Kålltorps sjukhem in Gothenburg. He has been a member of the comedy group After Shave since its inception in 1979. Agnred has written lyrics and music for several songs performed by Galenskaparna och After Shave.

Agnred has collaborated with Ken Wennerholm and Göran Rudbo in Triple & Touch and released a solo album called Text & music in 2004. In March 2009, the death metal band Despite released their debut album In Your Despite, which Knut Agnred contributed to on the opening track "Mindplague".

== Filmography ==
=== Film ===
Year	Title	Role	Notes
1986	The Castle Tour	Tourist with his son (Erik Wingquist)	
1987	Leif	Sven "Rambo" Larsson, Tommy Backman, Raggare, Soldat, Överläkare	
1989	Hajen som visste för mycket	Pastor Himmler	
1990	Macken – Roy's & Roger's Bilservice	Hans	
1991	Stinsen brinner... filmen alltså	Sören Skärberg, Emilio, Göte Kåla	
1996	Monopol	Egil Rosén	
1998	Åke från Åstol	Åke	
2006	Den enskilde medborgaren	Frank Malvin (director of ODEN)	

=== Television ===
Year	Title	Role	Notes
1986	Macken	Budda	
1989	En himla många program	Various roles	
1993	Tornado	Jag, Aster, Disponenten, Fleetwood Hjelm, Drängen Sluta, Uppland, Sumo, Sten Johnsson, Viktor Bremer, Uno Skalle	
2000	Gladpack	Various roles	

== Theatre ==
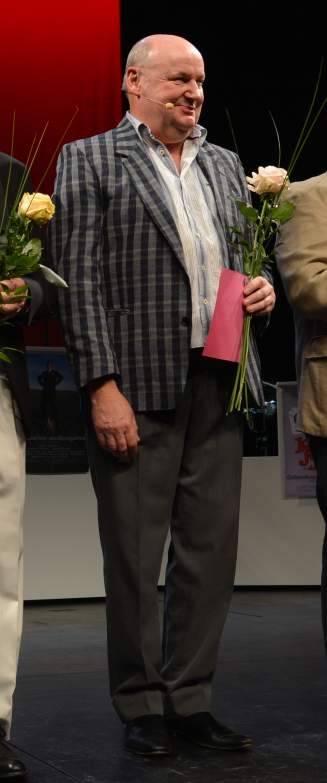
Knut Agnred at Lorensbergsteatern on 13 December 2014

- 1982 – Skruven är lös
- 1983 – Träsmak
- 1985 – Cyklar
- 1987 – Stinsen brinner
- 1991 – Grisen i säcken
- 1992 – Skruven är lös
- 1993 – Nått nytt?
- 1994 – Resan som blev av
- 1994 – Lyckad nedfrysning av herr Moro
- 1997 – Alla ska bada
- 2000 – Allt Möjligt
- 2000 – Jul Jul Jul
- 2001 – Den onde, den gode, den fule och Rippe
- 2002 – Kasinofeber
- 2004 – Falkes fondue
- 2007–2009 – Cabaret Cartwright
- 2009–2011 – En kväll med "After Shave och Anders Eriksson" (även "Best of After Shave och Anders Eriksson")
- 2010 – Gubbröra och Pyttipanna, med After Shave och Anders Eriksson
- 2010–2011 – Hagmans Konditori
- 2012–2014 – 30-årsfesten
- 2015–2016 – Spargrisarna kan rädda världen

== Discography ==
Solo

- 2004 – Text & musik (CD)
- 2004 – "Världen är full av dårar" (CD single)
