= Per Fritzell =

Swedish comedian and actor

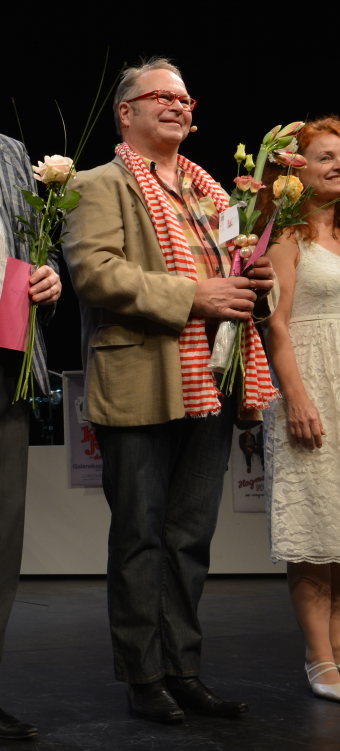
- Fritzell in 2014
- Born: 2 October 1955 (age 70); Stockholm, Sweden
- Occupations: Comedian; actor; singer
- Known for: Galenskaparna och After Shave

Signature
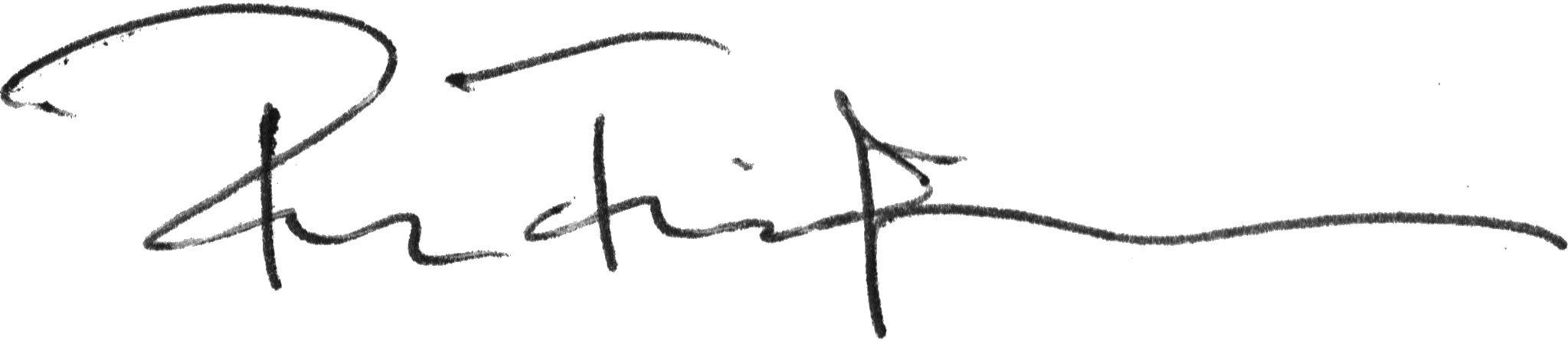

Per Fritzell (born 2 October 1955) is a Swedish comedian and actor and member of the Galenskaparna och After Shave comedic group.

== Biography ==
He was born in Stockholm but grew up in Gothenburg. He studied at Chalmers University of Technology, and he ended up dropping out of the electro-technic class. In May 2012, he released his first solo album Jag tror inte på Gud, jag tror på Tomten. He presented an episode of Sveriges Radios show Sommar i P1 on 22 July 2014 talking about his life and career. Fritzell also participated in SVT's production Allsång på Skansen in the summer of 2020, in a duet with Victor Leksell, they sang Man ska ha husvagn.

== Filmography ==
- Macken (1986) (TV series)
- The Castle Tour (1986)
- Leif (1987)
- En himla många program (1989) (TV series)
- Hajen som visste för mycket (1989)
- Macken – Roy's & Roger's Bilservice (1990)
- Stinsen brinner... filmen alltså (1991)
- Tornado (1993) (TV series)
- Rederiet (1994) (TV series)
- En på miljonen (1995)
- Monopol (1996)
- Åke från Åstol (1998)
- Mitt i livet (1999)
- Gladpack (2000)
- Lejonkungen 3 – Hakuna Matata (voice of Timon) (2004)
- Den enskilde medborgaren (2006)
- Hoppet (2007)
- Playa del sol (2009)
- Hälsningar från (2018) (TV series)
- One More Time (2023)
